= Schifferstadt–Wörth railway =

Railway line in Germany

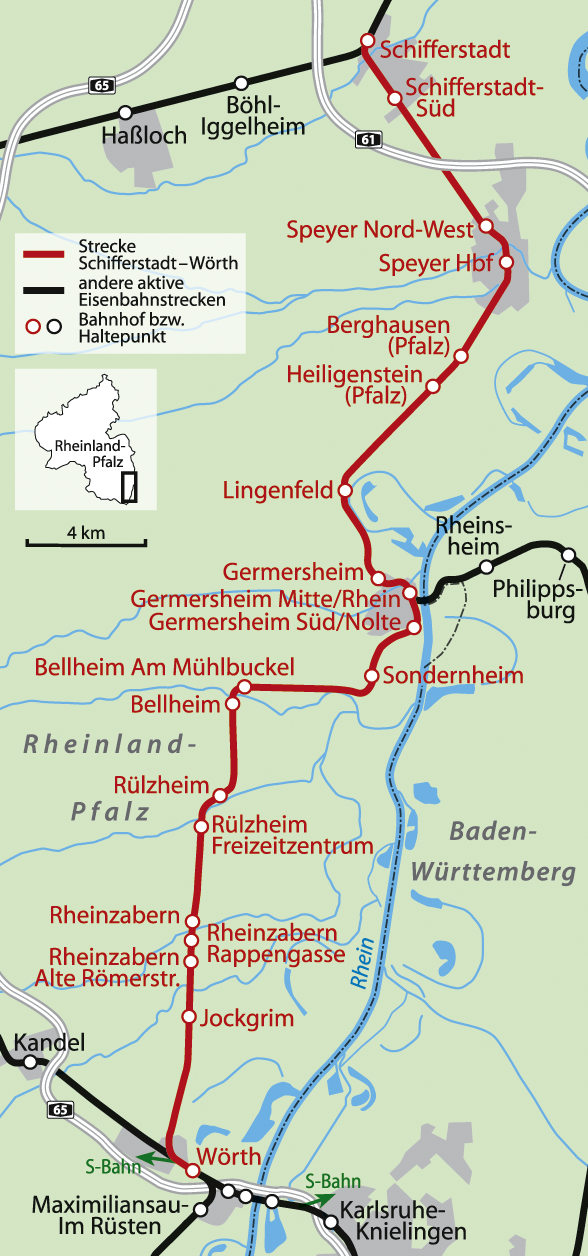

Overview
- Line number: 3400 (including Bienwald Railway)
- Locale: Rhineland-Palatinate, Germany

Service
- Route number: 677

Technical
- Num of tracks: 2 (throughout)
- Track gauge: 1,435 mm (4 ft 8 1/2 in) standard gauge
- Electrification: 15 kV/16.7 Hz AC overhead
- Operating speed: 140 km/h (87 mph) (maximum)
- Maximum incline: <1.0%

The Schifferstadt–Wörth railway or Speyer line is a uniformly double track and electrified main line in the German state of Rhineland-Palatinate. Between Schifferstadt and Germersheim it is part of the network of the Rhine-Neckar S-Bahn. Between Germersheim and Wörth am Rhein it is part of the network of the Stadtbahn Karlsruhe.

The first section between Schifferstadt and Speyer was opened on 11 June 1847 and it was extended to Germersheim in 1864. The opening of the last section to Wörth am Rhein was opened in 1876. From 1906 to 1914, it was served by long-distance services, which ended after the First World War and the subsequent reincorporation of Alsace-Lorraine into France. Electrification was begun in 2006 and completed in 2010.

== History ==
=== Beginnings and emergence of the Schifferstadt–Germersheim section ===
Originally the administration of the Circle of the Rhine (Rheinkreis), which was part of Bavaria, planned that its first railway line would be first in the north–south direction. Instead, the Palatine Ludwig Railway (Pfälzische Ludwigsbahn) was built between 1847 and 1849 from Rheinschanze (Ludwigshafen from 1853) to Bexbach; this mainly served the transport of coal. A route via Speyer, which was then the capital of the Circle of the Rhine (similar to the modern concept of the Palatinate), was considered instead of a route via Rheinschanz island, on which the city of Mannheim had built a fortification on the opposite bank of the Rhine. This alternative was dropped, since the main traffic flowed towards Mannheim at that time. In 1838, however, it was determined that Speyer should be linked to the main line via a branch line.

The Palatine Ludwig Railway Company (Pfälzische Ludwigsbahn-Gesellschaft) opened a branch line from Schifferstadt to Speyer with the commissioning of the Rheinschanze–Neustadt section of the Ludwig Railway on 11 June 1847.

Plans for a north–south connection were subsequently developed. There were two options for discussion: one would run from Neustadt via Landau to Wissembourg in Alsace and continue from there to Strasbourg. The other would have extended the branch to Speyer via Germersheim and Lauterbourg to Strasbourg. The first option prevailed, because France hesitated and because the former option passed through territory that was more densely settled than a route along the Rhine valley.

The section to Germersheim was opened on 14 March 1864 at a cost of a total of one million gulden, after being delayed by difficulties on agreeing on a route past its fortress.

=== Closing the gap to Wörth and further development ===
In the same year, a committee met in Rülzheim, which called for an extension of the line to Wörth. Apart from representatives from Rülzheim, it included representatives of Germersheim, Bellheim, Rheinzabern, Wörth and Maxau. It was at first unclear whether the town of Germersheim should be bypassed to the west or east. The former option would have been longer and more expensive. The Franco-Prussian War delayed the implementation of the project.

The municipality of Kandel, which since 1864 had been served by the line from Winden to Karlsruhe campaigned for a route that passed through its territory. The administration of the Palatinate Railway (Pfälzische Eisenbahnen), to which the Ludwig Railway Company had belonged since 1870, rejected this proposal on 20 November 1871 since such a route would have required a detour which would have reduced traffic on the line. Kandel, however, did not give up immediately, and had its plan rewritten. Nevertheless, the chosen route went through Wörth. This was approved on 15 March 1874. The construction of the line went forward without any major problems and it was opened on 25 July 1876, along with its continuation via Lauterbourg to Strasbourg. Unlike the Schifferstadt–Germersheim section, the newly opened section of the track was owned and operated by the Palatine Maximilian Railway (Pfälzische Maximiliansbahn-Gesellschaft). The line from Schifferstadt to Lauterbourg had two tracks from 1906. The express trains from Berlin to Strasbourg, which had previously run via Neustadt and the Neustadt–Wissembourg railway, now ran via Speyer and Germersheim as this route was shorter and the new track provided sufficient capacity.

The line, along with the other railways within the Palatinate, was absorbed into the Royal Bavarian State Railways (Königlich Bayerische Staatseisenbahnen) on 1 January 1909.

=== Development after the First World War ===
After the First World War, Alsace-Lorraine was returned to France and the long-distance services to it also ended, since the newly founded Deutsche Reichsbahn wanted trains to run as far as possible within Germany. Instead, the long-distance services ran over the Rhine Valley Railway. The Reichsbahn allocated the line to the newly created Reichsbahndirektion (railway division) of Ludwigshafen in 1922. In 1936 the route line was reallocated during the dissolution of the latter – with the exception of Wörth station – to the railway division of Mainz. Deutsche Bundesbahn (DB), which was responsible for railway operations from 1949, assigned the line to the railway division of Mainz, which was responsible for all railway lines within the newly created state of Rhineland-Palatinate. In the course of the staged dissolution of the railway division of Mainz from 1 August 1971, its counterpart in Karlsruhe took responsibility for the station. Up to 1980, an express train ran from Strasbourg to Ludwigshafen, which served the French military in particular.

The line to Germersheim was electrified and the stations and halts were modernised with the establishment of S-Bahn operations between Schifferstadt and Germersheim. Karlsruhe Stadtbahn services have operated between Germersheim and Wörth, continuing to/from Karlsruhe, since December 2010.

Between Germersheim and Wörth, the platforms of the stations that already existed before 2010 differ from the other Stadtbahn platforms in the area of the Karlsruher Verkehrsverbund (Karlsruhe transport association, KVV) in having a length of 160 m to allow the commuter trains to and from BASF to stop there. The usual platform length for a triple set is 120 m. Both tracks, including all points, were completely replaced over the whole Germersheim–Wörth section during the summer holidays of 2007. Because of finds of unexploded bombs from the Second World War in the track bed in the area of Jockgrim the construction work was extended by a week. The line was also completely closed during the Easter break of 2010. At this time the platforms were partly renewed and the electrification started. Furthermore, the line was blockaded because of the construction from 5 July 2010 until 12 December 2010.

== Route ==
The 50 km-long railway line begins in Schifferstadt, where it branches to the left from the Palatine Ludwig Railway. It runs directly to the southeast to the outskirts of Schifferstadt and continues through the woods between Schifferstadt and Speyer. A few hundred metres after a junction with part of the former Heidelberg–Speyer railway that is still used as an industrial railway, the line curves to the south.

While still in the city of Speyer it curves again to the southwest and runs almost straight, passing the community of Römerberg to the west of its built-up area. Shortly before Lingenfeld it curves left and runs south between the built-up areas of Lingenfeld and Lingenfelder Altrhein. On this section of the line used to converge with the Germersheim–Landau railway, which came from the right and ran parallel with the Speyer line as far as Germersheim.

In Germersheim the line takes an odd course: after its exit from the station it makes an S-shaped double curve and runs around the east of the town, instead of passing Germersheim to the west, which would have been possible at the time because the old town was far enough to the east. The Bruhrain Railway branches off the line at Germersheim station and runs parallel to the left of the Speyer line about halfway around the town before turning east to cross the Rhine. The Speyer line makes another S-curve and leaves Germersheim behind.

The line then runs to Sondernheim, where it curves to the west to Bellheim, where it turns back to the south and runs to Rülzheim. In northwestern Rülzheim, it makes a lazy S-curve and then continues south, cutting through Rheinzabern and Jockgrim to connect with the Palatine Maximilian Railway and the Bienwald Railway in Wörth am Rhein.

== Operating points ==
=== Schifferstadt ===
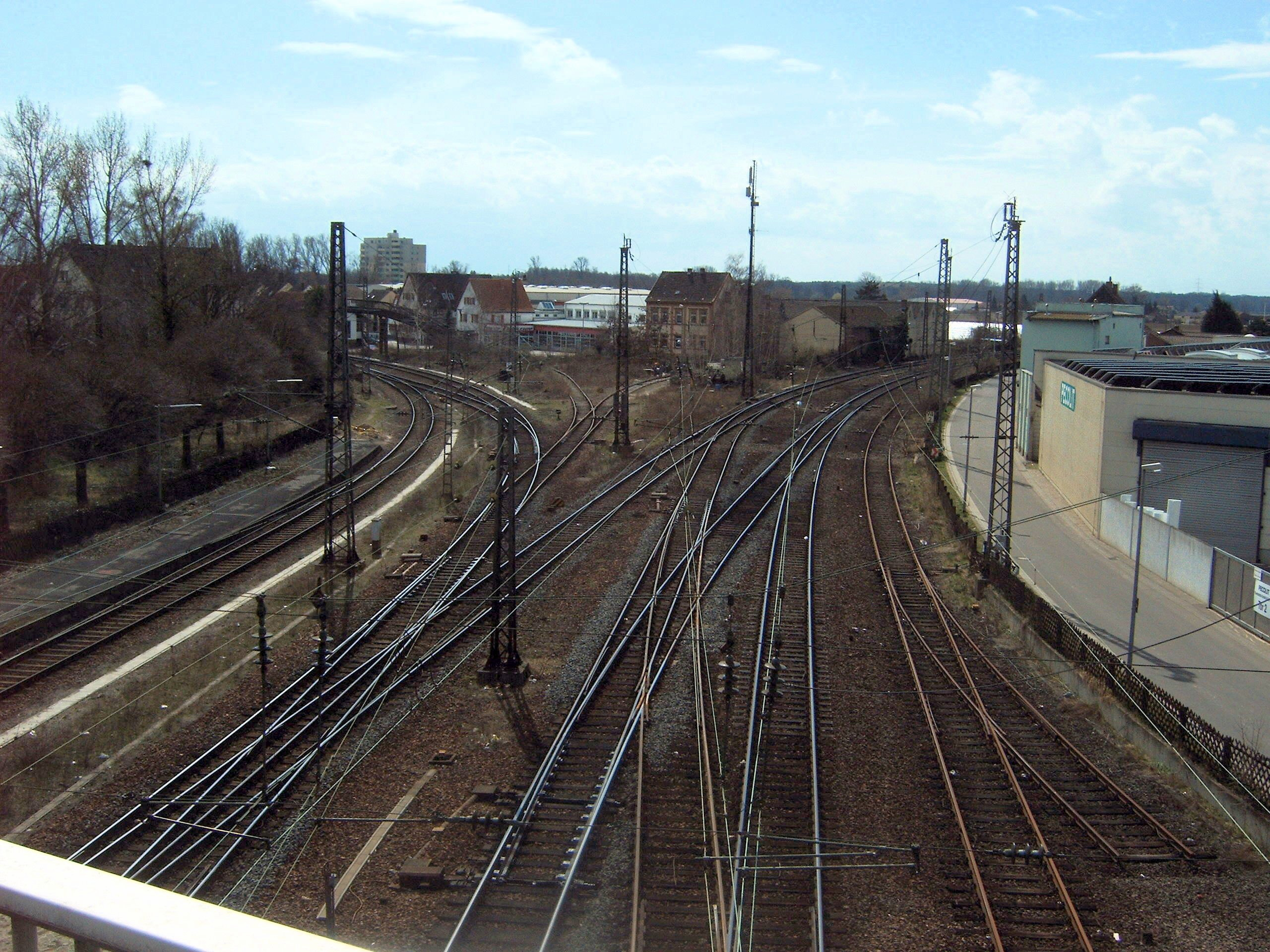
Schifferstadt station: the Speyer line (left) branches from the Mannheim–Saarbrücken railway (right).

Schifferstadt station is the starting point of the Schifferstadt–Wörth railway. It is located on the north-western outskirts of Schifferstadt. It was opened at the same time as the branch from the Rheinschanze–Neustadt section of the Ludwig Railway to Speyer, making Schifferstadt the first railway junction in the Palatinate.

=== Schifferstadt Süd ===
The halt of Schifferstadt Süd (south) is located on the southern outskirts of Schifferstadt, near the school centre. It was built after the Second World War.

=== Speyer Nord-West ===
The halt of Speyer Nord-West (northwest) connects the suburbs of Speyer-Nord and Speyer-West to the rail network.

=== Speyer Hauptbahnhof ===
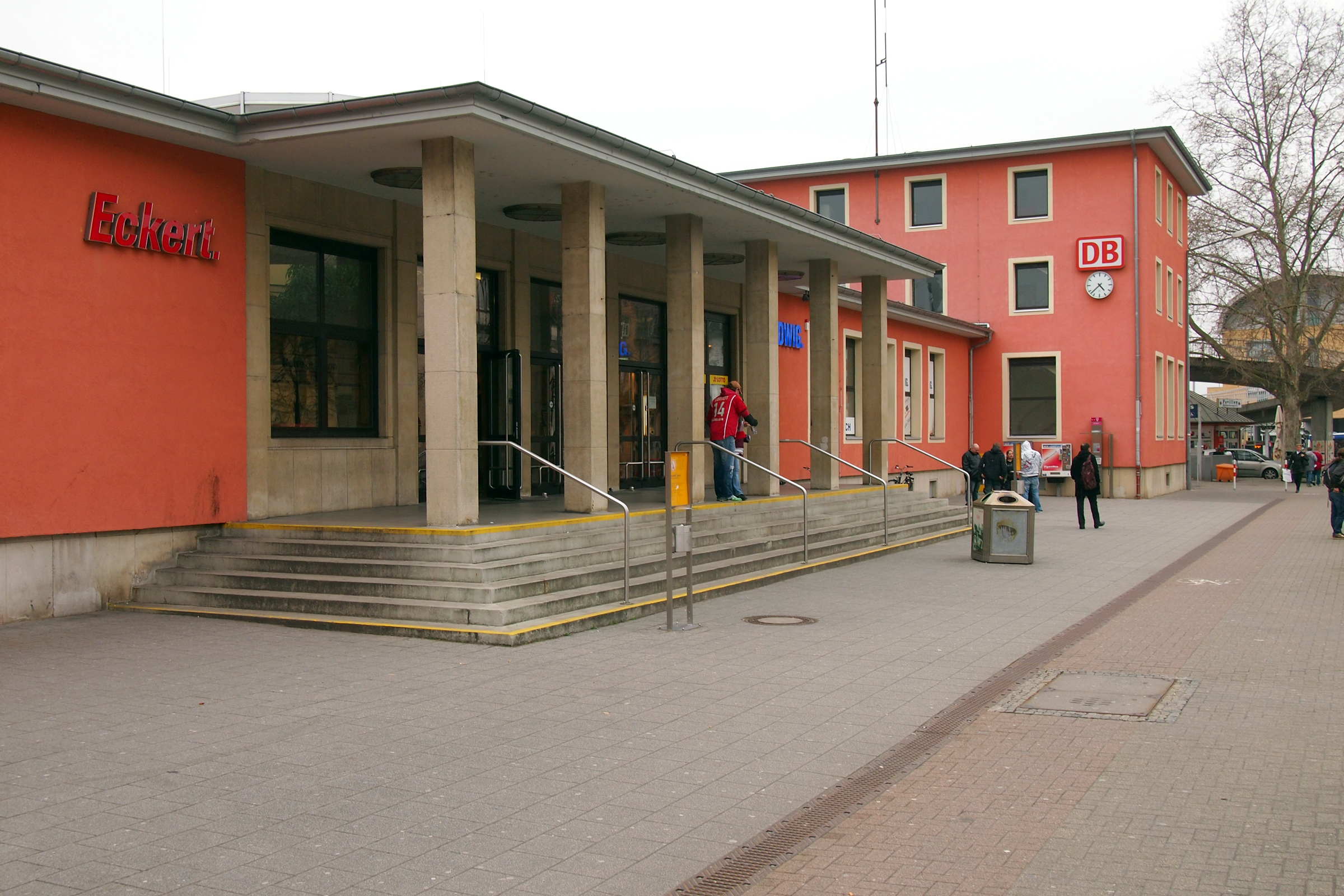
Speyer Hauptbahnhof

Speyerer Hauptbahnhof was the terminus of the branch line beginning in Schifferstadt from 1847 to 1864. Its entrance building was destroyed in the Second World War and a new one was built at the end of the 1950s. The former freight shed is still preserved and is located south of the station building. Although there are still freight operations, it is no longer used for railway operations and it is currently vacant.

=== Speyer Süd ===
The development programs for Rheinland-Pfalz-Taktes 2015 (the Rhineland-Palatinate integrated regular interval timetable for 2015) and for the second stage of construction of the Rhine-Neckar S-Bahn included the construction an additional halt in the south of the city of Speyer, called Speyer Süd. After ten years of delay, the city council of Speyer decided in August 2012 to build the halt at Dr.-von-Hörmann-Straße in the immediate vicinity of the Speyer-Südwest special area.

=== Berghausen (Pfalz) ===
The former station and current halt of Berghausen (Pfalz) is located on the western edge of Berghausen, a district of Römerberg. The former entrance building and the freight shed are no longer used for railway operations.

=== Heiligenstein (Pfalz) ===
The former station and the present halt of Heiligenstein (Pfalz) is located on the western edge of Heiligenstein, a district of Römerberg. The former entrance building and the freight shed are no longer used for railway operations.

=== Lingenfeld ===
The former Lingenfeld station has now been restored as a halt. For historical reasons – the village grew very quickly after the railway was opened – it is located at the extreme north-eastern edge of the village. Its former entrance building and the freight shed are no longer used for railway operations. The former Germersheim–Landau railway also ran through the centre of Lingenfeld but it never had a station in the village.

=== Germersheim ===
The railways formerly branched in both directions from Germersheim station, but the lines now only branch to the south. It is at the extreme northern end of the city and its track layout is partly in the municipality of Lingenfeld. The original entrance building, which is to the east of the railway tracks, is also under heritage protection. It was opened as a terminal station in 1864. With the commissioning of the Germersheim–Landau railway in 1872, trains had to reverse in the terminus to continue along the other line. This situation did not change until the Schifferstadt–Germersheim line was completed to Wörth to the south in 1876. A year later the Bruhrain Railway from Bruchsal to Rheinsheim was extended to Germersheim. Thus, it became an important junction station for long-distance traffic in the east–west direction and from 1906 also in the north–south direction. When Alsace-Lorraine returned to France after the First World War, it lost importance for north–south traffic. It has been part of the Rhine-Neckar S-Bahn since 2006 and integrated into the network of the Karlsruhe Stadtbahn since 2010. In this context, its platforms have been adapted for the disabled.

=== Germersheim Mitte/Rhein ===
The halt of Germersheim Mitte/Rhein (middle/Rhine) is located in the east of Germersheim and serves to give closer access to the city centre. It is also served by the Bruhrain Railway. It is served by services of the Rhine-Neckar S-Bahn. It was opened at the end of 2010 during the integration of the Germersheim–Wörth line in the network of the Karlsruhe Stadtbahn and is – since the Bruhrain Railway is slightly elevated on an embankment – like Ludwigshafen Hauptbahnhof in having diverging platforms on different levels.

=== Germersheim Süd/Nolte ===
The halt of Germersheim Süd/Nolte (south/Nolte) is in the southeast of Germersheim, which offers easy access to the main furniture factory of the Nolte Group in the south-east of Germersheim. It was opened at the end of 2010 during the integration of the Germersheim–Wörth line in the network of the Karlsruhe Stadtbahn.

=== Sondernheim ===
The halt of Sondernheim is centrally located in the Germersheim district of the same name. Its former entrance building is also a protected monument.

=== Bellheim Am Mühlbuckel ===
The halt of Bellheim Am Mühlbuckel is located in the northeast of Bellheim. It was opened at the end of 2010 during the integration of the Germersheim–Wörth line in the network of the Karlsruhe Stadtbahn.

=== Bellheim station ===
The former station and the current halt of Bellheim is located in the southeast of Bellheim. Its former entrance building is also a protected monument. Previously, it connecting line to a US oil terminal and one to the Büromöbelfabrik Kardex furniture factory. During its integration in the network of the Karlsruhe Stadtbahn, its island platform was replaced by a side platforms.

=== Rülzheim (station and halt) ===
The municipality of Rülzheim has a halt (Rülzheim Bahnhof) in the middle of an S-curve at the northern edge of the town. It is about 250 metres northeast of the former station. The entrance building of the former station is also a protected monument. It now serves as a restaurant. In addition, the former freight hall still exists.

=== Rülzheim Freizeitzentrum ===
The halt of Rülzheim Freizeitzentrum is located near the Moby Dick water park. It was opened at the end of 2010 during the integration of the Germersheim–Wörth line in the network of the Karlsruhe Stadtbahn.

=== Rheinzabern Bahnhof ===
The former station and the current halt of Rheinzabern is located in the north of Rheinzabern.

=== Rheinzabern Rappengasse ===
The halt of Rheinzabern Rappengasse is located in the centre of Rheinzabern. It was opened at the end of 2010 during the integration of the Germersheim–Wörth line in the network of the Karlsruhe Stadtbahn.

=== Rheinzabern Alte Römerstraße ===
The halt of Rheinzabern Alte Römerstraße is located in the south of Rheinzabern. It was opened at the end of 2010 during the integration of the Germersheim–Wörth line in the network of the Karlsruhe Stadtbahn.

=== Jockgrim ===
The former station and the current halt of Jockgrim is located in the centre of Jockgrim. Its former entrance building is also a protected monument.

=== Wörth (Rhein) Zügelstraße ===
The halt of Wörth (Rhein) Zügelstraße is located in the north of the built-up area of Wörth am Rhein not far from the separation of the Schifferstadt–Wörth railway line from the line to Winden. It was opened at the regular 2011/2012 timetable change on 10 December 2011 and thus only one year after the commencement of Stadtbahn operations between Wörth und Germersheim.

=== Wörth (Rhein) ===
Wörth (Rhein) station is located to the southeast of the centre of Wörth. Originally, it was called Wörth i/Pfalz (in Palatinate). It was built in 1864 as a through station on the Winden–Karlsruhe railway. With the opening of the Schifferstadt–Germersheim line to Wörth in 1876, and its immediate continuation, the line to Strasbourg at the same time, it became a railway junction. The entrance building is a protected monument.

== Operations ==
=== Passengers ===
Today the line is largely operated for passenger transport. In the 1950s, railcars of class 33.2 based in Landau were used.

In operation, the line is divided into the Schifferstadt–Germersheim and the Germersheim–Wörth sections: the Rhine-Neckar S-Bahn operates lines S3 (Karlsruhe Hbf–Wörth (Rhein)–Germersheim–Schifferstadt–Ludwigshafen–Mannheim–Heidelberg–Bruchsal–Karlsruhe Hbf) and S4 (Germersheim–Schifferstadt–Ludwigshafen–Mannheim–Heidelberg–Bruchsal), S3 runs a service approximately every thirty minutes and every hour during surgery hours (the S4 only runs in surgery hours, S3 runs hourly between Karlsruhe Hbf and Germersheim via Wörth). These are operated by class 425.2 electric multiple units. Light-rail sets of classes GT8-100C/2S and GT8-100D/2S-M operate at least hourly between Germersheim and Wörth as Stadtbahn lines S51 (Germersheim–Wörth (Rhein)–Karlsruhe Albtalbf–Karlsruhe Europaplatz/Post Galerie (Karlstr.)) and S52 (Germersheim–Wörth (Rhein)–Karlsruhe Entenfang–Karlsruhe Marktplatz (Kaiserstraße)).

Furthermore, Regional-Express line RE 4 runs every two hours over the Schifferstadt–Wörth railway from Mainz Hauptbahnhof or Frankfurt Hauptbahnhof to Karlsruhe Hauptbahnhof. This only serves the stations of Schifferstadt, Speyer Hbf and Germersheim. In Germersheim, the trains change to the Bruhrain Railway to continue to Graben-Neudorf. They were previously operated with electric multiple units of class 425, as are services on the Rhine-Neckar S-Bahn. Since March 2015, this service, which is now part of the new Süwex network, has been operated with class 429 (Stadler FLIRT) sets.

=== Freight operations ===
Freight operations are operated exclusively by private operators. The ports of Speyer, Germersheim and Wörth are served; furthermore, block trains are operated, mainly to the Mineralölraffinerie Oberrhein oil refinery in Karlsruhe and to BASF in Ludwigshafen. The remaining stations are no longer used for freight operations. There was formerly a connecting line to a US oil terminal in Bellheim.

The rolling stock formerly used in rail freight operations was based in the Ludwigshafen locomotive depot in particular.
