= Jockgrim station =

Railway station in Jockgrim, Germany

Jockgrim
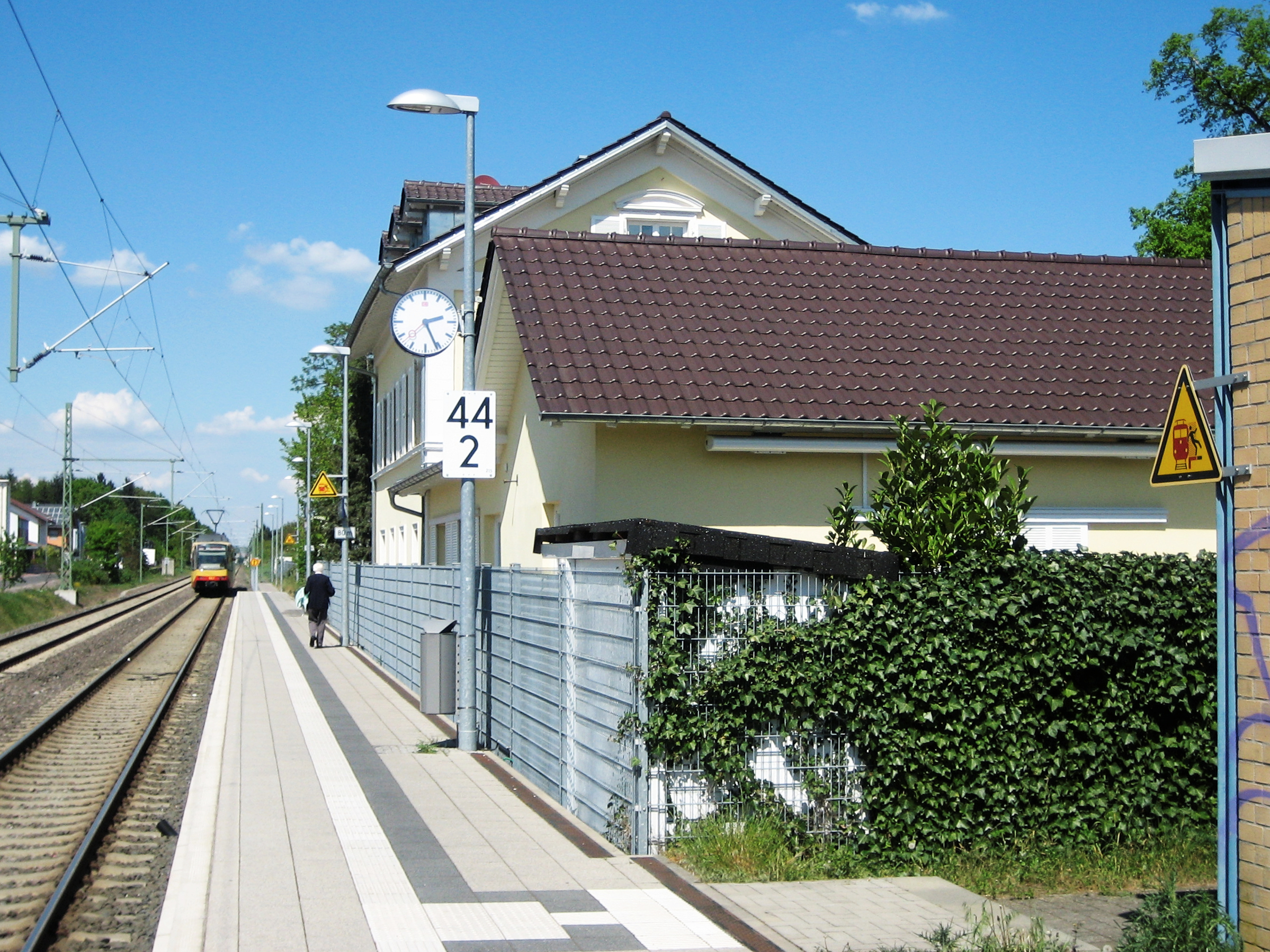
- Jockgrim station looking towards Germersheim, with former entrance building in the background

General information
- Location: Am Bahnhof 1, Jockgrim, Rhineland-Palatinate; Germany
- Coordinates: 49°05′33″N 8°16′20″E
- Line: Schifferstadt–Wörth (km 44.2)
- Platforms: 2

Construction
- Accessible: Yes
- Architectural style: Neoclassical

Other information
- Station code: 3057
- DS100 code: RJO
- IBNR: 8003125
- Category: 6
- Fare zone: KVV: 555; VRN: 213 (KVV transitional tariff)
- Website: www.bahnhof.de

History
- Opened: 25 June 1876

Services
Preceding station	Rhine-Neckar S-Bahn	Following station
Rheinzabern Alte Römerstraße towards Karlsruhe Hbf	S3	Wörth (Rhein) towards Karlsruhe Hbf
Rheinzabern Alte Römerstraße towards Ludwigshafen (Rhein) BASF Nord	S44 Limited service	Wörth (Rhein) One-way operation
Preceding station	Karlsruhe Stadtbahn	Following station
Rheinzabern Alte Römerstraße towards Germersheim	S 51	Wörth (Rhein) Zügelstraße towards Söllingen or Pforzheim Hbf
Rheinzabern Alte Römerstraße towards Germersheim	S 52	Wörth (Rhein) Zügelstraße towards Karlsruhe Marktplatz
Location

Jockgrim station is the only station in the town of Jockgrim in the German state of Rhineland-Palatinate. Deutsche Bahn classifies it as a category 6 station and it has two platform tracks. It is located on the network of the Karlsruher Verkehrsverbund (Karlsruhe Transport Association, KVV) and belongs to fare zone 555. Since 2001, the station has also been part of the area where the fares of the Verkehrsverbund Rhein-Neckar (Rhine-Neckar Transport Association, VRN) are accepted at a transitional rate. Its address is Am Bahnhof 1.

It is located on the Schifferstadt–Wörth railway and was opened on 25 July 1876 with the commissioning of the Germersheim–Wörth section of that railway. It is now classified as a Haltepunkt (halt). Since late 2010, it has been part of the Karlsruhe Stadtbahn. Its former entrance building is heritage-listed.

== Location ==
The station is located in the centre of Jockgrim.

== History ==
=== Railway initiatives around Jockgrim ===
Originally the administration of the Circle of the Rhine (Rheinkreis), which was part of Bavaria, planned that its first railway line would be first in the north–south direction from Rheinschanze via Lauterbourg to Strasbourg, which would compete with the Mannheim–Basel railway proposed by Baden. However, instead it was decided to build the Palatine Ludwig Railway (Pfälzische Ludwigsbahn, Ludwigshafen–Bexbach), which was opened in the period from 1847 to 1849. In the meantime, discussions took place as to whether a line from Neustadt via Landau to Wissembourg or a line along the Rhine via Speyer, Germersheim and Wörth was more urgent and desirable. Since the military preferred a route on the edge of the Palatinate Forest (Pfälzerwald), this was built in the form of the Maximilian Railway between Neustadt and Wissembourg.

The branch line to Speyer, which was opened in 1847, was extended to Germersheim in 1864. A local committee from Rülzheim supported an extension of the line now ending in Germersheim to Wörth, which soon resulted in a first draft route plan. The line to Wörth, including Jockgrim station, was opened on 25 July 1876.

=== Further development ===
The station became part of the area of the Reichsbahndirektion (Reichsbahn railway division) of Ludwigshafen after the founding of the Deutsche Reichsbahn in 1922. During the dissolution of the railway division of Ludwigshafen, responsibility for it was transferred to the railway division of Mainz on 1 May 1937.

Deutsche Bundesbahn (DB), which was responsible for railway operations from 1949, assigned the station to the railway division of Mainz, which was responsible for all railway lines within the newly created state of Rhineland-Palatinate. In the course of the staged dissolution of the railway division of Mainz from 1 August 1971, its counterpart in Karlsruhe took responsibility for the station. The station had been downgraded to a halt in the 1990s. The station became part of the Karlsruhe Stadtbahn in December 2010.

== Entrance building ==
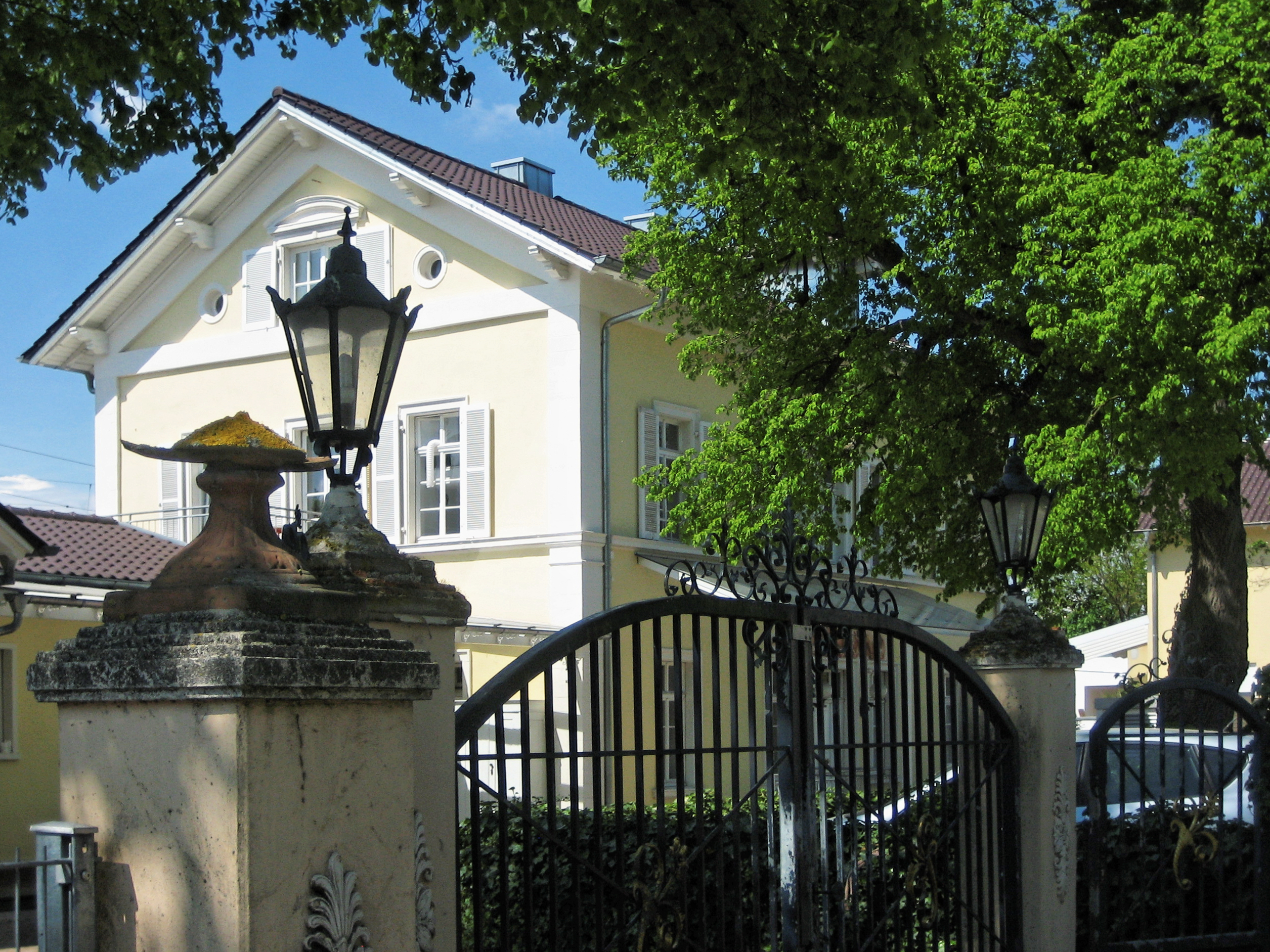
Former entrance building

The former entrance building, which was built between 1860 and 1870, is built in the Neoclassical style and is now heritage listed. It is no longer used for railway operations. It was restored in the 2000s and now houses a law office as well as a psychotherapy practice.

== Operations ==
=== Passenger services ===
The halt is served at 30-minute intervals. Lines S 51 and S 52 of Karlsruhe Stadtbahn run once an hour, beginning in Germersheim station and running to the Karlsruhe inner city. The former follows the Winden–Karlsruhe railway until shortly before Karlsruhe Hauptbahnhof, where it runs over the ramp to the Albtalbahnhof to connect with the tram network. The S 52 leaves the Winden–Karlsruhe railway east of Maxau, then runs over tram lines through the Karlsruhe district of Knielingen and from there to the inner city.

=== Freight operations ===
An important customer in freight transport were the local Ludowici brickworks, which were established in Jockgrim because of the construction of the railway. It was one of the largest manufacturers of bricks in the world in 1900. Freight traffic has now been abandoned.
