= Wörth (Rhein) station =

Railway station in Germany

Wörth (Rhein)
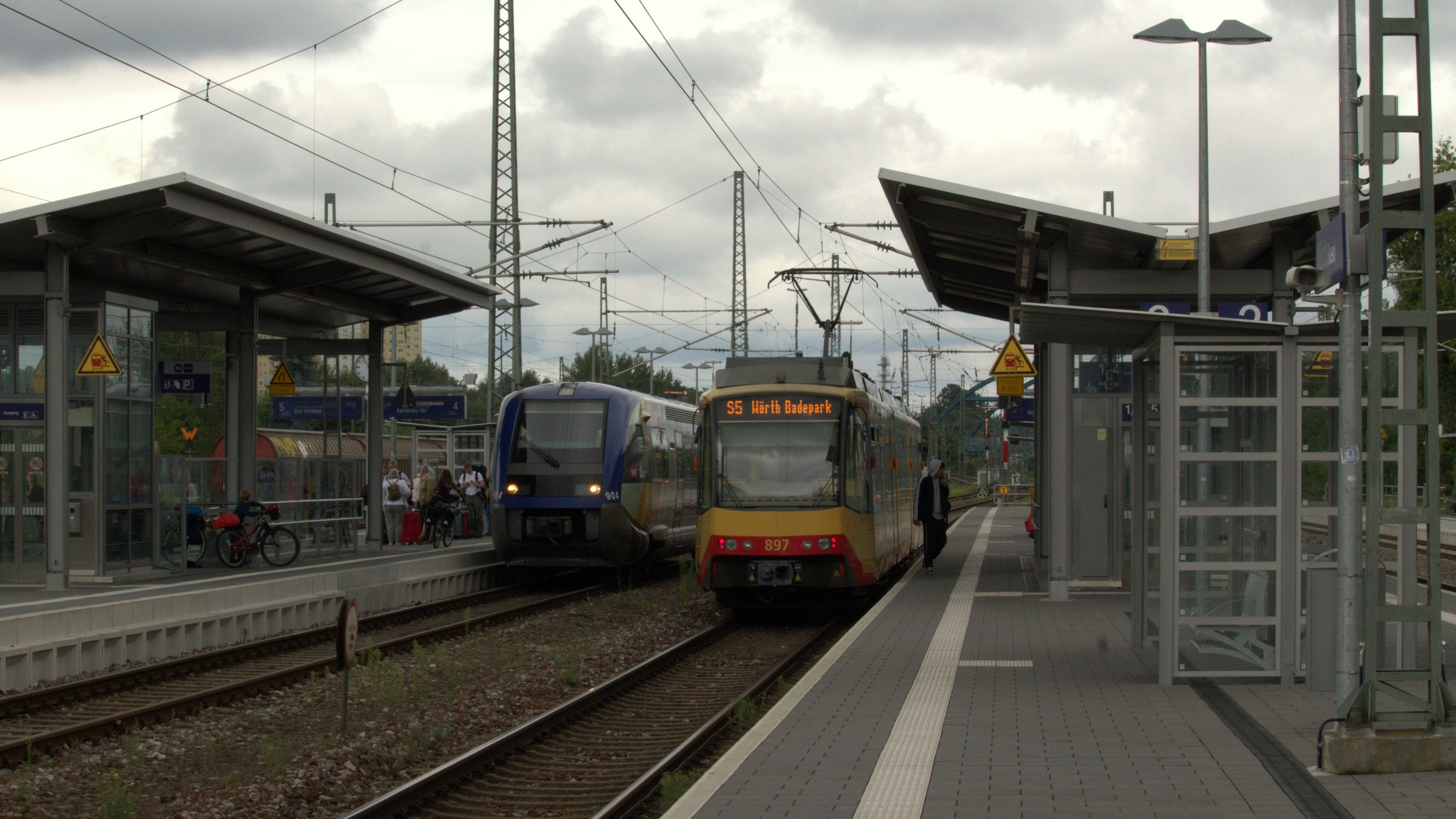
- 2017

General information
- Location: Bahnhofstr. 44, Wörth am Rhein, Rhineland-Palatinate; Germany
- Coordinates: 49°02′44″N 8°16′24″E
- Owner: DB Netz
- Operator: DB Station&Service
- Lines: Schifferstadt–Wörth (km 49.9); Winden–Karlsruhe (km 13.8); Wörth–Strasbourg (km 49.9); Wörth inner city (km 0.0); Stadtbahn Wörth (Rhein) (KBS 710.5)
- Platforms: 5

Construction
- Accessible: Yes
- Architectural style: Neoclassical and Renaissance Revival

Other information
- Station code: 6893
- DS100 code: RWRT
- IBNR: 8000254
- Category: 4
- Fare zone: KVV: 540; VRN: 233 (KVV transitional tariff)
- Website: www.bahnhof.de

History
- Opened: 14 March 1864

Services
Preceding station	DB Regio Mitte	Following station
Kandel towards Kaiserslautern Hbf	RE 6	Karlsruhe Hbf Terminus
Kandel towards Pirmasens Hbf	RE 55 Limited service	Maximiliansau West towards Karlsruhe Hbf
Wörth (Rhein) Mozartstraße towards Neustadt (Weinstraße) Hbf	RB 51	Maximiliansau West towards Karlsruhe Hbf
Terminus	RB 52	Maximiliansau-Im Rüsten towards Lauterbourg
Wörth (Rhein) Mozartstraße towards Lauterbourg	RB 54 Limited service	Karlsruhe Hbf Terminus
Kandel towards Bundenthal-Rumbach	RB 56 Limited service	Karlsruhe Hbf Terminus
Preceding station	Rhine-Neckar S-Bahn	Following station
Jockgrim towards Karlsruhe Hbf	S3	Karlsruhe Hbf Terminus
Preceding station	Karlsruhe Stadtbahn	Following station
Wörth Alte Bahnmeisterei towards Wörth Badepark	S 5	Maximiliansau West towards Pforzheim Hbf
Wörth (Rhein) Zügelstraße towards Germersheim	S 51	Maximilansau West towards Söllingen or Pforzheim Hbf
Jockgrim towards Germersheim	S 52	Maximilansau West towards Karsruhe Marktplatz
Location
- Location within Rhineland-Palatinate Location within Germany Location within Europe

Wörth (Rhein) station—originally Wörth (Pfalz)—is the most important station of the town of Wörth am Rhein in the German state of Rhineland-Palatinate. Deutsche Bahn classifies it as a category 5 station and it has five platforms. The station is located in the area of the Karlsruher Verkehrsverbund (Karlsruhe transport association, KVV) and it belongs to fare zone 540. Since 2001, Verkehrsverbund Rhein-Neckar (VRN) tickets are also accepted for travel to or from the VRN area. The address of the station is Bahnhofstraße 44.

It was opened on 15 March 1864 as a through station on the branch of the Maximilian Railway from Winden to Maximiliansau. The gap to Karlsruhe was closed a year later. The extension of the Schifferstadt–Gemersheim railway and its continuation to Strasbourg turned it into a junction station on 15 May 1876. A branch of the Karlsruhe Stadtbahn was built through the residential area of Dorschberg in 1997. Its entrance building is under heritage protection.

== Location ==
Wörth (Rhein) station Is located to the east of the centre of the town on Hanns-Martin-Schleyer-Straße (L 540), the main road thorough Wörth. In the immediate vicinity is a connection to federal highway 9. Attached to it is a large parking station, which is free to use.

== History ==
=== Development ===
The east-west aligned Palatine Ludwig Railway (Pfälzische Ludwigsbahn) was built from Rheinschanze (since 1853: Ludwigshafen) to Bexbach between 1847 and 1849. This mainly served the transport of coal. The Palatine Maximilian Railway (Pfälzische Maximiliansbahn, Neustadt-Wissembourg) was built in 1855 as a through line over which coal from the Saargegend and agricultural produce from the Palatinate could be transported to France.

In the following years, the Palatine Maximilian Railway Company (Pfälzische Maximiliansbahn-Gesellschaft) planned more lines, including a branch from the Maximilian Railway in Winden to Karlsruhe, the then capital of Baden. The reason for this was the hope for better coal traffic to the southern German countries of Baden, Württemberg and the rest of the Bavaria—which was geographically separated from the Circle of the Rhine (Rheinpfalz). The Bavarian military commander, Karl Krazeisen, who was at that time a troop commander in the Palatinate, emphasised that such a route was also necessary for strategic reasons.

In 1859, it received a concession from the Ministry of State for Trade and Public Works. However, resistance came from the town of Germersheim, which urged them to build a railway line first through its territory and from there to Bruchsal. In addition, in 1860, several representatives of South Palatinate communities gathered together and petitioned against a route via Winden and Kandel instead argued for a line from Landau via Offenbach, Herxheim, Leimersheim and Leopoldshafen to Karlsruhe.

=== Development to the railway junction (1864–1876) ===
Wörth station was opened on 14 March 1864 together with the Winden–Maximiliansau section of the Maximilian Railway. One year later, on 8 May 1865, the gap between Maximiliansau and the Maxau Railway (Maxaubahn) leading from Karlsruhe to Maxau was closed with the completion of the bridge over the Rhine. Thus, continuous operations were possible from Neustadt to Karlsruhe via Winden and Wörth.

Even before the construction of the Palatine Ludwig Railway from Ludwigshafen to Bexbach, there had been efforts to build a line from north to south in the Palatinate. A branch from the Ludwig Railway to Speyer was built in 1847, the same year as the Ludwigshafen–Neustadt section was opened. In 1864, it was extended to Germersheim. In the same year, a committee met in Rülzheim and advocated an extension of the line to Wörth. The representatives belonged, apart from Rülzheim, to Germersheim, Bellheim, Rheinzabern, Wörth and Maxau. Nevertheless, the Franco-Prussian War delayed the realisation of the project.

Nevertheless, it was not clear whether the planned line would go beyond Wörth. Thus the neighbouring community of Kandel demanded that the line be built through its territory. The Directorate of the Palatinate Railway (Pfälzische Eisenbahnen) refused this request on 20 November 1871, since such a route would have required a detour which would have reduced the competitiveness of the railway. Kandel, however, did not give up immediately and made a written proposal. Nevertheless, a route through Wörth was adopted. This was approved on 15 March 1874.

Both the extension of the railway line from Schifferstadt to Germersheim to Wörth station and its extension to Strasbourg were opened on 25 July 1876. Thus, the station became a railway junction within the Palatinate and experienced major reconstruction for the first time.

=== Further development (1876–1945) ===
A second track was installed between Winden and Maximiliansau. A second track was also installed on the lines to Schifferstadt and Strasbourg from 1906. From this time onwards, until the outbreak of the First World War, all of the express trains coming from Ludwigshafen used this route; these previously had to detour via the Palatine Maximilian Railway.

After the war, Alsace-Lorraine, which had belonged to the German Empire since 1871, was given back to France and long-distance traffic on the Wörth–Strasbourg railway was permanently transferred to lines through neighbouring Baden.

The station was integrated into the newly founded Reichsbahndirektion Ludwigshafen (railway division of Ludwigshafen) in 1922. During its dissolution on 1 May 1936, the station was transferred to the jurisdiction of the railway division of Karlsruhe.

In 1938, the line to Karlsruhe between Wörth and Maxau was realigned during the building of the fixed Rhine Bridge. In addition, Wörth station received an additional, third platform and a connecting subway at the same time.

=== Developments after the Second World War (1945–1993) ===
Operations between Wörth and Neustadt was again possible by the end of April 1945. As a result of the bombing of the Rhine Bridge, operations to the east could only recommence two years later. After the Second World War, the section between Winden and Wörth was reconstructed as one track during the French occupation to provide reparations.

Deutsche Bundesbahn transferred the station after the Second World War to the Bundesbahndirektion Mainz (railway division of Mainz), along with all railway lines within the newly created state of Rhineland-Palatinate. In 1971, the station returned to the jurisdiction of its Karlsruhe counterpart during the dissolution of the railway division of Mainz. The electrification of the line from Karlsruhe to Wörth followed in 1974, in order to avoid the need for freight trains from the east having to change of locomotives in Karlsruhe.

The part of the line to Strasbourg remaining in Germany became even less significant after the Second World War. Already on 11 July 1980, the last express train ran between Ludwigshafen and Strasbourg. After that, passenger services from Wörth ended in Berg, the last station within Germany. On 1 June 1984, passenger services on the German side were abandoned.

=== Deutsche Bahn and integration into the Karlsruhe Stadtbahn (since 1994) ===
Between 1994 and the opening of the Stadtbahn between Wörth and central Karlsruhe in 1997, Deutsche Bahn operated an introductory service at hourly intervals between Karlsruhe Hauptbahnhof and Wörth station. The Stadtbahn line was numbered as the S8. On 26 September 1997, the S5 ran past the former terminus of the tramline in central Knielingen over a connecting line including a system change and onto the Winden–Karlsruhe railway. Starting from Wörth station, a new line was opened for the Stadtbahn through the residential area of Dorschberg, which had been built in the post-war period. At the same time a new station was built in the western part of the station area at Wörth Ludwigstraße (called Wörth Alte Bahnmeisterei from 1998), which is only served by the Stadtbahn. In the context of the opening of the Stadtbahn station, a three-storey parking station with 250 parking spaces was built to the east of the station building at the initiative of the Albtal-Verkehrs-Gesellschaft, the operator of the Stadtbahn line.

In 2002, passenger services were reactivated between Wörth and Lauterbourg; for marketing reasons, this section has been designated as the Bienwaldbahn (Bienwald Railway). Since 1999, cross-country trips without stop have operated on Sundays between Wörth and Lauterbourg.

At the timetable change of 2010/2011, the southern section of the Schifferstadt–Wörth railway (Germersheim – Bellheim – Rheinzabern – Wörth) was included in the network of the Karlsruhe Stadtbahn. Since then the newly created lines S51 and S52 have been running directly between the Karlsruhe inner city, Wörth and Germersheim.

Since 28 October 2013, Wörth station has been completely modernised during upgrading to provide accessibility. This work was divided into three construction phase. The completion of the overall project was planned for October 2014.

== Infrastructure ==
In addition to the parking station, which can be used free of charge, Wörth (Rhine) has some bicycle parking spaces. The Bahnhof-Treff pub is located in the station building. There are several bus stops on the station forecourt that are served by regional bus routes 549 and 593.

== Tracks ==
The numbering of the tracks begins on the north west side of the station building.

- Platform 1 has a through track and is located next to the entrance building as a "house" platform. It is used by the trains of the Bienwaldbahn (RB 52) to/from Lauterbourg.
- Platform 2 has a through track and shares an island platform with platform 3. It is used by Stadtbahn lines S51 and S52 towards Germersheim and towards Karlsruhe.
- Platform 3 is located on the island platform with platform 2. It is used by Stadtbahn line S5 towards Wörth Badepark and Regional-Express (RE 6) and Regionalbahn (RB 51) services towards Winden, Landau and Neustadt (Weinstraße).
- Platform 4 shares the southwestern island platform with platform 5. It is used by Regional services as well as individual Stadtbahn services on line S51 towards Karlsruhe Hbf.
- Platform 5 is also a through track and the last railway platform. It is used by Stadtbahn line S5 services towards Karlsruhe, Pforzheim, Mühlacker and Bietigheim-Bissingen. Individual services of the Bienwaldbahn to/from Lauterbourg also start or end here.
- Tracks 6 to 14 are not used for passenger services. They are usually used as sidings for freight trains.

== Entrance building ==
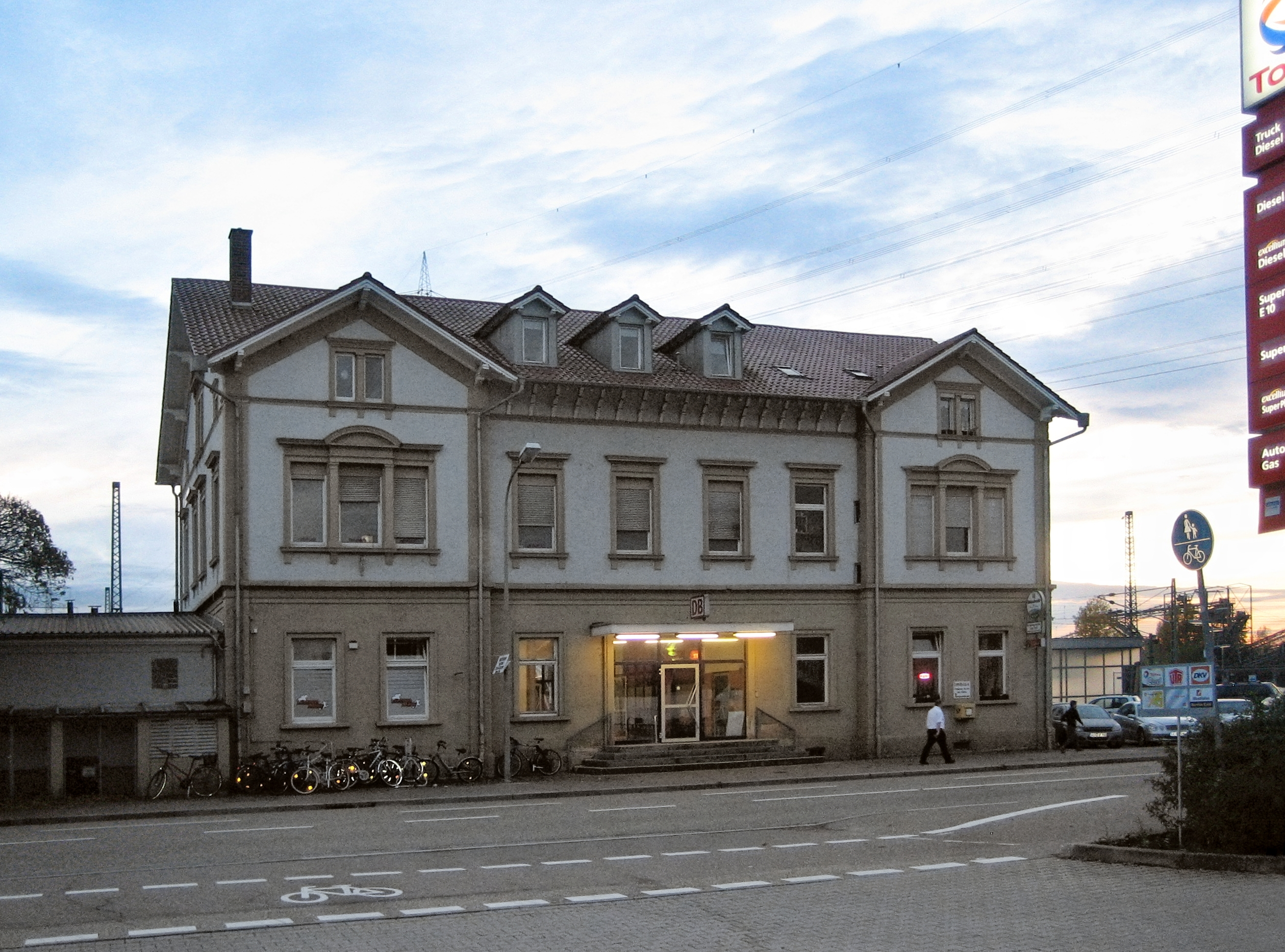
Entrance building of Wörth station

The entrance building is located on the north-western side of the station. It was built in the Neoclassical and Renaissance Revival styles in around 1870. On its side facing the street, it also has Avant-corps. The building is under monument protection.

== Signal boxes in the Wörth station area ==
There are two Mechanical signal boxes in Wörth station.

== Operations ==
=== Passengers ===
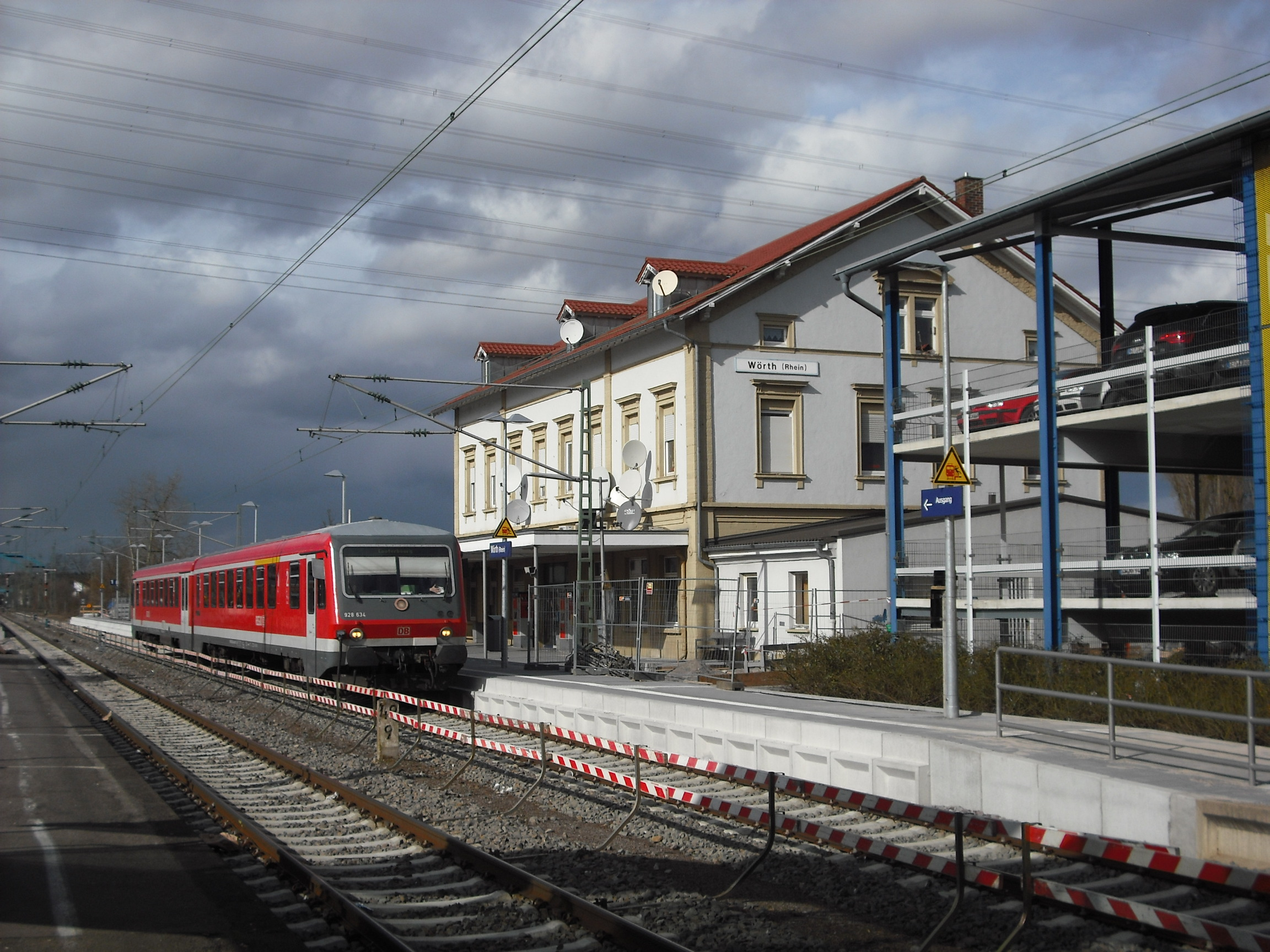
View of platform 1, with part of the parking station at the front right

In local rail transport, there are direct connections with one Regional-Express and three Regionalbahn services to Karlsruhe, Winden (Pfalz), Landau (Pfalz), Neustadt (Weinstraße), Kaiserslautern, Germersheim, Speyer, Schifferstadt, Ludwigshafen am Rhein and Lauterbourg in Alsace.

With Stadtbahn line S5, there is a direct connection from the Wörth residential area of Dorschberg via Wörth station to the inner city of Karlsruhe, continuing via Pforzheim and Mühlacker to Bietigheim-Bissingen. It runs between Badepark and Wörth station over a tram line. Between Wörth station and Maxau, it runs as a railway, between Knielingen and Durlach it again runs over tram tracks, then on to Bietigheim-Bissingen again over railway tracks. A further direct connection to Karlsruhe's inner city consists of Stadtbahn lines S51 and S52, which run through Wörth station between Germersheim and the Karlsruhe city centre.

Wörth (Rhein) station is located on the network of the Karlsruher Verkehrsverbund (Karlsruhe transport association, KVV). As the result of a transitional fare agreement in 1996 between the Karlsruher Verkehrsverbund (KVV) and the Verkehrsverbund Rhein-Neckar (Rhine-Neckar transport association, VRN), VRN tickets are also accepted.

In long-distance transport, the station was served from Monday to Friday by a pair of Intercity services on the Karlsruhe–Frankfurt route in the 2013/2014 timetable.

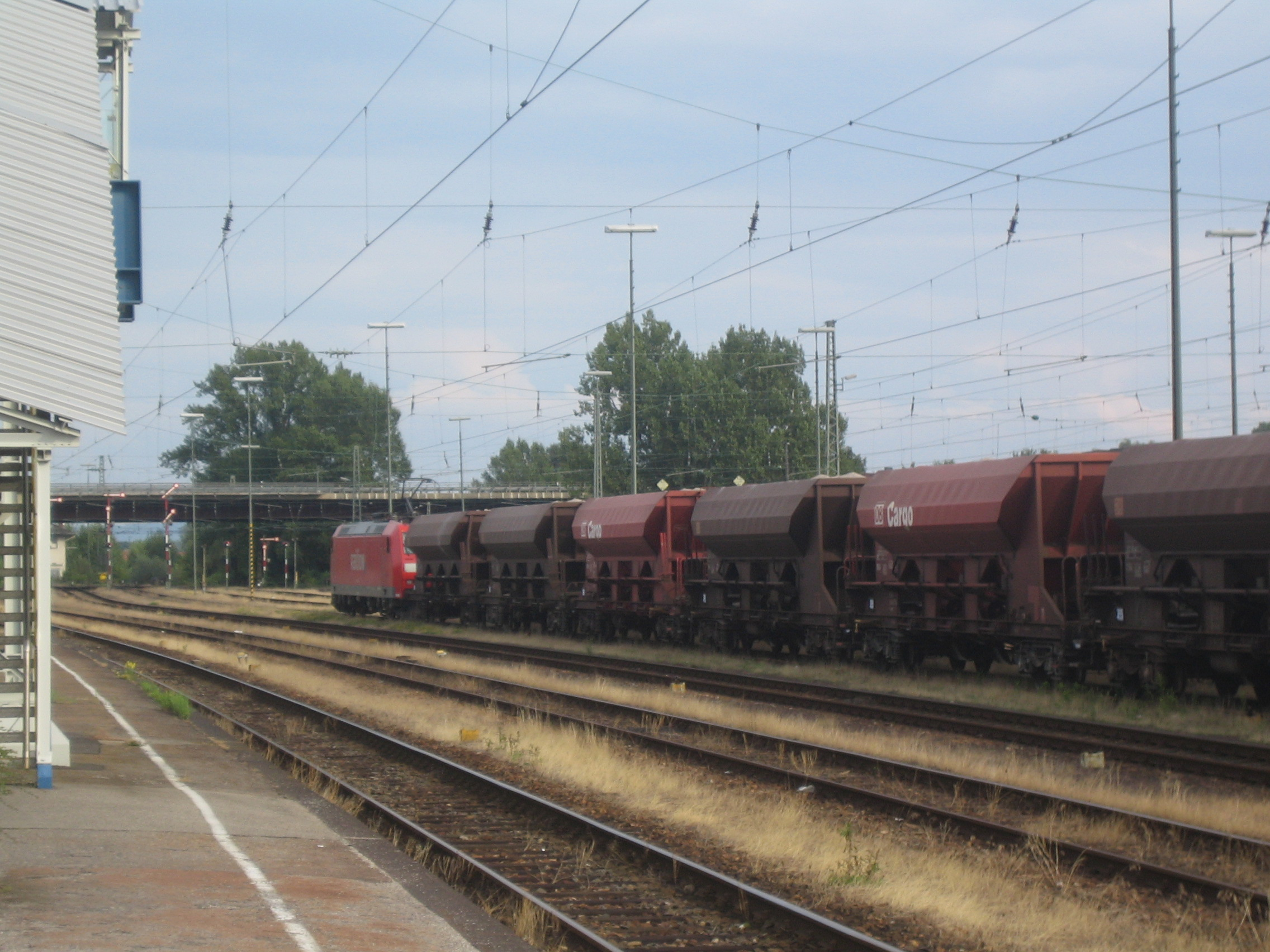
Goods train in Wörth station

=== Freight ===
Wörth station has a total of nine tracks without platforms, which serve freight traffic. Just a few years after its inauguration, it was home to numerous factory sidings, which served local industry and trade. In addition, due to its proximity to the French border, it developed into an important customs and transhipment centre. It is now mainly used for transporting cranes from the surrounding recreational lakes in former quarries (baggerseen) as well as for loading new trucks. A siding runs to Wörth harbour, where various logistics companies are active.

== Planning ==
The Albtal-Verkehrs-Gesellschaft (AVG) has long been called for connections to the towns of Landau and Bad Bergzabern on the Karlsruhe Stadtbahn network. This, however, requires the electrification of the corresponding lines as well as the doubling of the Winden–Wörth section of the Winden–Karlsruhe railway section, which has also been planned for some time. The state government of Rhineland-Palatinate intends to support this project and to take the necessary measures included in the Federal Transport Plan (Bundesverkehrswegeplan) of 2015. However, these plans are to be considered no earlier than 2025.

== Sources ==
=== Bibliography ===
- Franz Neumer (1999). Vor 150 Jahren fuhr die erste Eisenbahn durch Hochspeyer (in German). Heimatjahrbuch des Landkreises Kaiserslautern 1999. pp. 116–118.
