= Winden (Pfalz) station =

Railway station in Winden, Germany

Winden (Pfalz)
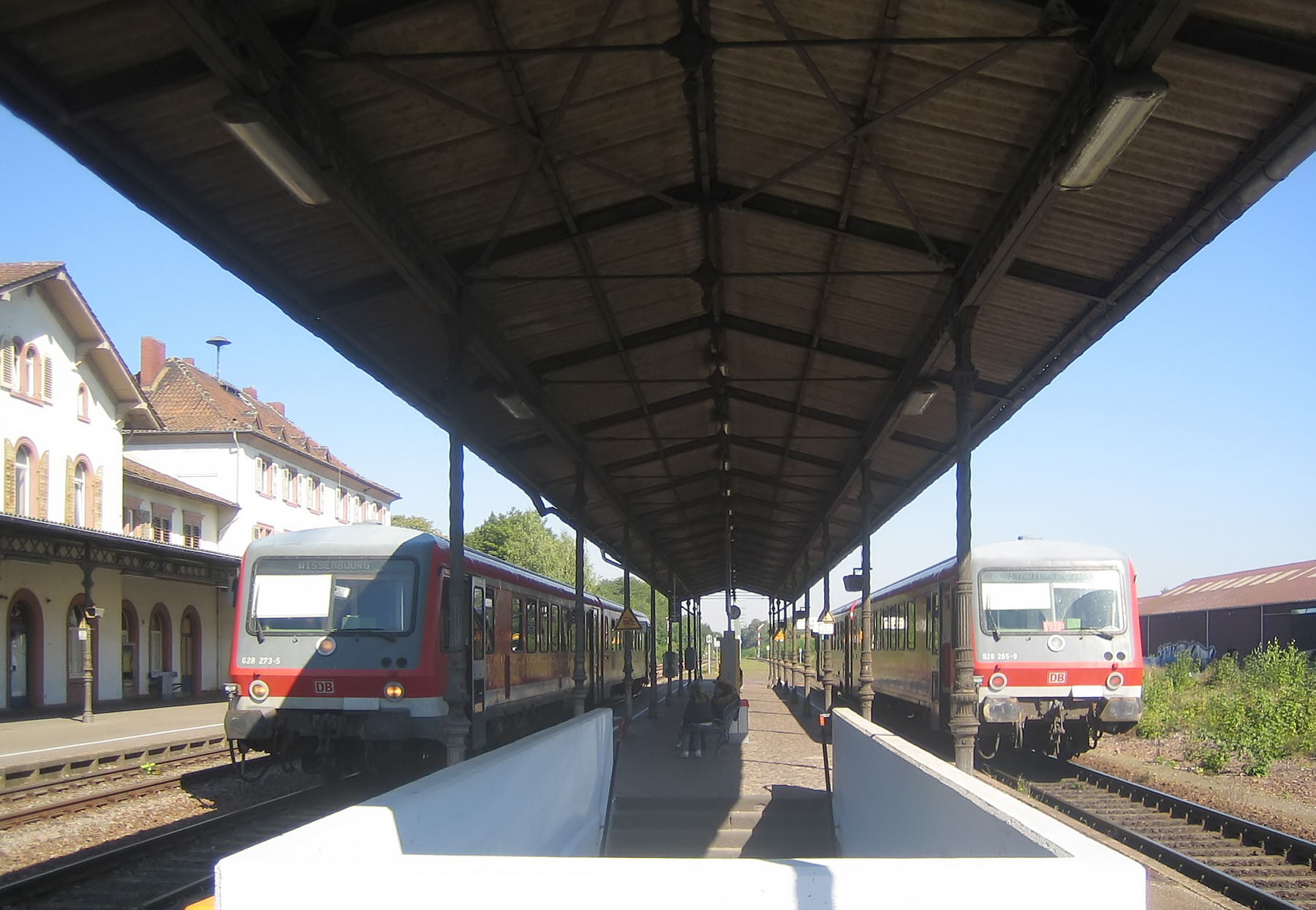

General information
- Location: Bahnhofstr. 17, Winden, Rhineland-Palatinate; Germany
- Coordinates: 49°5′44″N 8°7′21″E
- Lines: Neustadt–Wissembourg (KBS 676/679); Winden–Karlsruhe (KBS 676); Winden–Bad Bergzabern (KBS 678)
- Platforms: 3

Construction
- Accessible: Yes

Other information
- Station code: 6793
- DS100 code: RWND
- IBNR: 8006468
- Category: 4
- Fare zone: KVV: 550; VRN: 222 (KVV transitional tariff)
- Website: www.bahnhof.de

History
- Opened: 1855

Services
Preceding station	DB Regio Mitte	Following station
Landau (Pfalz) Hbf towards Kaiserslautern Hbf	RE 6	Kandel towards Karlsruhe Hbf
Steinweiler towards Neustadt (Weinstraße) Hbf	RB 51	Kandel towards Karlsruhe Hbf
Landau (Pfalz) Hbf towards Neustadt (Weinstraße) Hbf	RB 53	Schaidt (Pfalz) towards Wissembourg
Barbelroth towards Bad Bergzabern	RB 54	Terminus
Location

Winden (Pfalz) station is in the town of Winden in the German state of Rhineland-Palatinate and is its public transport node. At the station, the line to Wissembourg in Alsace branches off the Palatine Maximilian Railway (Pfälzische Maximiliansbahn), which runs from Neustadt an der Weinstraße to Karlsruhe. In addition, the Kurbadlinie ("Spa Line") branches off at the station to Bad Bergzabern. It is located at the eastern edge of the town. It is classified by Deutsche Bahn as a category 4 station.

== History ==
Winden station was opened in 1855 as an intermediate station on the Maximilian Railway (Neustadt–Landau–Wissembourg). Nine years later it became the interchange station with the opening of the second branch of the Maximilian Railway to Karlsruhe via Kandel and Wörth. Then in 1870 the Kurbadlinie was opened to Bergzabern.

The section of the Maximilian Railway to Wissembourg was closed in 1975 and the Kurbadlinie was closed in 1981. As a result, platform track 1a, from which trains to Bad Bergzabern started, was dismantled. Both lines, however, were reactivated in 1995 and 1997. The station also had an important role in handling the transport of sugar until this traffic was discontinued in 1993. The freight tracks were then also dismantled. Winden station was modernised from 2005 to 2007, with the raising of the platforms to 55 cm above the rail and the installation of lifts.

The platform canopy was originally built in a Romanesque style, but was replaced during the modernisation.

== Rail services ==
Three services an hour run towards Neustadt from platform 3. In the opposite direction, two services an hour run to Karlsruhe and one an hour to Wissembourg. These stop either on platform track one or two. The trains running every hour from Bergzabern stop on platform 2. Similarly, a regular bus route runs to Bad Bergzabern, mainly to serve the villages that lie off of the spa line.

The station is served by Regional-Express services on the Karlsruhe–Neustadt route (generally stopping in Landau, Winden, Kandel and Wörth and some stopping in the peak hour in Edenkoben, Karlsruhe-Knielingen, Karlsruhe-Mühlburg and Karlsruhe-West) and Regionalbahn services on the Karlsruhe–Neustadt route (stopping everywhere, except Karlsruhe Maxau and Maximiliansau Eisenbahnstraße) and the Neustadt–Wissembourg route (stopping at all stops, except on the section between Winden and Landau).

Line	Route	Frequency
RE 6	Neustadt (Weinstraße) – Landau (Pfalz) – Winden – Wörth (Rhein) – Karlsruhe	Hourly
RB 51	Neustadt (Weinstraße) – Landau (Pfalz) – Winden – Wörth (Rhein) – Karlsruhe	Hourly
RB 53	Neustadt (Weinstraße) – Landau (Pfalz) – Winden – Wissembourg	Hourly
RB 54	Winden – Bad Bergzabern	Hourly
