= Maximiliansau West station =

Railway station in Wörth, Germany

Maximiliansau West
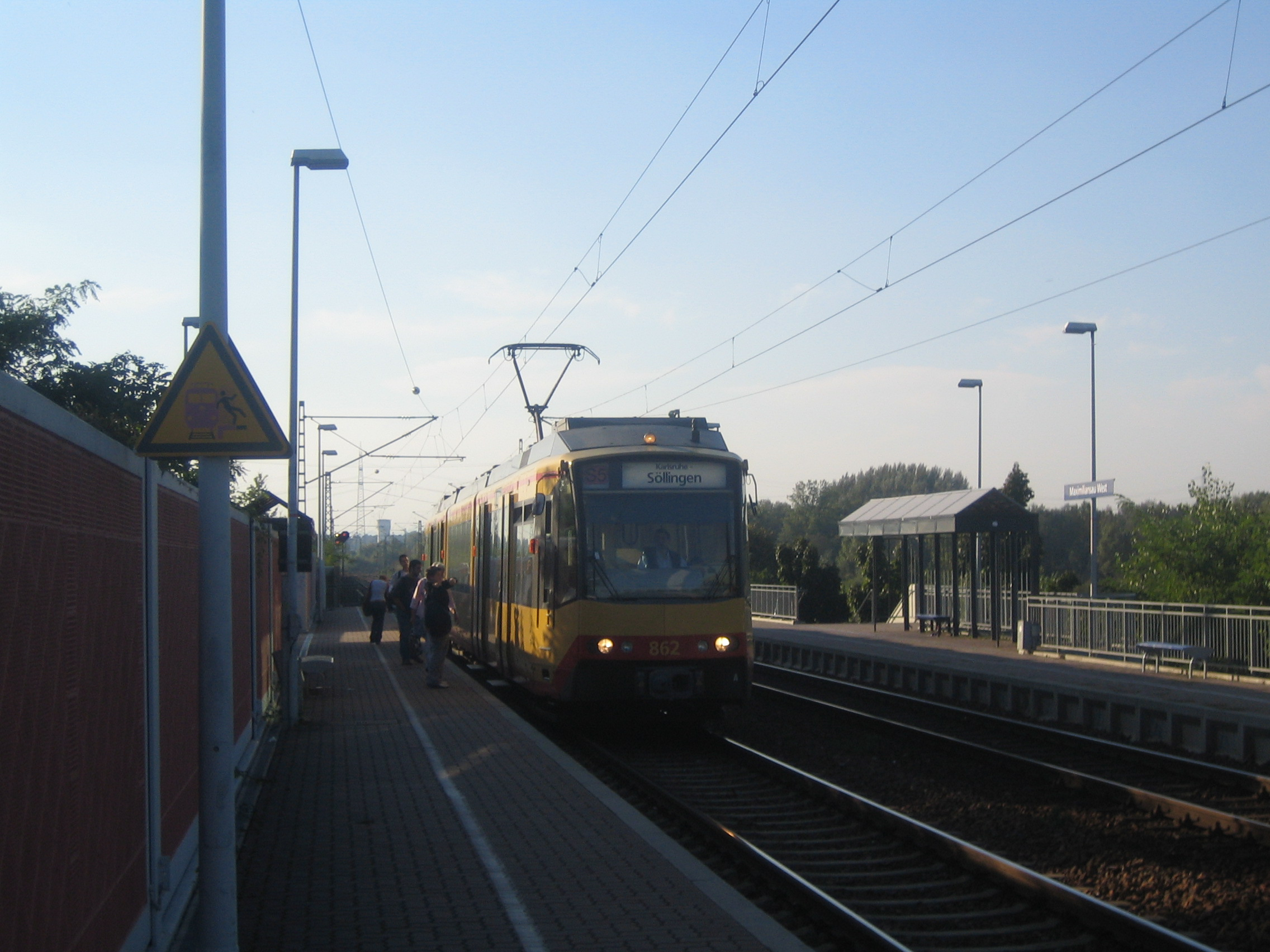
- 2005

General information
- Location: Wörth am Rhein; Rhineland-Palatinate; Germany
- Coordinates: 49.052360°N 8.249861°E
- System: Hp
- Owner: Albtal-Verkehrs-Gesellschaft
- Operator: Albtal-Verkehrs-Gesellschaft
- Lines: Winden–Karlsruhe (KBS 676)
- Platforms: 2 side platforms
- Tracks: 2
- Train operators: Karlsruhe Stadtbahn; DB Regio Mitte

Construction
- Cycle facilities: yes
- Accessible: no

Other information
- Fare zone: KVV: 540

Services
Preceding station	DB Regio Mitte	Following station
Wörth (Rhein) towards Neustadt (Weinstraße) Hbf	RB 51	Karlsruhe-Knielingen towards Karlsruhe Hbf
Preceding station	Karlsruhe Stadtbahn	Following station
Wörth (Rhein) towards Wörth Badepark	S 5	Maximiliansau Eisenbahnstraße towards Pforzheim Hbf
Wörth (Rhein) towards Germersheim	S 51	Maximiliansau Eisenbahnstraße towards Pforzheim Hbf
Wörth (Rhein) towards Germersheim	S 52	Maximiliansau Eisenbahnstraße towards Karlsruhe Marktplatz
Location
- Location within Rhineland-Palatinate Location within Germany Location within Europe

Maximiliansau West station is a light rail station on S 5, S 51 and S 52 lines of the Karlsruhe Stadtbahn system in the municipality of Wörth am Rhein, Rhineland-Palatinate, Germany. The station is also served by regional service RB 51 by DB Regio Mitte.

== Services ==
The station is served by the following S-Bahn service:

Line	Route		Frequency	Operator
RB 51	Neustadt (Weinstraße) – Wörth (Rhein) – Maximiliansau West – Karlsruhe		60 min	DB Regio Mitte
S 5	Wörth Badepark – Wörth Rathaus – Wörth (Rhein) – Maximiliansau West –Karlsruhe Marktplatz – Karlsruhe Tullastraße/Alter Schlachthof – Berghausen (Baden) – Söllingen (b. Karlsruhe) – Wilferdingen-Singen – Pforzheim		20 min	Karlsruhe Stadtbahn
S 51	Germersheim – Wörth (Rhein) – Maximiliansau West –	Karlsruhe Marktplatz – Karlsruhe Durlach – Berghausen (Baden) – Söllingen (b. Karlsruhe)	60 min	Karlsruhe Stadtbahn
S 52	Germersheim – Wörth (Rhein) – Maximiliansau West –	Karlsruhe Albtalbahnhof – Karlsruhe Marktplatz	60 min (morning and evening)	Karlsruhe Stadtbahn
