= Neustadt–Wissembourg railway =

Railway line in southwestern Germany

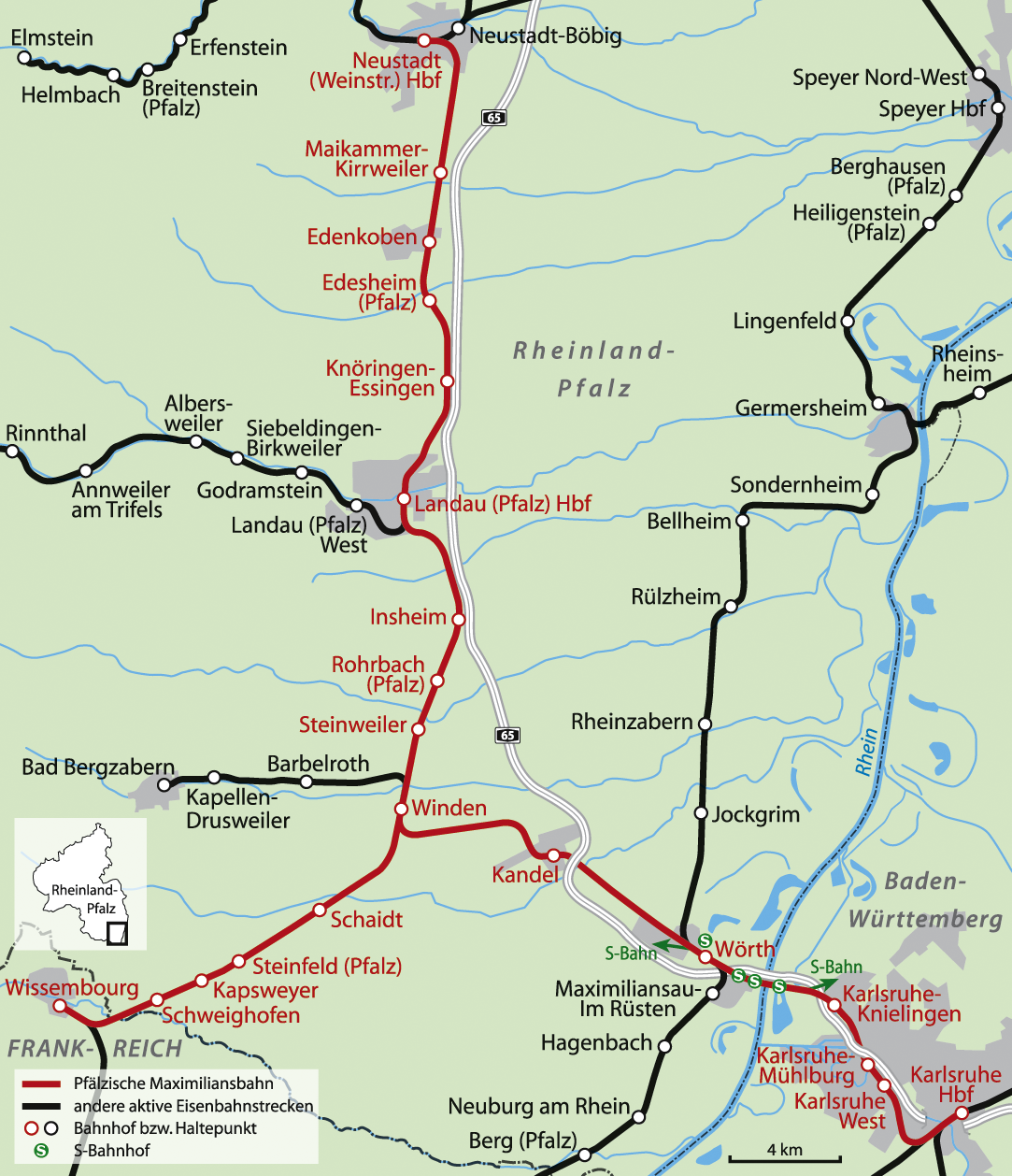

Overview
- Native name: Pfälzische Maximiliansbahn
- Line number: 3433 (Neustadt–state border); 3443 (Winden–Karlsruhe)
- Locale: Rhineland-Palatinate, Germany

Service
- Route number: 676 (Neustadt–Karlsruhe); 679 (Winden–Wissembourg)

Technical
- Line length: Neustadt–Wissembourg: 46.9 km Winden–Karlsruhe: 27.0 km
- Track gauge: 1,435 mm (4 ft 8 1/2 in)
- Operating speed: 140 km/h

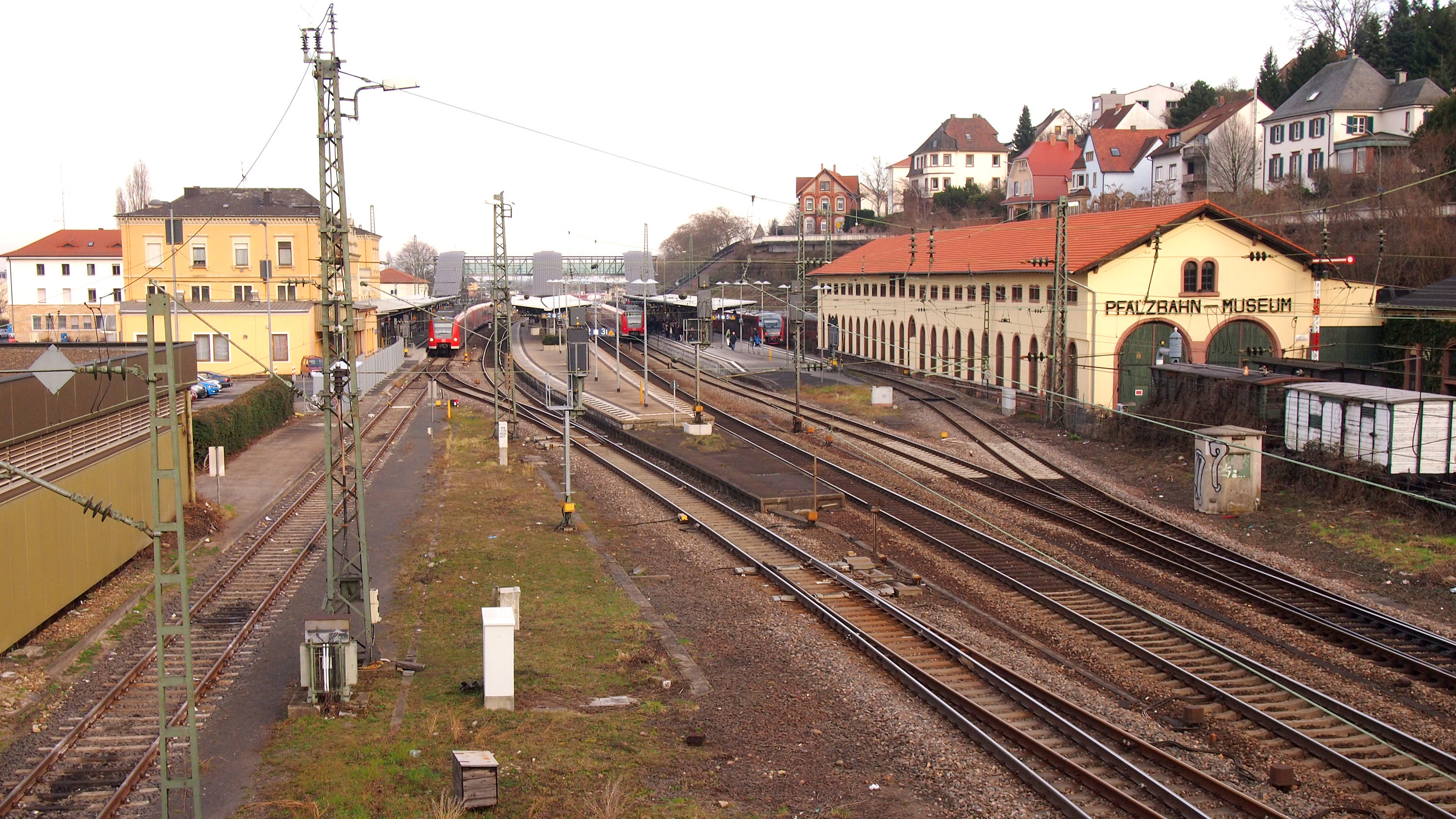
Neustadt (Weinstraße) Hauptbahnhof, the start of the Palatine Maximilian Railway

The Neustadt–Wissembourg railway, also called the Pfälzische Maximiliansbahn ("Palatine Maximilian Railway"), Maximiliansbahn or just the Maxbahn - is a railway line in southwestern Germany that runs from Neustadt an der Weinstrasse to Wissembourg (German: Weißenburg) in Alsace, France. The Palatine Maximilian Railway also included a branch (the Winden–Karlsruhe railway) from Winden via Wörth and the Maxaubahn to Karlsruhe.

== Overview ==
It was named by the Palatine Maximilian Railway Company, who had built the line, in honour of the reigning King of Bavaria at that time, King Maximilian II.

Built as a transit route, the line acted as part of a long-distance, north–south, trunk route for the first few decades. It lost this important role completely in 1930, whilst the Winden−Karlsruhe section, originally built as a branch, experienced an upturn, as a consequence of which the Winden−Wissembourg section in particular was sidelined. As a result, passenger services on the latter ceased in 1975, but were reinstated in 1997. Goods traffic on the Maximiliansbahn reduced sharply from the 1990s.

== Route ==
Apart from the Winden–Wörth and Winden–Wissembourg sections the line is double-tracked throughout. From Neustadt to Winden in runs mostly past the vineyards along the German Wine Route in the Palatinate, which however peter out towards the south. The Palatine Forest however remains constantly in its view. On the Winden–Wissembourg section, it passes for most of its length the heathlands, the so-called "cattle belt" (Viehstrich) and runs along the western edge of the Bienwald forest.

The Winden–Karlsruhe section runs as far as Kandel through farming country and, between Kandel and Wörth cuts through the Bienwald. Crossing the Rhine it passes Rheinauen and the edge of Knielingen, before the former Hardt Railway (Graben-Neudorf – Eggenstein – Karlsruhe) joins the Maxbahn and together they run via the stations of Karlsruhe-Mühlburg and Karlsruhe-West to reach Karlsruhe Hauptbahnhof, the city's main station where they end either at platform 1 or 101. Between Wörth and Karlsruhe the line is electrified.

The railway runs through various rural counties (Landkreise): The stations from Neustadt an der Weinstrasse to Rohrbach and from Steinfeld to Schweighofen are – with the exception of the independent towns (Kreisfreie Stadt) of Neustadt an der Weinstrasse and Landau – in the county of Südliche Weinstrasse, the stations from Steinweiler to Maximiliansau Eisenbahnstrasse and Schaidt in the county of Germersheim; the stations from Maxau to Karlsruhe Hauptbahnhof in the city of Karlsruhe, and Wissembourg in the French county (Arrondissement) of Wissembourg in the Département of Bas-Rhin.

== History ==
=== Planning and construction ===
The first deliberations over the construction of the line go back to 1829. The intention was a trunk route from Strasbourg to Mainz, that would form a counterpart, west of the Rhine, to a railway from Mannheim to Basel. It was discussed at length, whether it was more pressing and desirable to build a route through the uplands from Neustadt via Landau to Wissembourg or to establish a railway line along the Rhine via Speyer, Germersheim and Wörth. The military in particular favoured a course that ran along the edge of the Palatine Forest. In any case the political events of 1848 meant the project came to a standstill.

In January 1850 a brochure appeared in Neustadt an der Haardt (now Neustadt an der Weinstrasse) which pushed for a railway via Landau to Wissembourg and in which it was argued amongst other things should serve the larger townships rather than those immediately alongside the Rhine. In 1852 the decision finally fell in favour of the higher route after expert opinion and studies had been conducted in the spring. On 3 November that same year the Bavarian king, Maximilian II, gave the green light for the construction, by approving the foundation of a limited company (Aktiengesellschaft), that was to set the project in motion.

The Maximilian Railway was built by Paul Camille von Denis, who had already been responsible for building the Palatine Ludwig Railway from Saarbrücken to the Rheinschanze (today: Ludwigshafen), from which the railway branched. The cost of building the railway came to four million Gulden in all.

Finally negotiations took place over the land to be used with the communities that the line would affect; in addition railway construction in the area of Landau was particularly difficult, because at that time it there was a fortification on the terrain intended for the railway.

=== The Maximilian Railway Company era (1855–1909) ===
On 18 July 1855 the section of line from Neustadt to Landau was opened, the Landau–Wissembourg section followed on 26 November 1855. On 14 March 1864 the Winden–Maximiliansau stretch was opened and on 8 May 1865 the link between Maximiliansau and the Baden Maxaubahn (Karlsruhe–Maxau) was completed.

In 1867 the Neustadt to Winden section was doubled, primarily to meet the increase in north–south traffic. In 1871 the section between Winden and Wissembourg - now belonging to Germany and renamed Weißenburg - was also furnished with a double track. This measure was implemented against the background that the Palatinate was alarmed about the competition for long-distance services, especially from Prussia.

The main station at Landau was rebuilt and considerably expanded in 1872 on the opening of the Lower Queich Valley railway (Untere Queichtalbahn - Germersheim–Landau).

=== Development to 1945 ===
On 1 January 1909 the Maximilian Railway was transferred, along with the other companies belonging to the Palatinate Railway to the ownership of the Royal Bavarian State Railways.

At that time the Maximilian Railway together with the Ludwigshafen–Strasbourg railway were in competition with the Baden railways for long-distance traffic. The long-haul trains on the Maximilian Railway worked the Amsterdam – Cologne – Bingerbrück – Rockenhausen – Neustadt – Wissembourg – Strasbourg – Basel route. Once the World War I had broken out in 1914, scheduled services came to a standstill in order that the line could be guaranteed for military purposes.

After the end of the war the Alsace was annexed by France under the terms of the Versailles Treaty. In particular the railway, that from 1920 was operated by the Deutsche Reichsbahngesellschaft (DRG), largely lost its importance for long-distance traffic, because from then on most of it switched to the eastern side of the Rhine. the occupation of the Palatinate by the French made operations even more difficult. From 1923 to 1924, a so-called Regiebetrieb (i.e. publicly owned but independently run) operation was set up that was answerable to France. The final demise of long-distance services came after the end of French occupation in 1930.

After the end of the 1930s the main services on the Maximilian Railway flowed increasingly towards Karlsruhe, which is why in 1938 a fixed bridge across the Rhine was built between Maximiliansau and Karlsruhe for the first time; in addition the Saarbrücken–München express trains, that previously ran on the Lower Queich Valley railway from Landau to Germersheim, were routed from now on via Winden, Wörth and Karlsruhe. This switch meant that the Winden–Wissembourg section lost its importance, whilst the former branch to Karlsruhe experienced an upturn. At the beginning of 1945 traffic ceased as a result of the end of the World War II.

=== The Deutsche Bahn era (since 1945) ===
After the Second World War the station building at Landau, that had suffered badly from the war, was gradually replaced by a brand new building. The second track on the section of line between Winden and Wörth was dismantled by the French occupying powers. In 1975 public transit ceased on the Winden–Wissembourg section, and it was finally reduced to a single track.

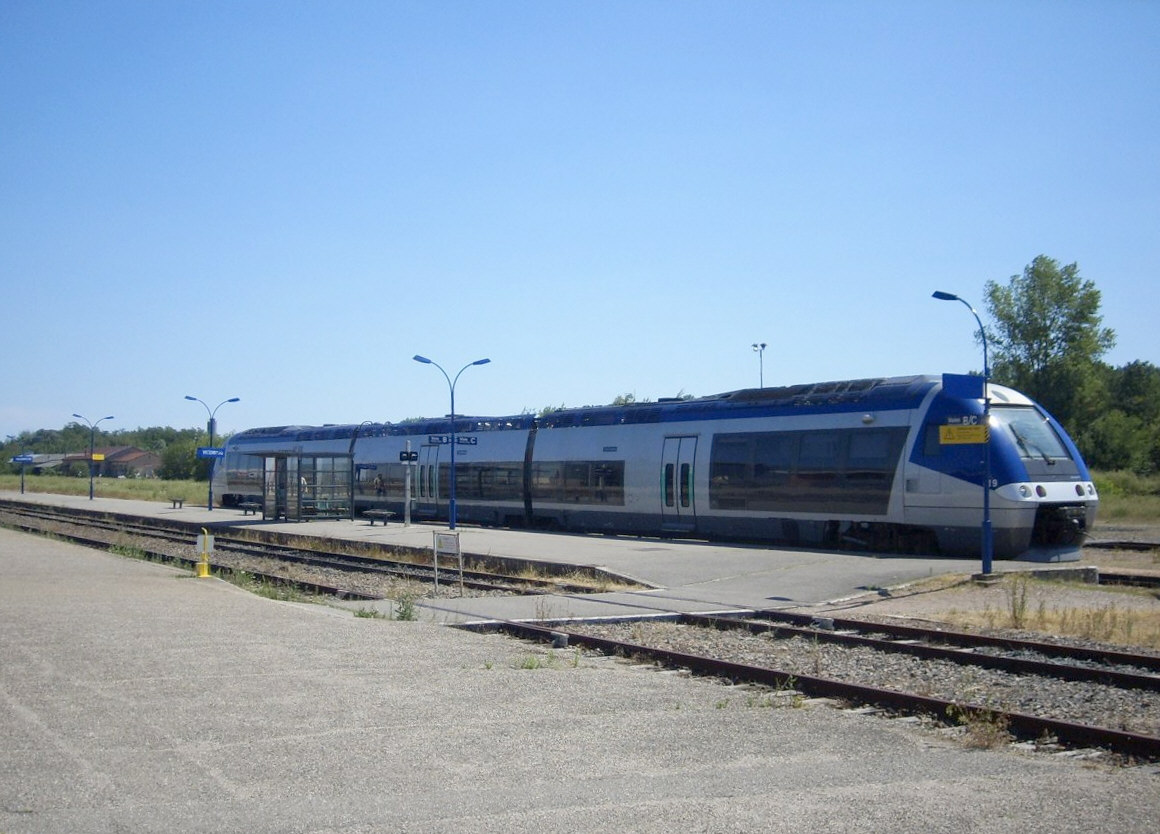
View of Wissembourg station, the southern end of the Maximiliansbahn; the TER waits for the onward journey to Haguenau and Strasbourg

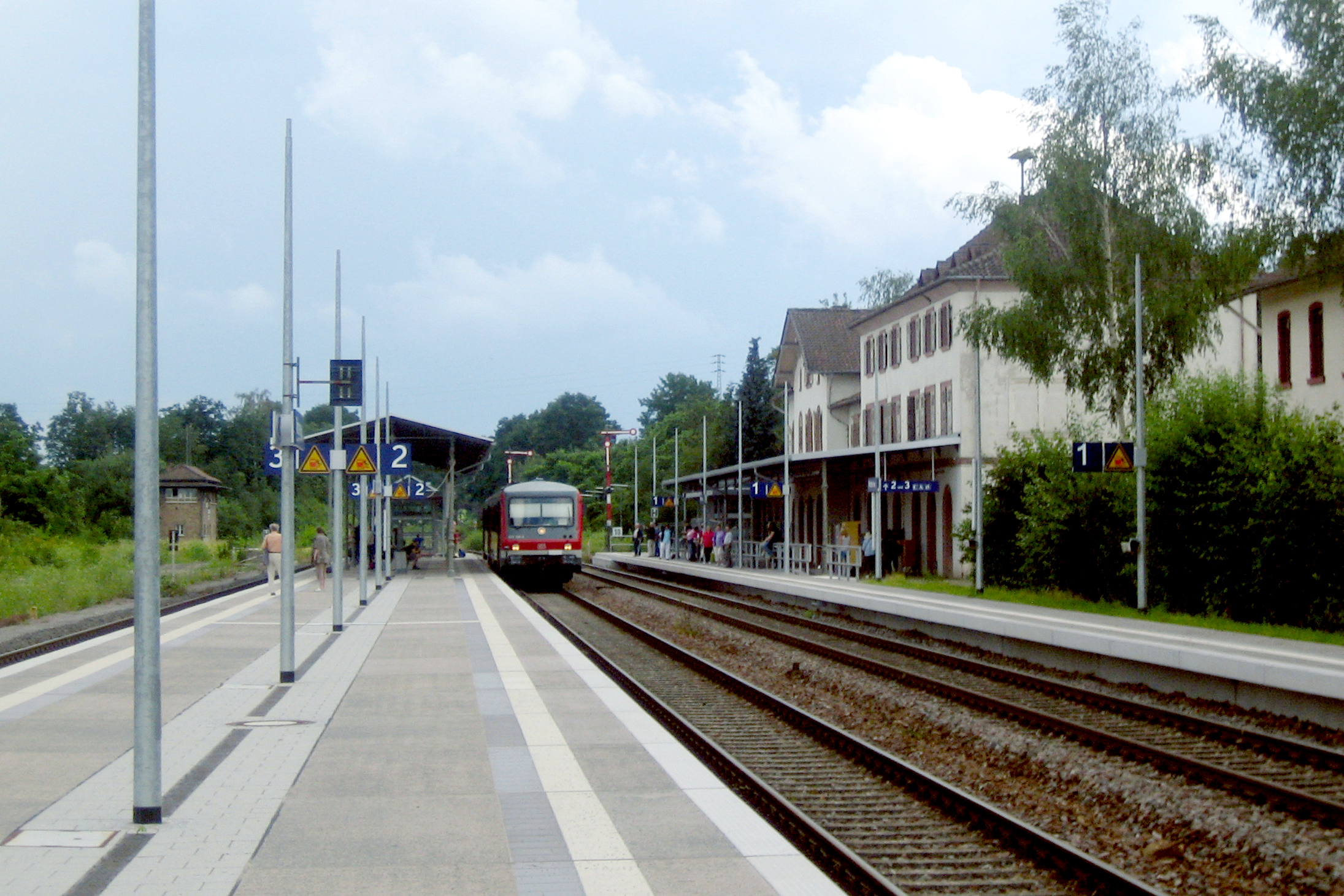
Winden station after its modernisation in 2007

In 1985 express trains from Munich to Saarbrücken started running on the Karlsruhe–Landau line. These trains called at Landau in order to use the Queichtalbahn to Saarbrücken. After a shipping accident that occurred in 1987, a new bridge over the Rhine had to be built at Maxau. The bridge was opened on 29 April 1991 with one track and in 2000 was expanded to take a second track because it had become a bottleneck. The second track was opened to traffic on 12 May 2000.

At the beginning of the 1990s the depot (Bahnbetriebswerk) in Landau was closed and knocked down. Landau marshalling yard also disappeared. In 1994 through traffic from Karlsruhe to Neustadt in Landau was interrupted for several years; instead trains were route via the Queichtalbahn Pirmasens–Landau as far as Neustadt. In addition in March 1997 the Winden–Wissembourg line was reactivated.

In 2003 the main station at Neustadt was modernised as part of the introduction of RheinNeckar S-Bahn onto the Palatine Ludwig Railway.

From 1 to 3 October 2005 steam trains belonging to the Ulmer Eisenbahnfreunde (UEF) ran on the Maxbahn on the occasion of its 150th anniversary. The steam trains travelled on a circuit: Neustadt – Landau – Winden – Karlsruhe – Graben-Neudorf – Germersheim – Speyer – Schifferstadt – Neustadt and also from Neustadt to Wissembourg. Some hauled the so-called Silberlings of the Deutsche Bahn (DB). Kandel station was upgraded just in time for these celebrations.

== Operations ==
=== Timetable ===
Although through trains run today from Neustadt to Wissembourg, the Neustadt–Winden section today belongs operationally to the Neustadt–Karlsruhe line. The Karlsruhe–Neustadt railway is numbered KBS 676 and Winden–Wissembourg as KBS 679.

A Regionalbahn (RB) and a Regionalexpress (RE) train run hourly from Karlsruhe to Neustadt and every hour a Regionalbahn train goes from Neustadt to Wissembourg, it does not stop between Landau and Winden however. The Regionalbahn trains from Karlsruhe to Neustadt stop at all the stations apart from Maximiliansau Eisenbahnstrasse and Maxau. Maximiliansau Eisenbahnstrasse and Maxau are served by the Karlsruhe Stadtbahn (light rail) line S5 (Wörth Dorschberg–Bietigheim-Bissingen), which follows the Maximilian Railway from Wörth to Maxau and switches to street running in the Karlsruhe district of Knielingen.

On Sundays and public holidays from May to October five pairs of long distance regional and excursion trains run:

- The Alsace Express (Elsass-Express) from Mainz Hauptbahnhof via the Alzey–Mainz railway and Palatine Northern Railway to Wissembourg.
- The Rhine Valley Express (Rheintal-Express) from Karlsruhe via the Palatine Ludwig Railway, Alsenztalbahn, Nahetalbahn and West Rhine railway to Koblenz Hauptbahnhof.
- The Wine Road Express (Weinstrassen-Express) from Koblenz Hauptbahnhof travelling in the opposite direction to the Rhine Valley Express to Wissembourg.
- The Bundenthaler from Mannheim Hauptbahnhof via the Palatine Ludwig Railway and the Felsenland-Express from Karlsruhe Hauptbahnhof with the combined route via the Queichtalbahn and Wieslauterbahn to its terminus at Bundenthal-Rumbach.

In addition a pair of trains under the name Strasbourg Express runs all year round at weekends without stopping from Neustadt to Strasbourg Gare Centrale.

The Palatine Maximilian Railway can be used in the whole of the Rhineland-Palatinate and French sections with passes issued by the Verkehrsverbund Rhein-Neckar including Maximiliansau Eisenbahnstrasse. The Karlsruher Verkehrsverbund is valid from Karlsruhe outwards on the entire line as far as Wissembourg and including Maikammer-Kirrweiler, where a transfer fare is available for the journey to Neustadt (Weinstrasse) Hauptbahnhof.

=== Motive power ===
Because the Rhine bridge between Karlsruhe and Wörth was initially a pontoon bridge, locomotives of the Palatine Class T 2.I were employed just to cross the river.

Since 1997 Regionalexpress (RE) trains run on the Maximilians Railway stopping en route in Wörth, Kandel, Winden and Landau. Initially tilting trains of DB Class 611 were used. However they proved very unreliable and were replaced only a few years later by the DB Class 612, which has since been used for most RE trains on the line.

Since the 1980s DB Class 628 engines have been used for Regionalbahn services, which in turn had replaced the earlier railbuses. DB Class 612 units usually power the Regionalexpress trains, more rarely seen are trains are hauled by DB Class 218 locomotives and comprising red-liveried Silberlings.

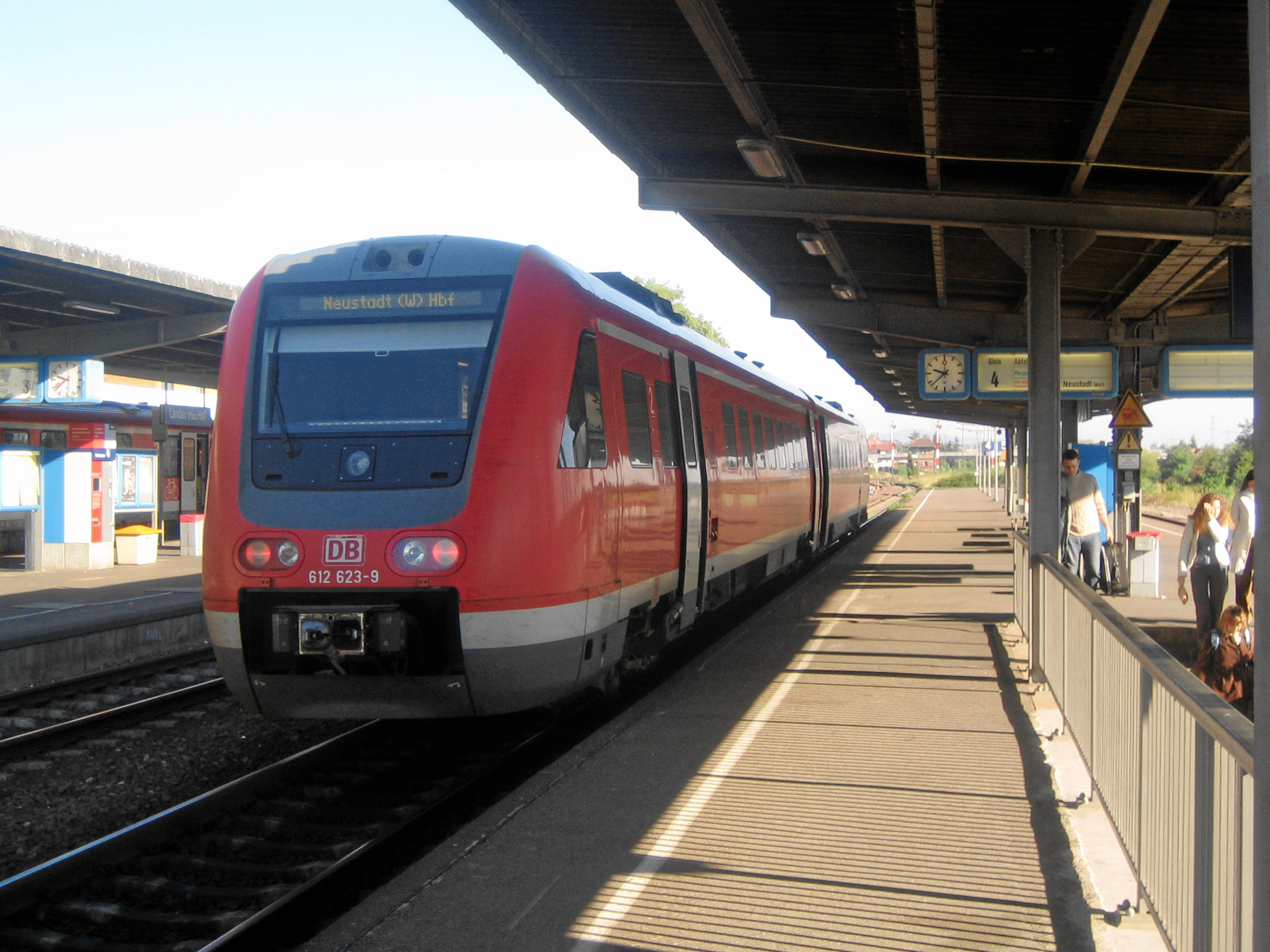
Regional express to Neustadt at Landau Hbf

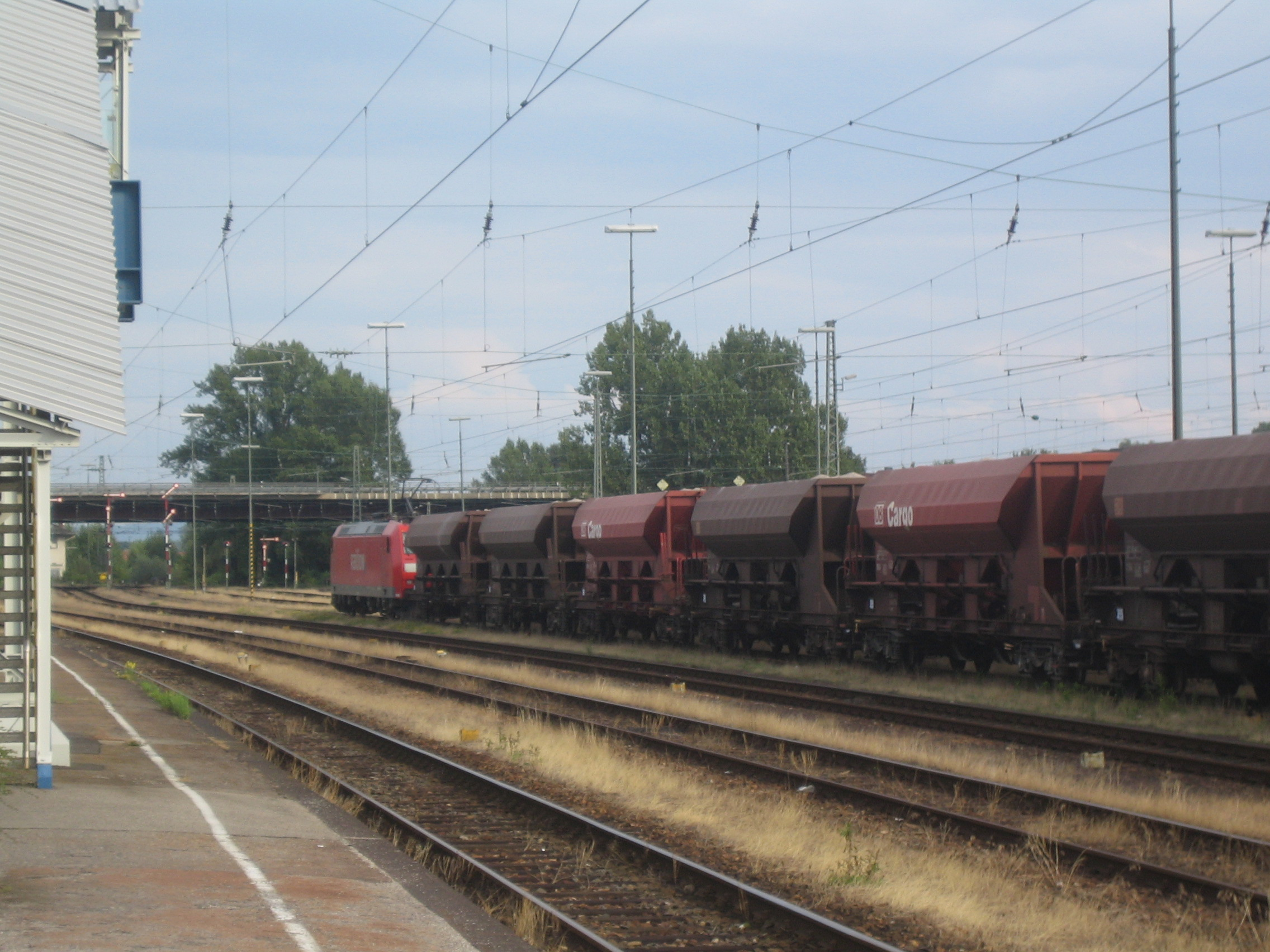
Goods train at Wörth station

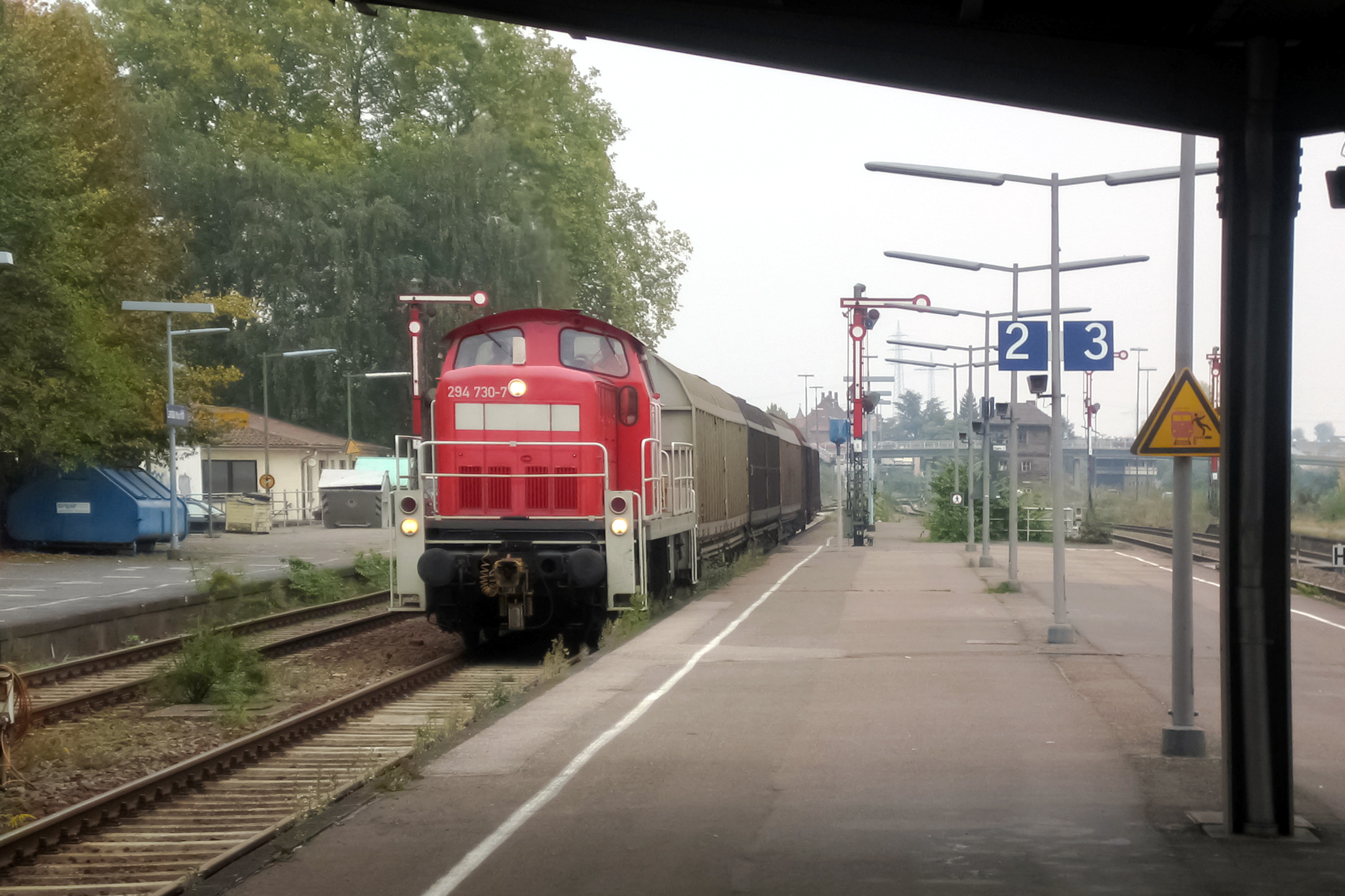
Goods train at Landau Hauptbahnhof

=== Goods traffic ===
There is a lot of goods traffic between Karlsruhe and Wörth, and to the Wörth flooded gravel pits, the Mercedes-Benz lorry factory there and the Wörth harbour on the Rhine, which is why this section has been electrified since 1974. Between Wörth and Winden, Wissembourg and Winden, and at the junction of Winden to Landau goods traffic has however since reduced to nothing, which is clear from the extent of dismantling in the stations at Kandel, Winden, Rohrbach, Landau and Maikammer-Kirrweiler as well as the former station at Schaidt. The stations of Kandel, Winden and Schaidt were formerly very important for the transportation of sugar beet, because there were loading facilities at which the sugar beet could be cross-loaded from farm vehicles onto goods wagons. With the Deutsche Bahn exit from this type of transportation in the nineties the loading facilities were dismantled and the transport of sugar beet to the sugar factories switched to the road.

Apart from the Wörth–Karlsruhe section and Landauer Hauptbahnhof, the only remaining industrial branches are in Edenkoben. These have not been used for years however. The stub track in the Edenkoben industrial estate of Seewiesen was completely and irrevocably cut off from the station with the removal of track 3, because the pedestrian underpass was built on its trackbed.

With the introduction of the new electronic signal box at Neustadt part of the wye was removed. Since then goods trains can no longer run directly to Ludwigshafen but must reverse into the main station. Even the passenger train from Pirmasens Hauptbahnhof to BASF has to reverse in Neustadt Hbf as before without stopping to run through from Maikammer-Kirrweiler to Hassloch.

In addition there are in Landau numerous goods sidings, that ran into the town centre, that have since completely disappeared, although sometimes the trackbeds are still visible as overgrown paths between the buildings and squares. At midday a goods train still runs daily from Neustadt to Landau.

== Sources ==
=== Further reading ===
- Faszination Eisenbahn - Heimat-Jahrbuch 2008 Landkreis Südliche Weinstraße, Verlag Franz Arbogast Otterbach, ISSN 0177-8684
- Michael Heilmann, Werner Schreiner, 150 Jahre Maximiliansbahn Neustadt-Straßburg, pro MESSAGE, Ludwigshafen am Rhein, 2005, ISBN 3-934845-27-4
- Modell- und Eisenbahnclub Landau in der Pfalz e.V., 125 Jahre Maximiliansbahn Neustadt/Weinstr.-Landau/Pfalz, Landau in der Pfalz, 1980
- Klaus D. Holzborn, Eisenbahn-Reviere Pfalz, transpress, Berlin, 1993, ISBN 3-344-70790-6
- Albert Mühl, Die Pfalzbahn. Geschichte, Betrieb und Fahrzeuge der Pfälzischen Eisenbahnen, Theiss Verlag, Stuttgart, 1982, ISBN 3-8062-0301-6
- Heinz Sturm, Die pfälzischen Eisenbahnen, pro MESSAGE, Ludwigshafen am Rhein, 2005, ISBN 3-934845-26-6
- Hansjürgen Wenzel, Die Südwestdeutschen Eisenbahnen in der französischen Zonen (SWDE), EK-Verlag, Wuppertal, 1976, ISBN 3-88255-821-0
