= Maxau Railway =

Railway line extending from Karlsruhe, Germany

The Maxau Railway (German: Maxaubahn) was a 9.7 kilometre long, railway line opened in 1862, that linked the old Karlsruhe station with the Rhine at Knielingen, near to the Maxau estate. After the completion of a pontoon over the Rhine, in 1865 the link to the Palatine railway network at Maximiliansau was completed. The line was built by the city of Karlsruhe and operated by the Grand Duchy of Baden State Railway and later taken over by the Baden state railways. In the course of several renovations in 1895, 1913 and 1938 the course of the line was changed and the original trackbed was given up. During its existence the line provided access to the industrial and port facilities in western Karlsruhe as well as the link between the Baden and Palatine railway networks as part of the Karlsruhe–Landau–Neustadt link.

== See also ==
- Palatine Maximilian Railway

== Sources ==
- Karl Müller, Die badischen Eisenbahnen in historisch-statistischer Darstellung, Heidelberger Verlagsanstalt, 1904, S. 125-130
- Ernst Otto Bräunche (Hrsg.), Rheinhafen Karlsruhe 1901-2001, INFO Verlag, Karlsruhe 2001
