= Wörth am Rhein =

- Town
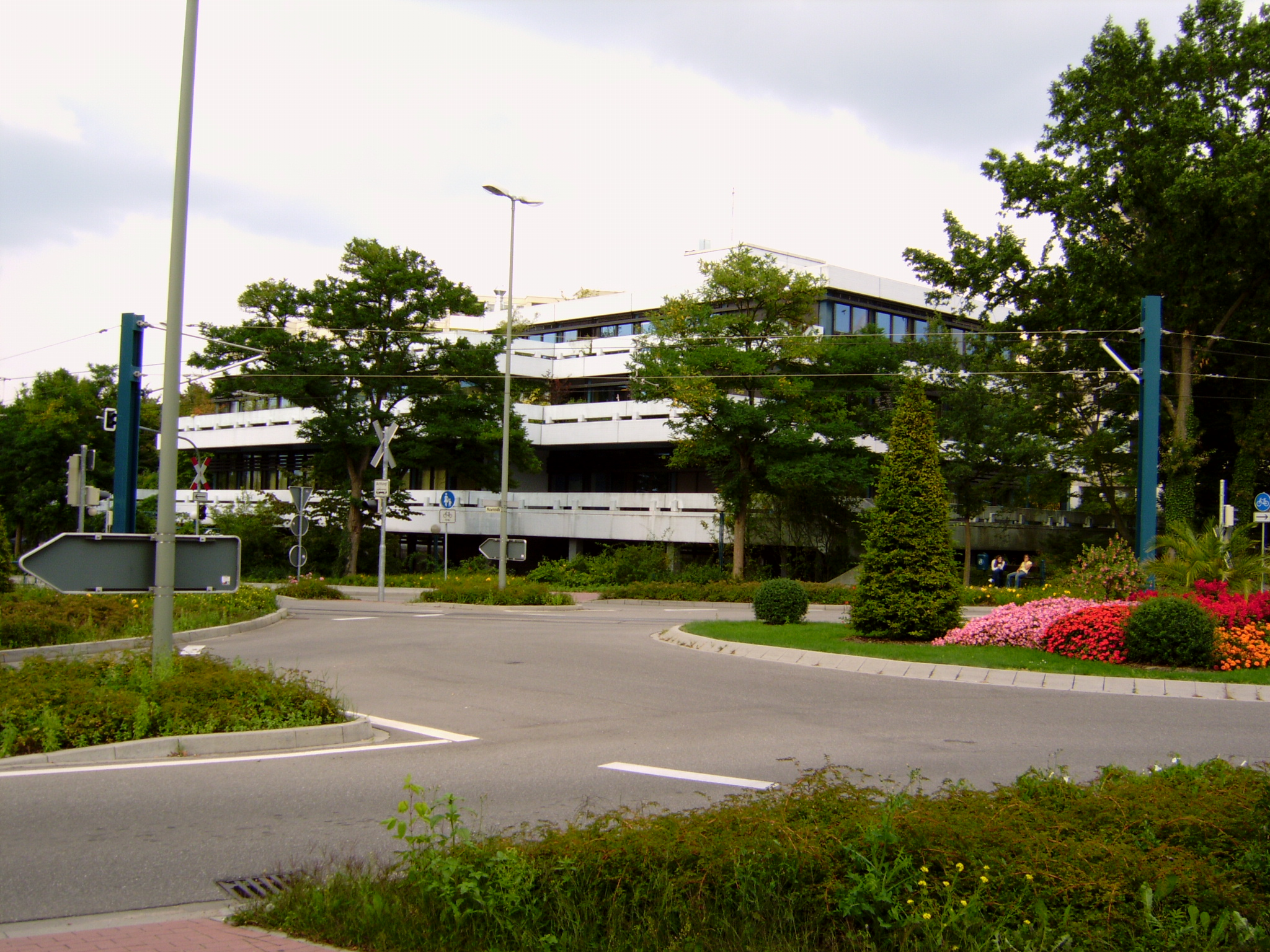
- Town hall

- Coat of arms

- Location of Wörth am Rhein within Germersheim district
- Interactive map of Wörth am Rhein
- Location within Germany Location within Rhineland-Palatinate
- Coordinates: 49°3′6″N 8°15′37″E
- Country: Germany
- State: Rhineland-Palatinate
- District: Germersheim
- Subdivisions: 4 Ortsbezirke

Government
  - Mayor (2024–32): Steffen Weiß

Area
  - Total: 131.62 km^{2} (50.82 sq mi)
- Elevation: 104 m (341 ft)

Population (2025-12-31)
  - Total: 18,350
  - Density: 139.4/km^{2} (361.1/sq mi)
- Time zone: UTC+01:00 (CET)
  - Summer (DST): UTC+02:00 (CEST)
- Postal codes: 76730–76744
- Dialling codes: 07271 (Wörth am Rhein) 07277 (Wörth-Büchelberg) 06340 (Wörth-Schaidt)
- Vehicle registration: GER
- Website: www.woerth.de

Wörth am Rhein (German pronunciation: [ˈvœʁt ʔam ˈʁaɪn], lit. 'Wörth on the Rhine') is a town in the southernmost part of the district of Germersheim, in Rhineland-Palatinate, Germany. It is on the left bank of the Rhine approximately 10 km west of the city centre of Karlsruhe and is just north of the German-French border. A large (2.8 km²) Daimler Truck production plant has been located in the town since 1960.

== Mayors ==
- 1960–1980: Karl-Josef Stöffler (CDU)
- 1980–2016: Harald Seiter (CDU)
- 2016–2024: Dennis Nitsche (SPD)
- since 2024: Steffen Weiß

== Gallery ==
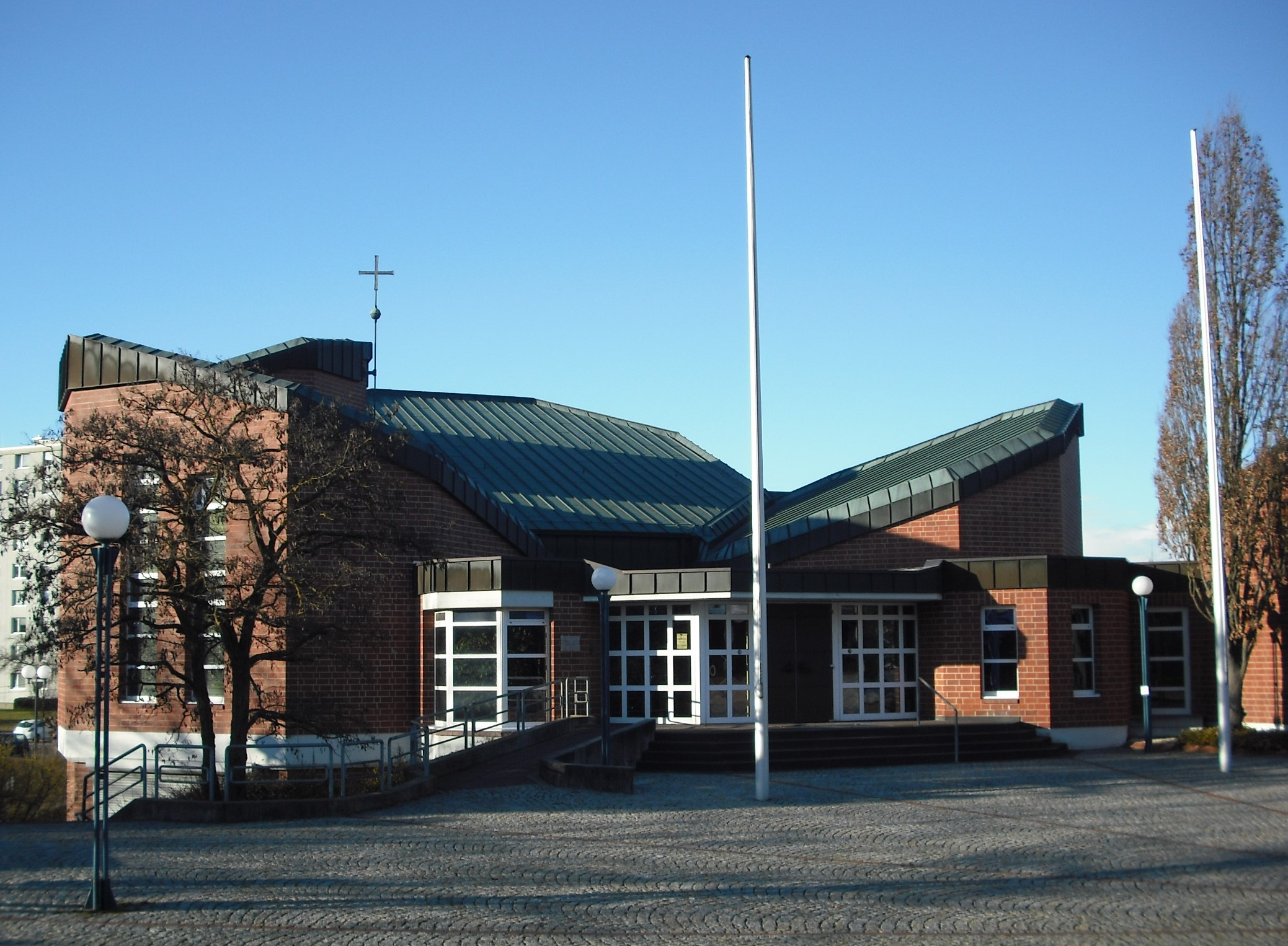
Friedenskirche (Peace church)

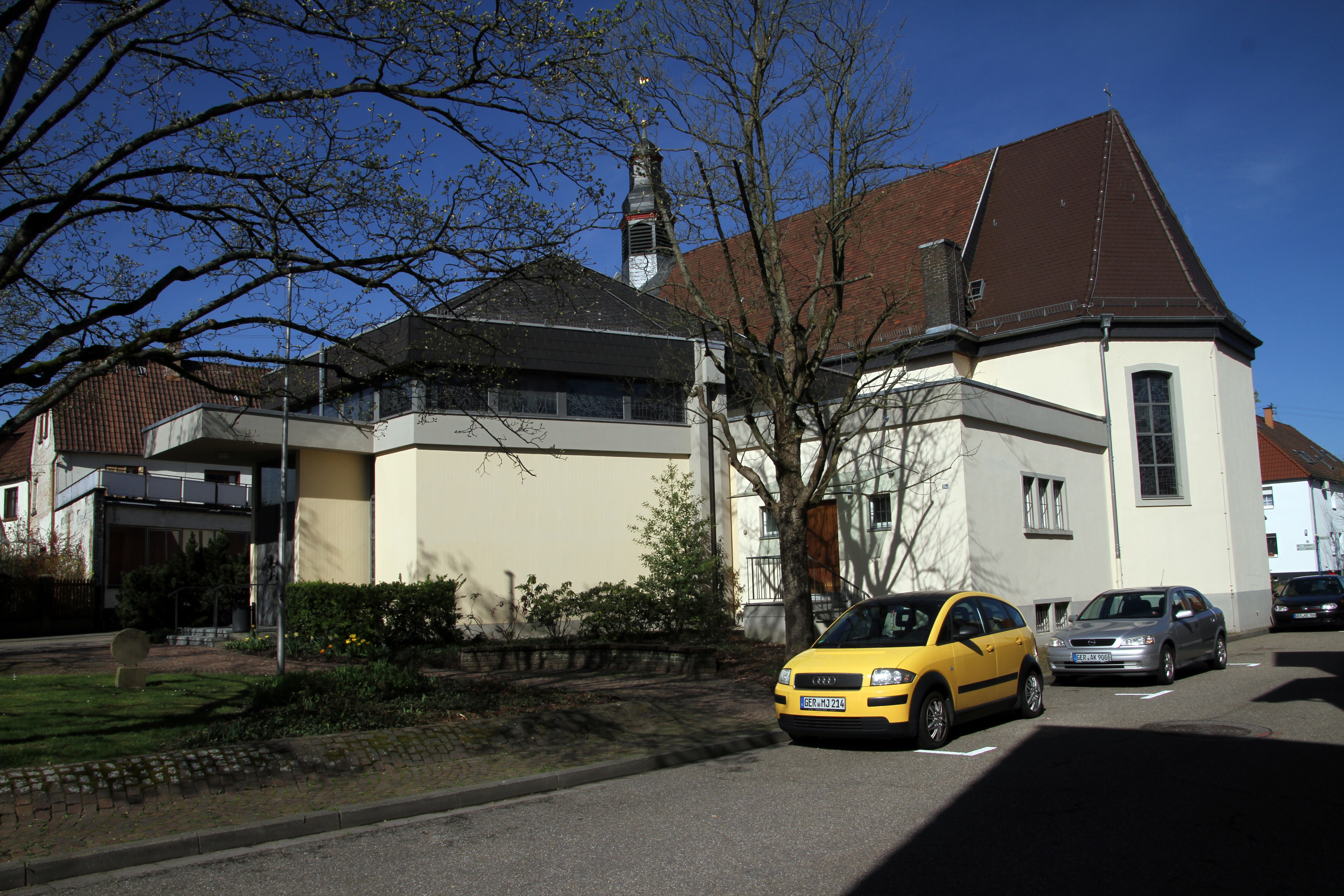
St. Laurentius in Wörth-Büchelberg

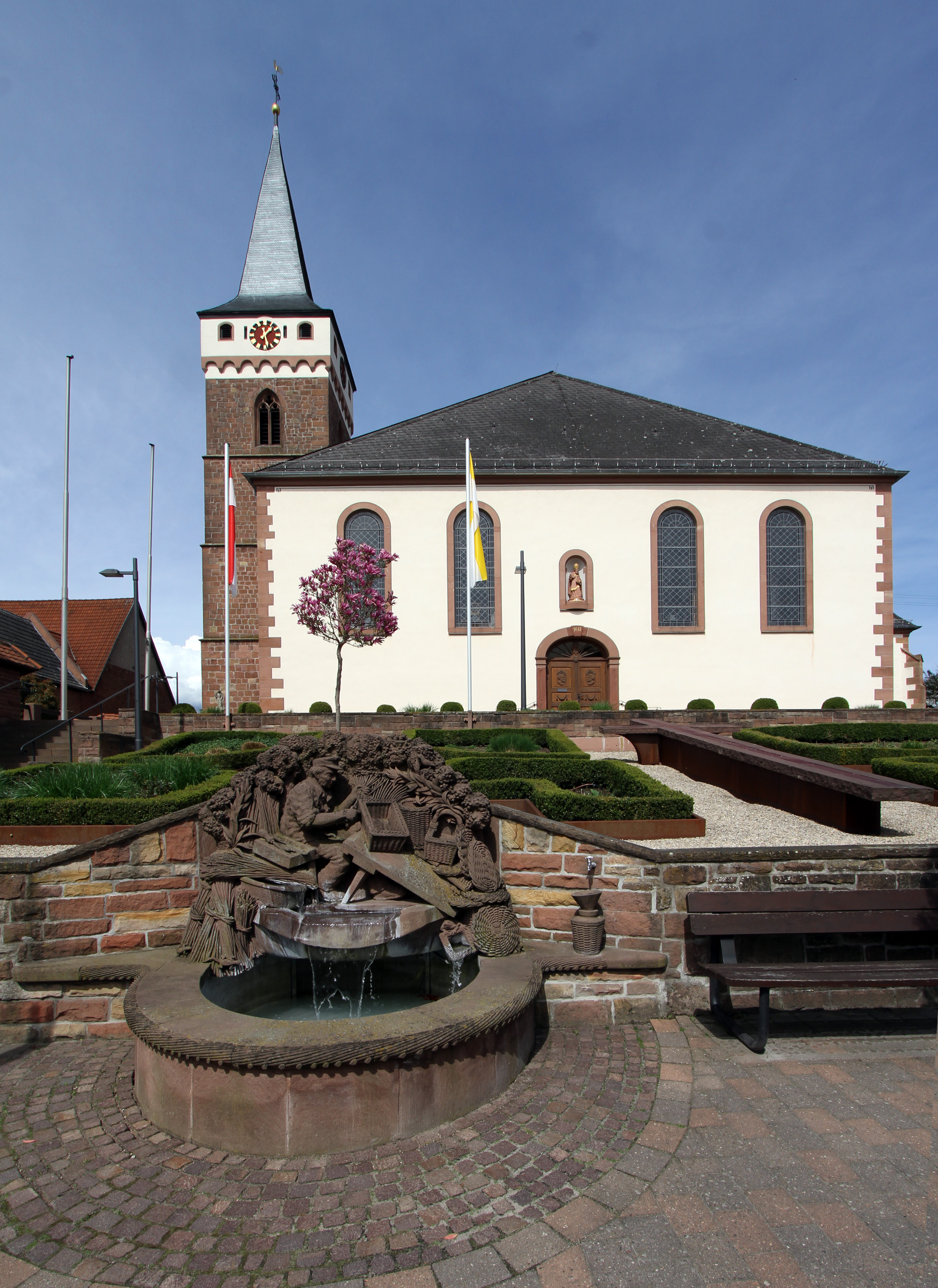
St. Leo in Wörth-Schaidt

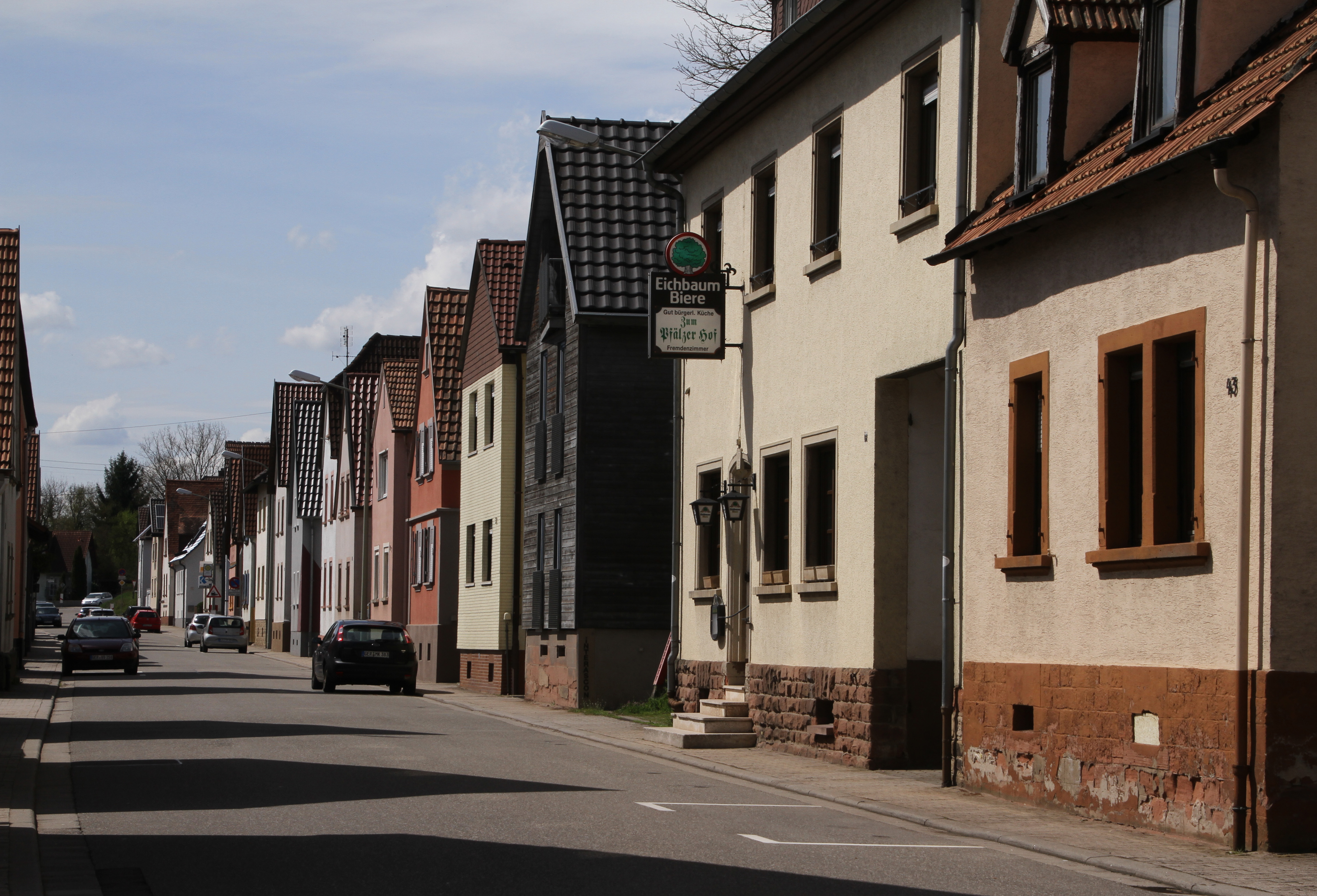
Wörth-Schaidt

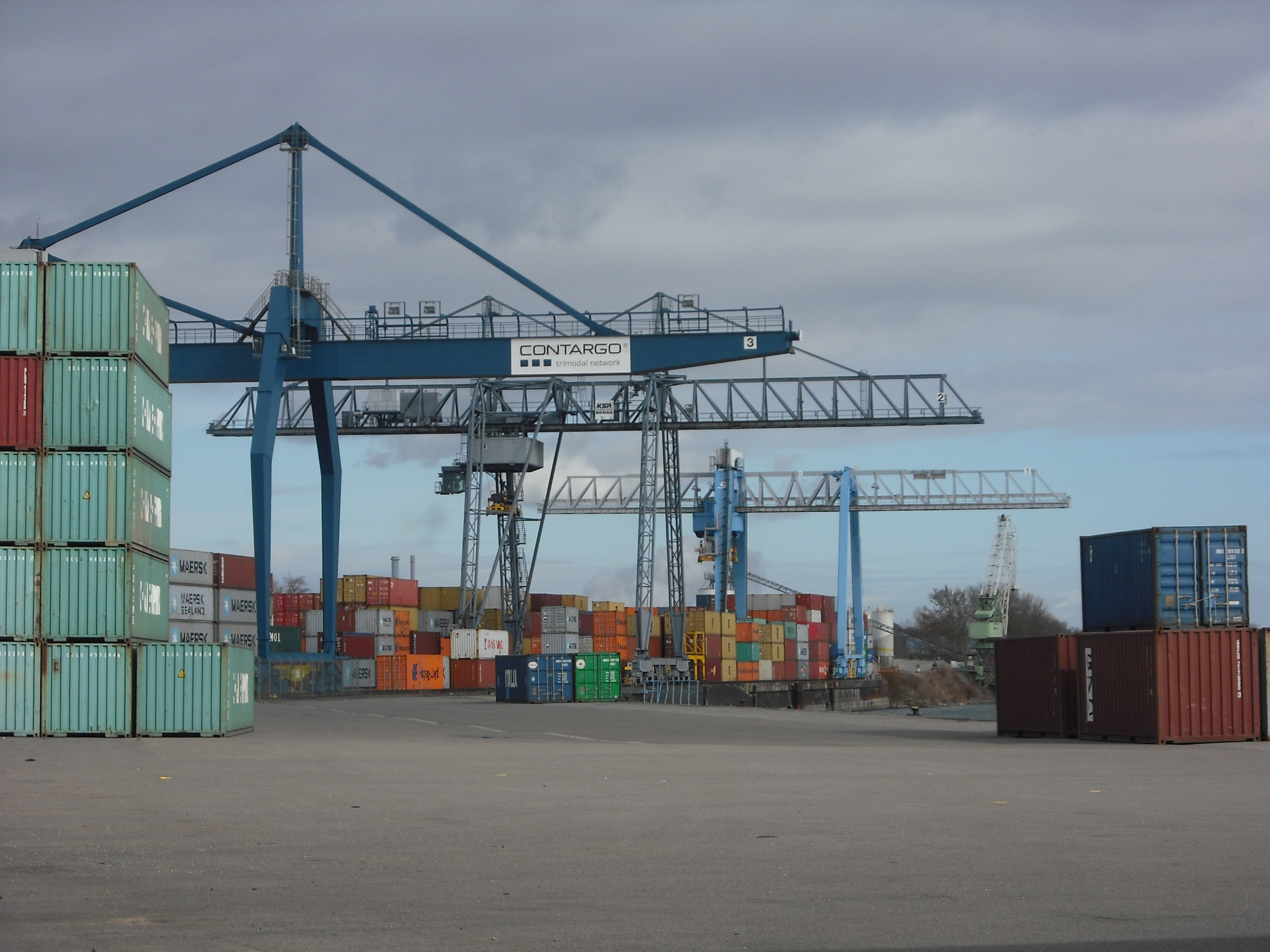
Wörth harbour

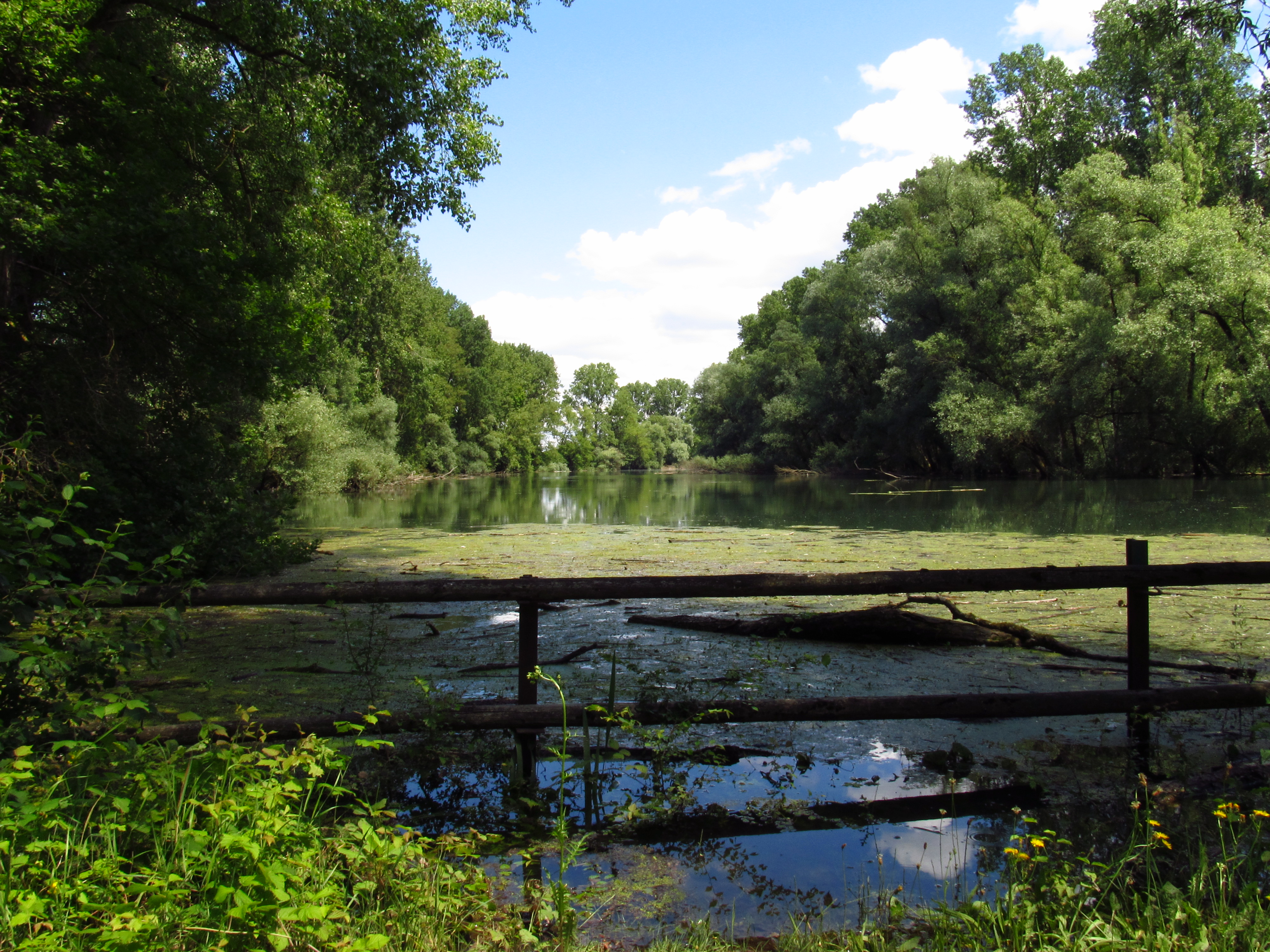
Rhine water meadows Nature reserve area

== Notable people ==
- Ferdinand Brossart (1849–1930), 1915-1923 Bishop of the Diocese of Covington, Kentucky, United States.
- Ludwig Damminger (1913–1981), footballer

=== Linked to town ===
- Kevin Akpoguma (born 1995), German footballer who played in his youth for FC Bavaria Wörth
- Friedel Grützmacher (born 1942), former Landtag deputy (Alliance 90/The Greens) lived in Wörth
- Tobias Lindner (born 1982), Bundestag deputy (Alliance 90/The Greens) who lives in Wörth
- Petrissa Solja (born 1994), table tennis player
- Herbert Wetterauer (born 1957), artist and author who lives in Wörth
- Wynkyn de Worde (unknown birth date; died c. 1534), printer and publisher in London who was possibly born in Wörth am Rhein
- Marlene Zapf (born 1990), handball player who grew up in Wörth
