= List of rail services in Rhineland-Palatinate =

This article lists all rail services in Rhineland-Palatinate.

== Local and regional services ==
The services of the Rhineland-Palatinate integrated regular-interval timetable (Rheinland-Pfalz-Takt) are summarised below.

- Sections outside of the Rhineland-Palatinate are in italics.

=== Lines 1–9 ===
Line	Service name	Route	KBS	Operator	Usual rolling stock
RE 1	Südwest-Express	Koblenz – Treis-Karden – Cochem – Wittlich – Trier – Dillingen – Saarbrücken – Kaiserslautern – Mannheim	690, 685, 670	DB Regio Mitte	Stadler Flirt 3 (429.1)
RE 2	Südwest-Express	Frankfurt Hbf – Frankfurt Airport Regional – Rüsselsheim – Mainz Hbf – Bingen (Rhein) Hbf – Boppard Hbf – Koblenz Hbf	471	DB Regio Mitte	Stadler Flirt
RE 3	Nahe Express	Frankfurt Hbf – Frankfurt Airport Regional – Rüsselsheim – Mainz Hbf – Bad Kreuznach – Saarbrücken Hbf	471, 680	Vlexx	Alstom Coradia LINT
RE 4	Südwest-Express	Karlsruhe – Ludwigshafen – Frankenthal – Worms – Mainz Hbf – Frankfurt	660	DB Regio Mitte	429
RE 5	Rhein-Express	Wesel – Duisburg – Düsseldorf – Cologne – Bonn – Remagen – Andernach – Koblenz	470	National Express	2 × Siemens Desiro HC (462)
RE 6	Pfälzische Maximiliansbahn	Kaiserslautern – Neustadt – Landau – Winden – Wörth – Karlsruhe	676	DB Regio Mitte	1–3 × Siemens Desiro Classic (642)
RE 7	Radexpress Murgtäler	Ludwigshafen – Mannheim – Heidelberg – Bruchsal – Karlsruhe – Rastatt – Gaggenau – Schönmünzach – Freudenstadt Stadt – Freudenstadt	701, 702, 710.8	DB Regio Mitte	Alstom Coradia Continental (1440)
RE 8	Rhein-Erft-Express	Mönchengladbach – Grevenbroich – Cologne – Porz (Rhein) – Bonn-Beuel – Neuwied – Koblenz Stadtmitte – Koblenz	465	DB Regio NRW	2 × Alstom Coradia Continental (1440)
RE 9	Rhein-Sieg-Express	Aachen – Düren – Cologne – Siegburg/Bonn – Au – Betzdorf – Siegen	460	DB Regio NRW	2 × Bombardier Talent 2 (442) Alstom Traxx loco (class 146) + 5–6 double-deck cars (each 4 circuits)

=== Lines 10–19 ===
Line	Service name	Route	KBS	Operator	Usual rolling stock
RB 10	RheingauLinie	Neuwied – Koblenz – St. Goarshausen – Kaub – Rüdesheim – Wiesbaden – Frankfurt	466	VIAS	1–2 × Stadler Flirt (427)
RE 11	DeLux-Express	Luxembourg – Wasserbillig – Igel – Trier – Cochem – Treis-Karden – Koblenz	690, 693	CFL	Stadler KISS
RE 12	Eifel-Mosel-Express	Köln – Euskirchen – Kall – Gerolstein – Bitburg-Erdorf – Trier	474	DB Regio NRW	Alstom Coradia LINT 81 (620) Bombardier Talent (644)
RE 13	Donnersberg Railway	(Frankfurt Hbf – Frankfurt Flughafen Regionalbahnhof – Rüsselsheim –) Mainz Hbf – Alzey – Kirchheimbolanden	471, 680	Vlexx	Alstom Coradia LINT
RE 14	Südwest-Express	Frankfurt – Mainz – Worms – Ludwigshafen Mitte – Mannheim	660	DB Regio Mitte	429
RE 15		Mainz – Bad Kreuznach – Hochspeyer – Kaiserslautern	672, 680	Vlexx	Alstom Coradia LINT 81 (620) Alstom Coradia LINT 54 (622)
RE 16	Trier-Lorraine-Express (only Sat, Sun and public holidays)	Trier – Perl – Thionville – Metz	692	TER Lorraine	Alstom Coradia A TER (X 73900)
RE 17		Koblenz – Boppard – Bingen – Bad Kreuznach – Bad Münster am Stein – Kaiserslautern	471, 672	Vlexx	Alstom Coradia LINT 81 (620) Alstom Coradia LINT 54 (622)

=== Lines 20–29 ===
Line	Service name	Route	KBS	Operator	Usual rolling stock
RE 21	Rheintal-Express (only May–October, only Sat, Sun and public holidays, once a day in each direction)	Koblenz – Bingen – Bad Kreuznach – Neustadt – Landau – Wörth – Karlsruhe	471, 672, 670, 676	DB Regio Mitte	class 628
RE 22; RB 22	Eifel-Express	Cologne – Euskirchen – Kall – Gerolstein – Bitburg-Erdorf – Trier; Runs from Cologne to Gerolstein as RE22, then to Trier RB22	474	DB Regio NRW	Alstom Coradia LINT 81 (620) Alstom Coradia LINT 54 (622)
RB 23	Lahn-Eifel-Bahn	Mayen – Andernach – Koblenz – Bad Ems – Nassau – Limburg	478, 470, 625	DB Regio Mitte	Bombardier Talent (643) Alstom Coradia LINT 27 (640) Alstom Coradia LINT 41 (648)
RB 24	Eifel-Bahn	Cologne – Euskirchen – Kall – Gerolstein	474	DB Regio NRW	Alstom Coradia LINT 81 (620) Alstom Coradia LINT 54 (622)
RE 25	Lahntal-Express	Gießen – Wetzlar – Weilburg – Limburg an der Lahn – Koblenz Hbf (– Andernach – Mayen)	625	DB Regio Mitte	LINT, TALENT
RB 26	MittelrheinBahn	Cologne – Bonn – Remagen – Andernach – Koblenz – Bingen – Mainz Hbf	470, 471	trans regio	1–2 × 460
RB 27	Rhein-Erft-Bahn	Mönchengladbach – Cologne – Cologne/Bonn Airport – Bonn-Beuel – Linz – Neuwied – Koblenz Stadtmitte – Koblenz	465	DB Regio NRW	1–2 × class 425
RB 29	Unterwesterwaldbahn	Limburg an der Lahn – Elz Süd – Montabaur – Siershahn	629	HLB	LINT 27/41, GTW 2/6

=== Lines 30–39 ===
Line	Service name	Route	KBS	Operator	Usual rolling stock
RB 30	Rhein-Ahr-Bahn	Bonn – Remagen – Bad Neuenahr – Ahrweiler – Dernau – Ahrbrück	470, 477	DB Regio NRW	Alstom Coradia LINT 81 (620) Alstom Coradia LINT 54 (622)
RB 31	Donnersbergbahn	(Frankfurt Hbf – Frankfurt Airport Regional – Rüsselsheim –) Mainz Hbf – Alzey – Kirchheimbolanden	680	Vlexx	Alstom Coradia LINT 81 (620) Alstom Coradia LINT 54 (622)
RB 32	Ahrtalbahn	Ahrbrück – Dernau – Ahrweiler – Bad Neuenahr – Remagen – Andernach – Koblenz Hbf – Boppard Hbf	477	Trans Regio	Siemens Mireo (463)
RB 33	Nahetalbahn	Mainz – Bad Kreuznach – Kirn – Idar-Oberstein (– Neubrücke)	680	Vlexx	Alstom Coradia LINT 81 (620) Alstom Coradia LINT 54 (622)
RB 34	Nahetalbahn	Kirn – Idar-Oberstein – Heimbach – Baumholder	680	Vlexx	Alstom Coradia LINT 81 (620) Alstom Coradia LINT 54 (622)
RB 35	Rheinhessenbahn	Bingen Stadt – Sprendlingen – Alzey – Monsheim – Worms	662	DB Regio Mitte	Alstom Coradia LINT 54 (622) Alstom Coradia LINT 41 (623)
RB 35	Rheinhessenbahn	Bingen Stadt – Sprendlingen – Alzey – Monsheim – Worms	662	Vlexx (single runs)	Alstom Coradia LINT 81 (620) Alstom Coradia LINT 54 (622)
RB 37	Hunsrückbahn	Boppard – Buchholz – Emmelshausen	479	Transdev SE & Co. KG	Stadler Regio-Shuttle RS1 (650)
RB 38	Lahn-Eifel-Bahn	Kaisersesch – Mayen – Mendig – Andernach	478	DB Regio Mitte	Alstom Coradia LINT 41 (648)

=== Lines 40–49 ===
Line	Service name	Route	KBS	Operator	Usual rolling stock
RB 45	Pfälzische Nordbahn	Neustadt – Bad Dürkheim – Freinsheim – Grünstadt – Monsheim	667	DB Regio Mitte	Alstom Coradia LINT 54 (622) Alstom Coradia LINT 41 (623)
RB 46	Eistalbahn	Frankenthal – Freinsheim – Grünstadt – Ramsen – Eiswoog	666	DB Regio Mitte	Alstom Coradia LINT 54 (622) Alstom Coradia LINT 41 (623)
RB 48	Zellertalbahn (only May–October)	Kaiserslautern – Hochspeyer – Enkenbach – Göllheim-Dreisen – Marnheim – Monsheim	662.1	DB Regio Mitte	Bombardier Talent (643)

=== Lines 50–59 ===
Line	Service name	Route	KBS	Operator	Usual rolling stock
RB 51		Neustadt – Landau – Winden – Wörth – Karlsruhe	676	DB Regio Mitte	Siemens Desiro Classic (642) Bombardier Talent (643) Class 628 (some)
RB 52		Wörth – Hagenbach – Berg – Lauterbourg	677.1	DB Regio Mitte	Bombardier Talent (643) Class 628 (some)
RB 53		Neustadt – Landau – Winden – Wissembourg	679	DB Regio Mitte	Bombardier Talent (643)
RB 54	Kurbadlinie	Winden – Bad Bergzabern	678	DB Regio Mitte	Bombardier Talent (643)
RB 55	Queichtalbahn	Pirmasens – Hinterweidenthal – Annweiler am Trifels – Landau	675	DB Regio Mitte	Siemens Desiro Classic (642)
RB 56	Wieslauterbahn (only May–October, only Sat, Sun, public holidays)	Hinterweidenthal Ost – Hinterweidenthal Ort – Dahn – Bundenthal-Rumbach	675.1	DB Regio Mitte	Siemens Desiro Classic (642) Bombardier Talent (643)

=== Lines 60–69 ===
Line	Service name	Route	KBS	Operator	Usual rolling stock
RB 62	Riedbahn	Worms – Hofheim – Biblis	655	DB Regio Mitte	Alstom Coradia LINT 54 (622) class 425 (some)
RB 63	Nibelungenbahn	Worms – Bürstadt – Lorsch – Bensheim	653	DB Regio Mitte	Alstom Coradia LINT 54 (622) Alstom Coradia LINT 41 (623)
RB 64	Biebermühlbahn	Pirmasens – Waldfischbach – Schopp – Kaiserslautern	672	DB Regio Mitte	Siemens Desiro Classic (642) Bombardier Talent (643)
RB 65	Alsenztalbahn	Kaiserslautern – Enkenbach – Rockenhausen – Alsenz – Bad Münster am Stein – Bad Kreuznach – Langenlonsheim – Bingen	672	DB Regio Mitte	Siemens Desiro Classic (642) Bombardier Talent (643) class 628 (some)
RB 66	Lautertalbahn	Kaiserslautern – Wolfstein – Lauterecken-Grumbach	673	DB Regio Mitte	Bombardier Talent (643)
RB 67	Steinbahn	Kaiserslautern – Landstuhl – Ramstein – Altenglan – Kusel	671	DB Regio Mitte	Bombardier Talent (643) class 628 (some)
RB 68	Schwarzbachtalbahn	Saarbrücken – Zweibrücken – Blieskastel-Lautzkirchen – Pirmasens	674	DB Regio Mitte	Siemens Desiro Classic (642)

=== Lines 70–79 ===
Line	Service name	Route	KBS	Operator	Usual rolling stock
RB 70		Merzig – Dillingen – Saarbrücken – Homburg – Landstuhl – Kaiserslautern	685, 670	DB Regio Mitte	Alstom Coradia Continental (1440)
RB 71	Saartal-Bahn	Trier – Merzig – Dillingen – Saarbrücken – Homburg	685	DB Regio Mitte	Alstom Coradia Continental (1440)
RB 73	Bliestal-Bahn	Saarbrücken – St. Wendel – Türkismühle – Neubrücke	680	Vlexx	Bombardier Talent 3
RB 74		Illingen – Neunkirchen – Homburg (Saarland only)	683	Vlexx	Bombardier Talent 3
RB 75	Rhein-Main-Bahn	Wiesbaden – Mainz – Groß-Gerau – Darmstadt – Dieburg – Aschaffenburg	651	Hessische Landesbahn	Alstom Coradia Continental (1440.1/1440.3)
RB 76		Homburg – Neunkirchen – Wemmetsweiler – Saarbrücken (Saarland only) (Mon-Fri)	681, 683	Vlexx	Bombardier Talent 3
RB 77	Niedtal-Bahn	Dillingen (Saar) – Niedaltdorf	687	DB Regio Mitte	Class 642

=== Lines 80–89 ===
Line	Service name	Route	KBS	Operator	Usual rolling stock
RB 81	Moseltal-Bahn	Koblenz – Treis-Karden – Cochem – Bullay – Wittlich – Trier	690	DB Regio Mitte	Bombardier Talent 2 (442)
RB 82	Elbling-Express	Trier – Wincheringen – Perl	692	DB Regio Mitte	Bombardier Talent 2 (442)
RB 83		Luxembourg – Wasserbillig – Trier – Wittlich (runs only Mon–Sat)	690, 693	CFL, DB Regio Mitte	Stadler KISS
RB 85	Moselweinbahn	Bullay – Reil – Traben-Trarbach	691	Transdev SE & Co. KG	Stadler Regio-Shuttle RS1 (650)

=== Lines 90–99 ===
Line	Service name	Route	KBS	Operator	Usual rolling stock
RB 90	Westerwald-Sieg-Bahn	Siegen – Betzdorf – Au – Altenkirchen – Westerburg – Staffel – Limburg (extra peak train between Betzdorf and Altenkirchen)	460, 461	Hessische Landesbahn	Alstom Coradia LINT 41 (648/1648) some LINT 27s (640) and class 629
RB 93	Rothaarbahn	Betzdorf – Siegen – Erndtebrück – Bad Berleburg	460, 443	Hessische Landesbahn	Alstom Coradia LINT 41 (648/1648) (some LINT 41+LINT27)
RB 96	Hellertalbahn	Betzdorf – Neunkirchen – Burbach – Haiger – Dillenburg	462	Hessische Landesbahn	Alstom Coradia LINT 41 (1648)
RB 97	Daadetalbahn	Betzdorf – Alsdorf – Daaden	463	Westerwaldbahn	1–2× Stadler GTW (646)

=== Other lines ===
Line	Service name	Route	KBS	Operator	Usual rolling stock
EX	Elsass-Express	Mainz – Alzey – Bad Dürkheim – Neustadt – Landau – Winden – Wissembourg	661, 662, 667, 676, 679	Vlexx	Alstom Coradia LINT 81 (620)
WX	Weinstraßen-Express	Koblenz – Bingen – Bad Kreuznach – Neustadt – Landau – Winden – Wissembourg	471, 672, 670, 676, 679	Vlexx	Alstom Coradia LINT 81 (620)

== S-Bahn services ==
=== Stadtbahn Karlsruhe ===
Line	Route	KBS	Frequency	Material	Operator	Image
S 5	Wörth Dorschberg–Bietigheim-BissingenWörth am Rhein – Maxau – Entenfang – Yorckstraße – Marktplatz – Durlacher Tor – Tullastraße / VBK – Durlach – Grötzingen Oberausstraße – Pfinztal – Remchingen – Pforzheim – Mühlacker – Vaihingen an der Enz – Bietigheim-Bissingen	710.5	30 min	NET 2012, GT8-100C/2S, GT8-100D/2S-M	AVG, DB Regio	
S 51	Germersheim–MarktplatzGermersheim – Rheinzabern – Wörth am Rhein – Maxau – Westbahnhof – Hauptbahnhof – Markplatz – Durlacher Tor – Tullastraße / VBK – Durlach – Grötzingen Oberausstraße – Pfinztal – Remchingen – Pforzheim – Mühlacker – Vaihingen an der Enz – Bietigheim-Bissingen	710.5	30 min	NET 2012, GT8-100C/2S, GT8-100D/2S-M	AVG, DB Regio	
S 52	Germersheim–HauptbahnhofGermersheim – Rheinzabern – Wörth am Rhein – Entenfang – Yorckstraße – Markplatz – Hauptbahnhof	710.5	60 mins in the mornings and evenings, working days only, express services	NET 2012, GT8-100C/2S, GT8-100D/2S-M	AVG, DB Regio	

=== Rhine-Main S-Bahn ===
Line	Route	KBS	Frequency	Operator
S8 (Rhine-Main S-Bahn)	Wiesbaden Hbf – Mainz Hbf – Mainz-Bischofsheim – Rüsselsheim – Frankfurt Airport Regional – Frankfurt Stadion – Frankfurt-Niederrad – Frankfurt Hbf (tief) – Offenbach Ost (– Hanau Hbf)	645.8	430	DB Regio

=== Rhine-Neckar S-Bahn ===
Line	Route	KBS	Frequency	Material	Operator	Image
S1	Homburg (Saar) Hauptbahnhof – Bruchmühlbach-Miesau – Hauptstuhl – Landstuhl – Kindsbach – Einsiedlerhof – Vogelweh – Kennelgarten – Kaiserslautern Hauptbahnhof – Hochspeyer – Frankenstein (Pfalz) – Weidenthal – Neidenfels – Lambrecht (Pfalz) – Neustadt (Weinstraße) Hauptbahnhof – Neustadt-Böbig – Haßloch (Pfalz) – Böhl-Iggelheim – Schifferstadt – Limburgerhof (– Ludwigshafen-Rheingönheim – Ludwigshafen-Mundenheim) – Ludwigshafen (Rh) Hauptbahnhof – Ludwigshafen (Rhein) Mitte – Mannheim Hauptbahnhof – Mannheim ARENA/Maimarkt – Mannheim-Seckenheim – Mannheim-Friedrichsfeld Süd – Heidelberg-Pfaffengrund/Wieblingen – Heidelberg Hauptbahnhof – Heidelberg-Weststadt/Südstadt – Heidelberg-Altstadt – Heidelberg-Schlierbach/Ziegelhausen – Heidelberg Orthopädie – Neckargemünd – Neckargemünd Altstadt – Neckarsteinach – Neckarhausen bei Neckarsteinach – Hirschhorn (Neckar) – Eberbach – Lindach – Zwingenberg (Baden) – Neckargerach – Binau – Mosbach-Neckarelz – Mosbach West – Mosbach (Baden) – Neckarburken – Dallau – Auerbach (b Mosbach, Baden) – Oberschefflenz – Eicholzheim – Seckach – Zimmern (b Seckach) – Adelsheim Nord – Osterburken	670 665 705 665.1		DBAG Class 425	DB Regio Mitte	
S2	Kaiserslautern Hauptbahnhof – Hochspeyer – Frankenstein (Pfalz) – Weidenthal – Neidenfels – Lambrecht (Pfalz) – Neustadt (Weinstraße) Hauptbahnhof – Neustadt-Böbig – Haßloch (Pfalz) – Böhl-Iggelheim – Schifferstadt – Limburgerhof – Ludwigshafen-Rheingönheim – Ludwigshafen-Mundenheim – Ludwigshafen (Rh) Hauptbahnhof – Ludwigshafen (Rhein) Mitte – Mannheim Hauptbahnhof – Mannheim ARENA/Maimarkt – Mannheim-Seckenheim – Mannheim-Friedrichsfeld Süd – Heidelberg-Pfaffengrund/Wieblingen – Heidelberg Hauptbahnhof – Heidelberg-Weststadt/Südstadt – Heidelberg-Altstadt – Heidelberg-Schlierbach/Ziegelhausen – Heidelberg Orthopädie – Neckargemünd – Neckargemünd Altstadt – Neckarsteinach – Neckarhausen bei Neckarsteinach – Hirschhorn (Neckar) – Eberbach – Lindach – Zwingenberg (Baden) – Neckargerach – Binau – Mosbach-Neckarelz – Mosbach West – Mosbach (Baden)	670 665 705 665.2		DBAG Class 425	DB Regio Mitte	
S3	Germersheim – Lingenfeld – Heiligenstein (Pfalz) – Berghausen (Pfalz) – Speyer Hauptbahnhof – Speyer Nord-West – Schifferstadt Süd – Schifferstadt – Limburgerhof – Ludwigshafen (Rh) Hauptbahnhof – Ludwigshafen (Rhein) Mitte – Mannheim Hauptbahnhof – Mannheim-Friedrichsfeld Süd – Heidelberg-Pfaffengrund/Wieblingen – Heidelberg Hauptbahnhof – Heidelberg-Kirchheim/Rohrbach – St Ilgen-Sandhausen – Wiesloch-Walldorf – Rot-Malsch – Bad Schönborn-Kronau – Bad Schönborn Süd – Stettfeld-Weiher – Ubstadt-Weiher – Bruchsal – Karlsruhe-Durlach – Karlsruhe Hauptbahnhof	677 670 665 701		DBAG Class 425	DB Regio Mitte	
S33	Germersheim – Germersheim Mitte/Rhein – Rheinsheim – Philippsburg (Baden) – Huttenheim – Graben-Neudorf Nord – Graben-Neudorf – Karlsdorf – Bruchsal Am Mantel – Bruchsal Sportzentrum – Bruchsal	665.33		DBAG Class 425	DB Regio Mitte	
S4	Germersheim – Lingenfeld – Heiligenstein (Pfalz) – Berghausen (Pfalz) – Speyer Hauptbahnhof – Speyer Nord-West – Schifferstadt Süd – Schifferstadt – Limburgerhof – Ludwigshafen-Rheingönheim – Ludwigshafen-Mundenheim – Ludwigshafen (Rh) Hauptbahnhof – Ludwigshafen (Rhein) Mitte – Mannheim Hauptbahnhof – Mannheim ARENA/Maimarkt – Mannheim-Seckenheim – Mannheim-Friedrichsfeld Süd – Heidelberg-Pfaffengrund/Wieblingen – Heidelberg Hauptbahnhof – Heidelberg-Kirchheim/Rohrbach – St Ilgen-Sandhausen – Wiesloch-Walldorf – Rot-Malsch – Bad Schönborn-Kronau – Bad Schönborn Süd – Ubstadt-Weiher – Bruchsal	677 670 665 701		DBAG Class 425	DB Regio Mitte	
S6	Mainz Hauptbahnhof – Mainz Römisches Theater – Mainz-Laubenheim – Bodenheim – Nackenheim – Nierstein – Oppenheim – Dienheim – Guntersblum – Alsheim – Mettenheim – Osthofen – Worms Hauptbahnhof – Bobenheim – Frankenthal Hauptbahnhof – Frankenthal Süd – Ludwigshafen-Oggersheim – Ludwigshafen (Rh) Hauptbahnhof – Ludwigshafen (Rhein) Mitte – Mannheim Hauptbahnhof – Mannheim ARENA/Maimarkt – Mannheim-Seckenheim – Neu-Edingen/Friedrichsfeld – Ladenburg – Heddesheim/Hirschberg – Weinheim-Lützelsachsen – Weinheim (Bergstr) Hauptbahnhof – Hemsbach – Laudenbach (Bergstr) – Heppenheim (Bergstr) – Bensheim	660 665.3–4 650		DBAG Class 425	DB Regio Mitte	
