= Stettfeld-Weiher station =

Railway station in Ubstadt-Weiher, Germany

Stettfeld-Weiher

General information
- Location: Am Katzbach; 76698 Ubstadt-Weiher; Baden-Württemberg; Germany
- Coordinates: 49°11′02″N 8°38′14″E
- System: Hp
- Owner: Deutsche Bahn
- Operator: DB Station&Service
- Lines: Baden-Kurpfalz Railway (KBS 701)
- Platforms: 2 side platforms
- Tracks: 2
- Train operators: S-Bahn RheinNeckar

Construction
- Accessible: yes

Other information
- Station code: 8262
- DS100 code: RSFW
- IBNR: -
- Category: 5
- Fare zone: KVV: 256
- Website: www.bahnhof.de

History
- Opened: 15 December 2019; 6 years ago

Services
Preceding station	Rhine-Neckar S-Bahn	Following station
Future service as of 15 December 2019
Bad Schönborn Süd towards Germersheim	S3	Ubstadt-Weiher towards Karlsruhe Hbf
Bad Schönborn Süd towards Ludwigshafen (Rhein) BASF Nord	S4	Ubstadt-Weiher towards Ludwigshafen (Rhein) Hbf
Location
- Location within Baden-Württemberg Location within Germany Location within Europe

Stettfeld-Weiher station (German: Haltepunkt Stettfeld-Weiher) is a railway station in the municipality of Ubstadt-Weiher, located in the Karlsruhe district in Baden-Württemberg, Germany.
