= Bad Schönborn Süd station =

Railway station in Bad Schönborn, Germany

Bad Schönborn Süd
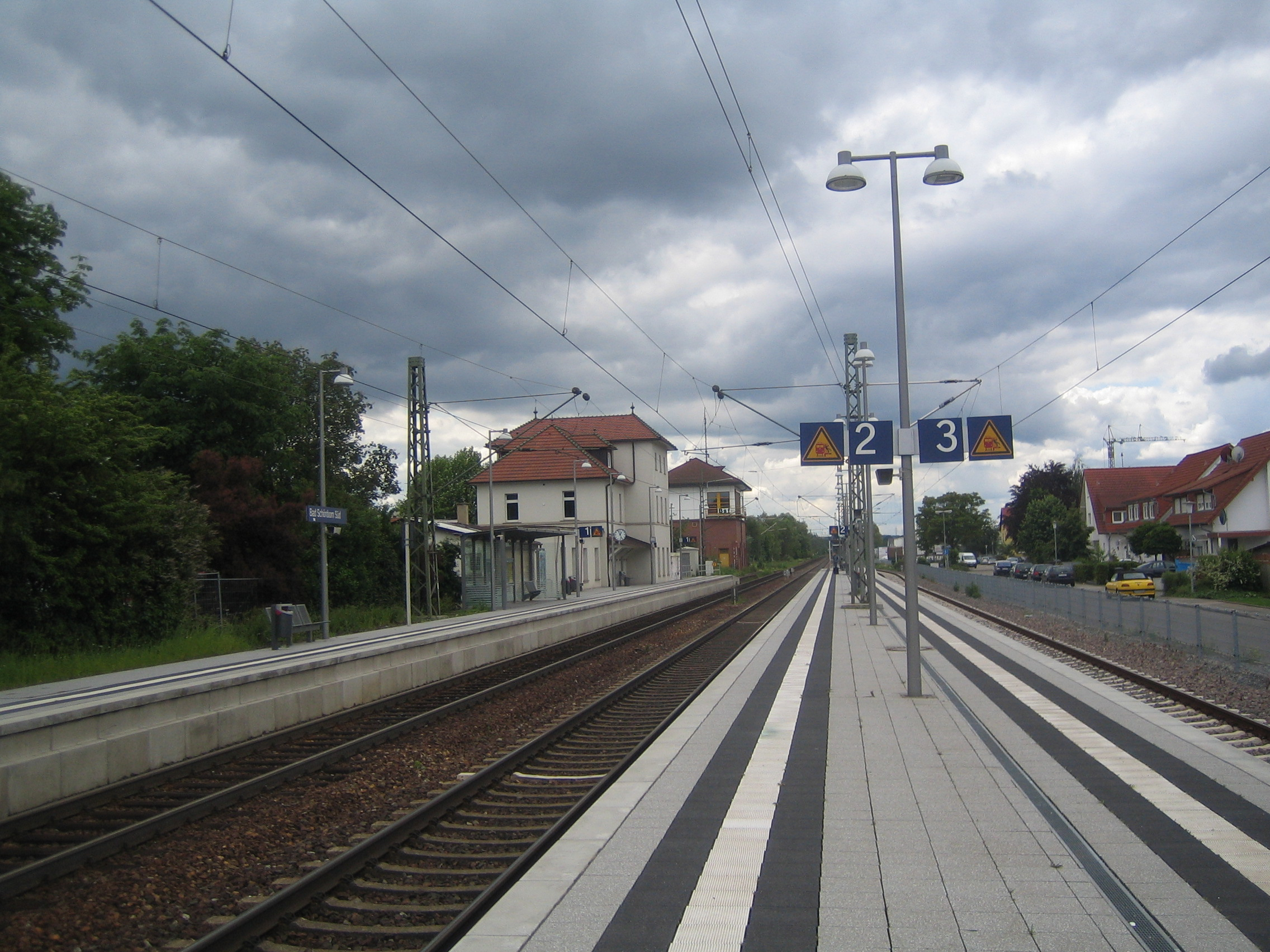

General information
- Location: Römerstr. 33, 76669 Bad Schönborn, Baden-Württemberg; Germany
- Coordinates: 49°12′00″N 8°38′31″E
- Owner: Deutsche Bahn
- Operator: DB Station&Service
- Line: Rhine Valley Railway (km 42.4) (KBS 701)
- Tracks: 3

Construction
- Accessible: Yes

Other information
- Station code: 340
- DS100 code: RBS
- IBNR: 8003533
- Category: 4
- Fare zone: KVV: 256; VRN: 185 and 195
- Website: www.bahnhof.de

History
- Opened: 1843
- Former names: Langenbrücken

Services
Preceding station	Rhine-Neckar S-Bahn	Following station
Bad Schönborn-Kronau towards Germersheim	S3	Ubstadt-Weiher towards Karlsruhe Hbf
Bad Schönborn-Kronau towards Ludwigshafen (Rhein) BASF Nord	S4	Ubstadt-Weiher towards Ludwigshafen (Rhein) Hbf
Location

Bad Schönborn Süd station is the busier of two stations in the town of Bad Schönborn in the German state of Baden-Württemberg. The other is Bad Schönborn-Kronau station. It is located on the Rhine Valley Railway in the district of Bad Langenbrücken. It is classified by Deutsche Bahn (DB) as a category 4 station. It has three platforms and is located in the area of the Karlsruher Verkehrsverbund (Karlsruhe Transport Association, KVV), which manages regional rail services and sets fares. Since December 2003, it has been exclusively served by services on lines S3 and S4 of the Rhine-Neckar S-Bahn.

== History ==
The Heidelberg–Bruchsal–Karlsruhe section of the Rhine Valley Railway was opened by the Grand Duchy of Baden State Railway on 10 April 1843, initially as 5 ft 3 in (1,600 mm) Irish gauge. Langenbrücken station was built at the same time in Langenbrücken. A few years later, the line was doubled.

Since the broad gauge was incompatible with the standard gauge used by its neighbours, Baden soon feared the loss of lucrative through traffic. Therefore, Baden converted its lines to standard gauge in 1854 in just four months.

As on 1 January 1971, as part of the local government reform in Baden-Württemberg, Mingolsheim and Langenbrücken were incorporated in the newly formed municipality of Bad Schönborn and the station was renamed Bad Schönborn Süd.

The platforms were made accessible for the disabled in 2003, following the integration of the Rhine Valley Railway from Mannheim to Karlsruhe in the Rhine-Neckar S-Bahn network. The S-Bahn was opened for services at the 2003/2004 timetable change on 14 December 2003 and the station has been integrated in the S-Bahn network since.

== Infrastructure ==
=== Platforms ===
Bad Schönborn Süd station is one of a few stations on the Rhine Valley Railway between Heidelberg and Bruchsal that has three tracks with a “home” platform next to the station building (platform 1) and an island platform (platforms 2 and 3). Trains towards Heidelberg stop at platform 1 and trains towards Bruchsal/Karlsruhe stop at platform 2. Track 3 is just a siding or used for the overtaking of slower trains.

=== Entrance building ===
In the entrance building of Bad Schoenborn Süd station is the so-called Kunstbahnhof ("Art Station"), occupied by an art school called ART-werk ("ART-works") and the studio of Förderkreises für Kunst und Kirche e. V. (support group for art and church).

== Rail services ==
Bad Schönborn Süd station is only served by S-Bahn services (as of 2014). The station is served hourly by services on S-Bahn lines S3 (Germersheim–Karlsruhe Hbf) and S4 (Germersheim–Bruchsal), resulting in a service every half-hour between Germersheim and Bruchsal.

Rail services in the 2025 timetable
Service	Route	Frequency
S3	Germersheim – Speyer – Schifferstadt – Ludwigshafen (Rhein) – Mannheim – Heidelberg Hbf – Wiesloch-Walldorf – Bad Schönborn Süd – Bruchsal – Karlsruhe Hbf	Hourly
S4	Germersheim – Speyer – Schifferstadt – Ludwigshafen (Rhein) – Mannheim – Heidelberg Hbf – Wiesloch-Walldorf – Bad Schönborn Süd – Bruchsal	Hourly
