= RB 68 =

RB 68 is the designation of several regional rail services in Germany:

- RB 68, operated by Bayerische Regiobahn between Füssen and Munich
- RB 68, operated by DB Regio Mitte between Frankfurt (Main) and Wiesloch-Walldorf
- RB 68, operated by DB Regio Mitte between Saarbrücken and Pirmasens
- RB 68, operated by SWEG Bahn Stuttgart between Hechingen and Sigmaringen
