= Bad Schönborn-Kronau station =

Railway station in Bad Schönborn, Germany

Bad Schönborn-Kronau
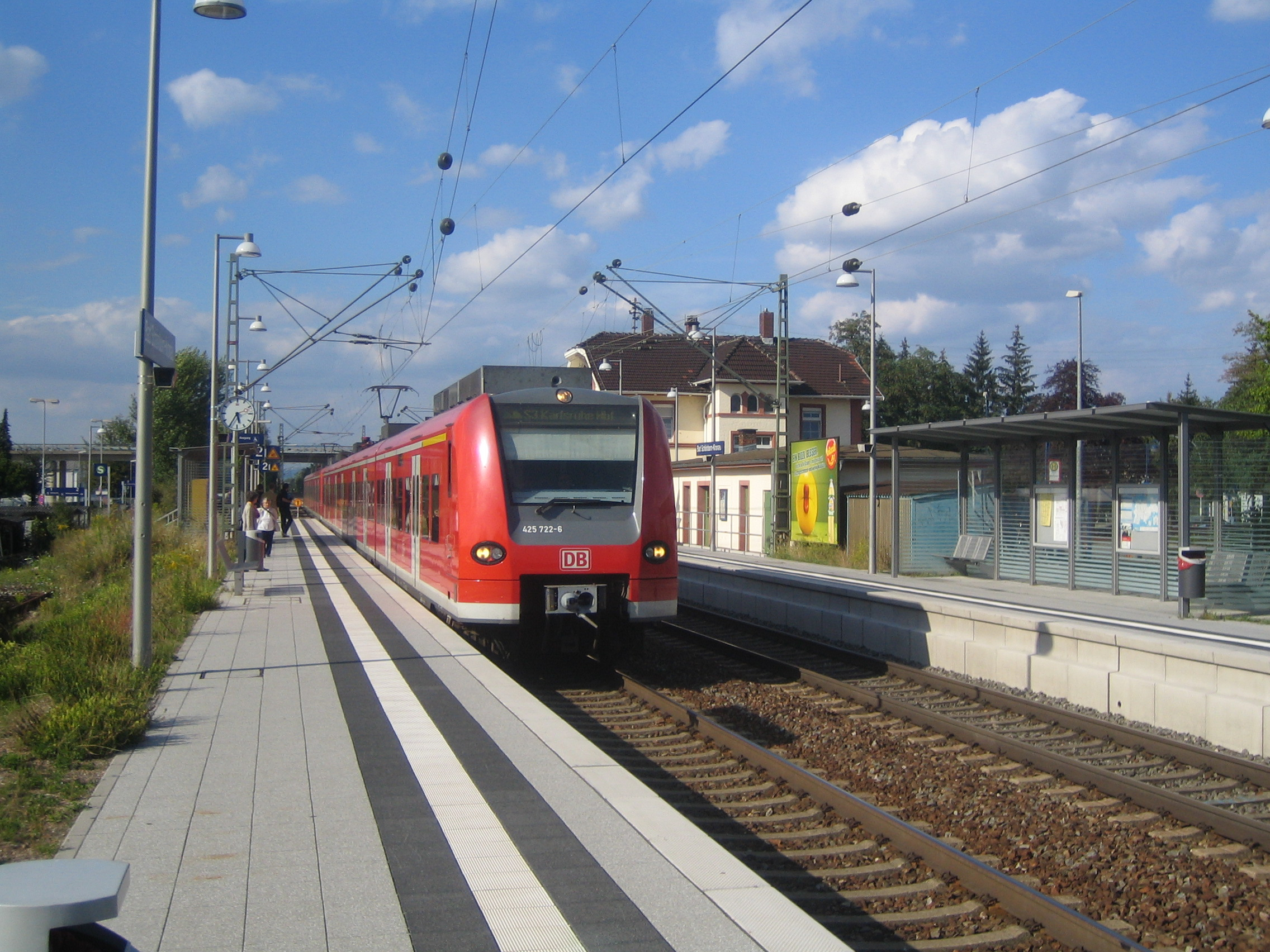
- S3 service of the Rhine-Neckar S-Bahn on the way to Karlsruhe Hbf on platform 2

General information
- Location: Bahnhofstr. 1, 76669 Bad Schönborn, Baden-Württemberg, Germany
- Coordinates: 49°13′10″N 8°38′49″E
- System: Through station
- Owner: Deutsche Bahn
- Operator: DB Netz; DB Station&Service
- Line: Rhine Valley Railway (km 40.1) (KBS 701)
- Tracks: 2

Construction
- Accessible: Yes

Other information
- Station code: 341
- DS100 code: RBSK
- IBNR: 8004032
- Category: 6
- Fare zone: KVV: 256; VRN: 185 and 195
- Website: www.bahnhof.de

History
- Opened: 1875
- Former names: Mingolsheim; Kronau; Mingolsheim-Kronau

Services
Preceding station	DB Regio Mitte	Following station
Bruchsal towards Karlsruhe Hbf	RE 73	Wiesloch-Walldorf towards Heidelberg Hbf
Preceding station	Rhine-Neckar S-Bahn	Following station
Rot-Malsch towards Germersheim	S3	Bad Schönborn Süd towards Karlsruhe Hbf
Rot-Malsch towards Ludwigshafen (Rhein) BASF Nord	S4	Bad Schönborn Süd towards Ludwigshafen (Rhein) Hbf
Location

Bad Schönborn-Kronau station is one of two stations in the town of Bad Schönborn in the German state of Baden-Württemberg, but it is less busy than Bad Schönborn Süd station. It is located between the Bad Schönborn district of Bad Mingolsheim and the municipality of Kronau on the Rhine Valley Railway. It is classified by Deutsche Bahn (DB) as a category 6 station. The station is on the border between the fare zones of the Karlsruher Verkehrsverbund (Karlsruhe Transport Association, KVV) and the Verkehrsverbund Rhein-Neckar (Rhine-Neckar Transport Association, VRN). Since December 2003, it has been almost exclusively served by services on lines S3 and S4 of the Rhine-Neckar S-Bahn.

== History ==
The Heidelberg–Bruchsal–Karlsruhe section of the Rhine Valley Railway was opened by the Grand Duchy of Baden State Railway on 10 April 1843, initially as 5 ft 3 in (1,600 mm) Irish gauge. A station was built at the same time in Langenbrücken, the neighbouring town of Mingolsheim, as Langenbrücken station. It is now called Bad Schönborn Süd station. The line was doubled a few years late.

Since the broad gauge was incompatible with the standard gauge used by its neighbours, Baden soon feared the loss of lucrative through traffic. Therefore, Baden converted its lines to standard gauge in 1854 in just four months.

The municipalities of Mingolsheim and Kronau campaigned for a joint station, but their efforts did not succeed until 1874/1875. The station was opened in 1875 and was named "Mingolsheim". At the initiative of Kronau, the station was given the name of "Kronau" in 1906. The station was renamed as "Mingolsheim-Kronau" in 1920. As on 1 January 1971, as part of the local government reform in Baden-Württemberg, Mingolsheim and Langenbrücken were incorporated in the newly formed municipality of Bad Schönborn and the station was renamed Bad Schönborn-Kronau.

The platforms were made accessible for the disabled in 2003, following the integration of the Rhine Valley Railway from Mannheim to Karlsruhe in the Rhine-Neckar S-Bahn network. The S-Bahn was opened for services at the 2003/2004 timetable change on 14 December 2003 and the station has been integrated in the S-Bahn network since.

The ticket machines were replaced at Bad Schönborn-Kronau station on 2 December 2009. Sunlight was taken into consideration during the assembling of the new machines, so that there are now no reflections on the screens.

== Platforms ==
Bad Schönborn-Kronau station has two platforms, one next to the station building (platform 1) and the other across the tracks. Trains towards Heidelberg stop at platform 1 and trains towards Bruchsal/Karlsruhe stop at platform 2.

The station also has car parking, bicycle parking, a connection to the local bus network and step-free access to the platforms.

== Rail services ==
Only regional and S-Bahn trains stop in Bad Schönborn-Kronau. Currently (2025), the RE 73 stops hourly, connecting the cities of Karlsruhe, Bruchsal and Heidelberg with an express service. At off-peak times, RE trains continue to Mannheim. The station is also integrated into the Rhine-Neckar S-Bahn network. Lines S3 and S4 provide half-hourly connections towards Heidelberg/Mannheim and Bruchsal/Karlsruhe, serving intermediate stops not served by RE trains (except Bruchsal – Karlsruhe-Durlach).

Rail services in 2025 timetable
Train type	Route	Frequency
RE 73	(Mannheim –) Heidelberg – Wiesloch-Walldorf – Bad Schönborn-Kronau – Bruchsal – Karlsruhe	Hourly
S3	Germersheim – Speyer – Schifferstadt – Ludwigshafen (Rhein) – Mannheim – Heidelberg – Wiesloch-Walldorf – Bad Schönborn-Kronau – Bruchsal – Karlsruhe	30/60 mins
S4	Germersheim – Speyer – Schifferstadt – Ludwigshafen (Rhein) – Mannheim – Heidelberg Hbf – Wiesloch-Walldorf – Bad Schönborn-Kronau – Bruchsal	Hourly

== Fares ==
Bad Schönborn-Kronau stations is part of the fare zone of the Karlsruher Verkehrsverbund (Karlsruhe Transport Association, KVV). Since the edge of the Verkehrsverbund Rhein-Neckar (Rhine-Neckar Transport Association, VRN) fare zone runs north of Bad Schönborn, it is in the area of transition between the two transport associations. Therefore, Bad Schönborn-Kronau is the border station between the two transport associations. Depending on the direction of travel, the fare structures of the respective transport network can therefore be used.
