= Philippsburg (Baden) station =

Railway station in Germany

Philippsburg (Baden)
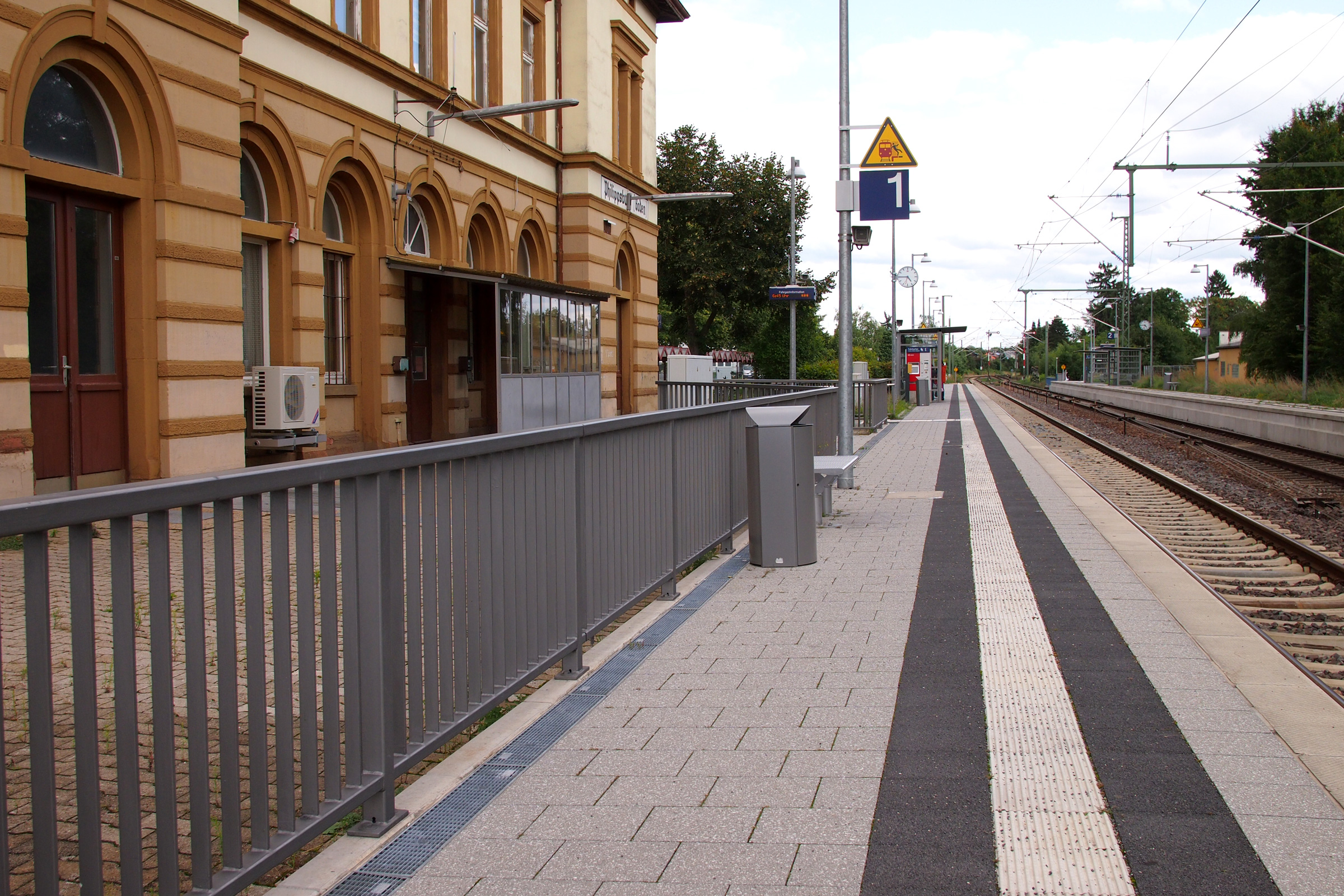

General information
- Location: Bahnhofplatz 1; 76661 Philippsburg; Baden-Württemberg; Germany
- Coordinates: 49.2320°N 8.4535°E
- System: Bf
- Owner: Deutsche Bahn
- Operator: DB Station&Service
- Lines: Bruhrain Railway (KBS 665.33)
- Platforms: 2 side platforms
- Tracks: 2
- Train operators: DB Regio Mitte; S-Bahn RheinNeckar
- Connections: RE 4; S33

Construction
- Parking: yes
- Cycle facilities: yes
- Accessible: yes

Other information
- Station code: 4930
- DS100 code: RPB
- IBNR: 8004813
- Category: 5
- Fare zone: KVV: 253; VRN: 174 (KVV transitional tariff)
- Website: www.bahnhof.de

Services
Preceding station	DB Regio Mitte	Following station
Germersheim towards Frankfurt (Main) Hbf	RE 4	Graben-Neudorf towards Karlsruhe Hbf
Preceding station	Rhine-Neckar S-Bahn	Following station
Rheinsheim towards Germersheim	S33	Huttenheim towards Bruchsal
Location
- Location within Baden-Württemberg Location within Germany Location within Europe

Philippsburg (Baden) station is a railway station in the municipality of Philippsburg, located in the Karlsruhe district in Baden-Württemberg, Germany.
