= Mannheim ARENA/Maimarkt station =

Railway station

Mannheim ARENA/Maimarkt
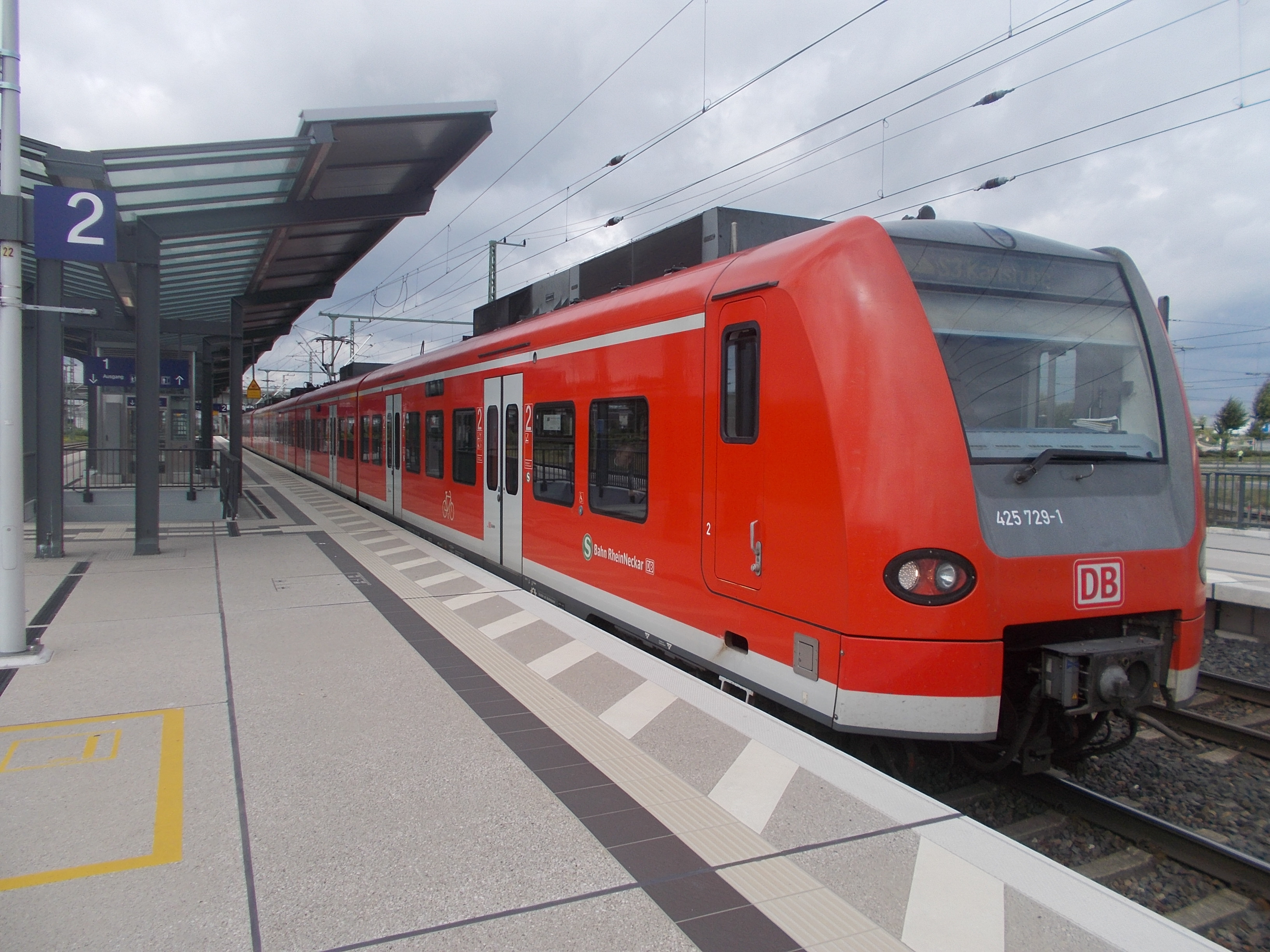
- 2013

General information
- Location: Xaver-Fuhr-Straße/An der Arena; 68163 Mannheim; Baden-Württemberg; Germany
- Coordinates: 49.4600°N 8.5159°E
- System: Hp
- Owner: Deutsche Bahn
- Operator: DB Station&Service
- Lines: Mannheim–Karlsruhe–Basel railway (KBS 665)
- Platforms: 1 island platform 1 side platform
- Tracks: 3
- Train operators: DB Regio Mitte; S-Bahn RheinNeckar
- Connections: 6 6A 6E; 6 45 50

Construction
- Parking: yes
- Cycle facilities: yes
- Accessible: yes

Other information
- Station code: 8155
- DS100 code: RMSM
- IBNR: 8005287
- Category: 4
- Fare zone: VRN: 104
- Website: www.bahnhof.de

Services
| Preceding station | Rhine-Neckar S-Bahn | Following station |
|---|---|---|
| Mannheim Hbf towards Homburg (Saar) Hbf | S1 | Mannheim-Seckenheim towards Osterburken |
| Mannheim Hbf towards Kaiserslautern Hbf | S2 | Mannheim-Seckenheim towards Mosbach (Baden) |
| Mannheim Hbf towards Germersheim | S3 selected trains only | Mannheim-Seckenheim towards Karlsruhe Hbf |
| Mannheim Hbf towards Ludwigshafen (Rhein) BASF Nord | S4 selected trains only | Mannheim-Seckenheim towards Ludwigshafen (Rhein) Hbf |
| Mannheim Hbf towards Mainz Hbf | S6 | Mannheim-Seckenheim towards Bensheim |
Location
- Location within Baden-Württemberg Location within Germany Location within Europe

Mannheim ARENA/Maimarkt station (German: Haltepunkt Mannheim ARENA/Maimarkt) is a railway station in the municipality of Mannheim, located in Baden-Württemberg, Germany.

== Notable places nearby ==
- Maimarktgelände
- Mannheim City Airport
- Mannheim May Market
- SAP Arena
