= Bruchsal Sportzentrum station =

Railway station in Germany

Bruchsal Sportzentrum

General information
- Location: Sportzentrum; 76646 Bruchsal; Baden-Württemberg; Germany
- Coordinates: 49.1355°N 8.59°E
- System: Hp
- Owner: Deutsche Bahn
- Operator: DB Station&Service
- Lines: Bruhrain Railway (KBS 665.33)
- Platforms: 2 side platforms
- Tracks: 2
- Train operators: S-Bahn Rhein-Neckar
- Connections: S33

Construction
- Parking: yes
- Cycle facilities: no
- Accessible: yes

Other information
- Station code: 7751
- DS100 code: RBRP
- IBNR: 8001212
- Category: 6
- Fare zone: KVV: 246
- Website: www.bahnhof.de

Services
Preceding station	Rhine-Neckar S-Bahn	Following station
Bruchsal Am Mantel towards Germersheim	S33	Bruchsal Terminus
Location
- Location within Baden-Württemberg Location within Germany Location within Europe

Bruchsal Sportzentrum station (German: Haltepunkt Bruchsal Sportzentrum) is a railway station in the municipality of Bruchsal, located in the Karlsruhe district in Baden-Württemberg, Germany.
