= Bombardier Talent 2 =

German electric multiple unit trainset

Talent 2
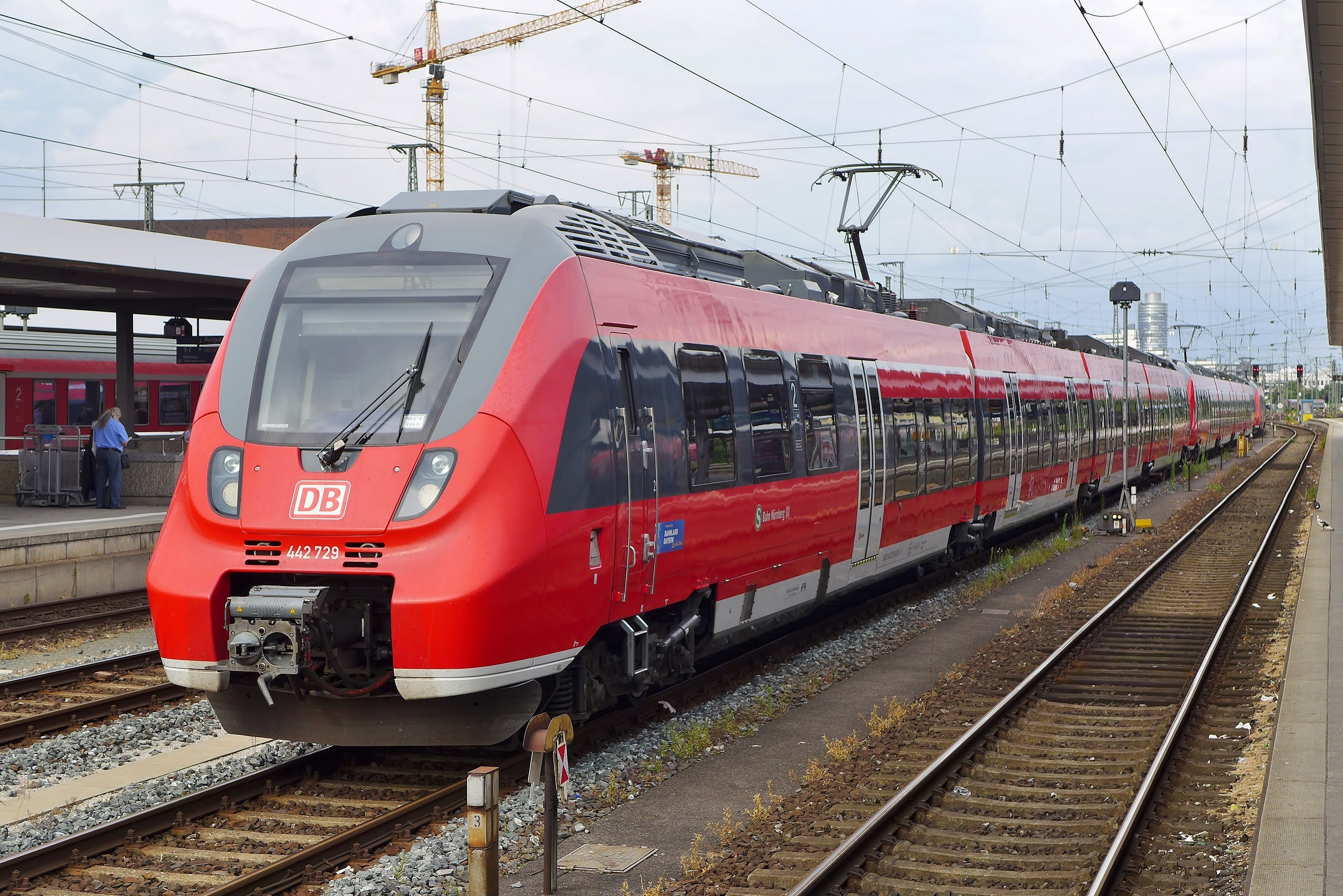
- Talent 2 at Nürnberg Hbf, 2014
- In service: 2011–present
- Manufacturer: Bombardier Transportation
- Predecessor: Talent
- Successor: Talent 3
- Operators: Deutsche Bahn; Abellio; National Express Group

Specifications
- Train length: 40.1–104.5 m (131 ft 6 3/4 in – 342 ft 10 3/16 in)
- Car length: 20.05 m (65 ft 9 3/8 in) (end cars); 16.1 m (52 ft 9 7/8 in) (intermediate cars)
- Width: 2,925 mm (9 ft 7 3/16 in)
- Height: 4.26 m (13 ft 11 11/16 in)
- Wheel diameter: 840–770 mm (33–30 in) (new–worn)
- Wheelbase: 2,300 mm (7 ft 6 9/16 in) (end bogies); 2,800 mm (9 ft 2 1/4 in) (Jacobs-bogies)
- Maximum speed: 160 km/h (99 mph)
- Traction system: Bombardier MITRAC 2-level IGBT–VVVF
- Traction motors: 4–8 × 380 kW (510 hp) 3-phase AC induction motor
- Power output: 1,520–3,040 kW (2,040–4,080 hp)
- Electric system: 15 kV 16 2/3 Hz AC overhead catenary
- Current collection: Pantograph
- Track gauge: 1,435 mm (4 ft 8 1/2 in) standard gauge

The Talent 2 is an electric multiple unit manufactured by Bombardier Transportation. The train began production in 2008 and first entered service with Deutsche Bahn in 2011.

Despite having the same name as the original Talent, designed by Waggonfabrik Talbot and later acquired by Bombardier, for the most part it does not share technical details with that train, except for the rounded sides and doorways. The crash-optimized design of the cab ends have led to the units acquiring the nickname "Hamsterbacke" (Hamster Cheeks). The Talent 3 is the successor of the Talent 2.

== Operations ==
Class	Entry into service	Cars per set	Number	Operator	Image
442.2	November 2011	4	42	Deutsche Bahn; Nuremberg S-Bahn	
442.0	December 2011	2	5	Deutsche Bahn; Mosel	
442.2	December 2011	4	8	Deutsche Bahn; Mosel	
442.1	May 2012	3	26	Deutsche Bahn; Verkehrsverbund Berlin-Brandenburg	
442.3	May 2012	5	22	Deutsche Bahn; Verkehrsverbund Berlin-Brandenburg	
442.1	June 2012	3	3	Deutsche Bahn; Rhein-Sieg-Express	
442.2	June 2012	4	10	Deutsche Bahn; Rhein-Sieg-Express	
442.3	June 2012	5	2	Deutsche Bahn; Rhein-Sieg-Express	
442.1	September 2012	3	5	Deutsche Bahn; Franken-Thüringen-Express	
442.2	September 2012	4	9	Deutsche Bahn; Franken-Thüringen-Express	
442.3	September 2012	5	8	Deutsche Bahn; Franken-Thüringen-Express	
442.1	September 2012	3	4	Deutsche Bahn; Dresden-Leipzig	
442.3	September 2012	5	4	Deutsche Bahn; Dresden-Leipzig	
442.0	December 2012	2	3	Deutsche Bahn; Dresden-Leipzig	
442.2	December 2012	4	3	Deutsche Bahn; Dresden-Leipzig	
442.1	March 2013	3	6	Deutsche Bahn; Mittelhessen-Express	
442.2	March 2013	4	16	Deutsche Bahn; Mittelhessen-Express	
442.1	July 2013	3	8	Deutsche Bahn; Elbe-Elster	
442.0	August 2013	2	3	Deutsche Bahn; Werdenfelsbahn	
2442.2	August 2013	4	34	Deutsche Bahn; Werdenfelsbahn	
1442.1	August 2013	3	36	Deutsche Bahn; S-Bahn Mitteldeutschland	
1442.2	August 2013	4	15	Deutsche Bahn; S-Bahn Mitteldeutschland	
1442.1	September 2013	3	2	Südwestdeutsche Verkehrs-Aktiengesellschaft (SWEG)	
442.3	October 2013	5	23	Deutsche Bahn; Rostock S-Bahn	
1442.1	December 2015	3	19	Deutsche Bahn; S-Bahn Mitteldeutschland	
1442.3	December 2015	5	10	Deutsche Bahn; S-Bahn Mitteldeutschland	
9442.1	December 2015	3	20	Abellio Deutschland; Mitteldeutschland	
9442.3	December 2015	5	15	Abellio Deutschland; Mitteldeutschland	
9442.1	December 2015	3	35	National Express	
9442.3	December 2015	5	5	National Express	
3442.2	December 2017	4	16	Deutsche Bahn; Netz Gäu-Murr	
8442.1	June 2019 - June 2020	3	24	TALENT-3 formerly Abellio Rail Baden-Württemberg, later SWEG, now DB Regio Stuttgart GmbH. Baden-Württemberg	
8442.3	June 2019 - June 2020	5	19	TALENT-3 formerly Abellio Rail Baden-Württemberg, later SWEG, now DB Regio Stuttgart GmbH. Baden-Württemberg	
