= CAF Talent 3 =

Family of railcars

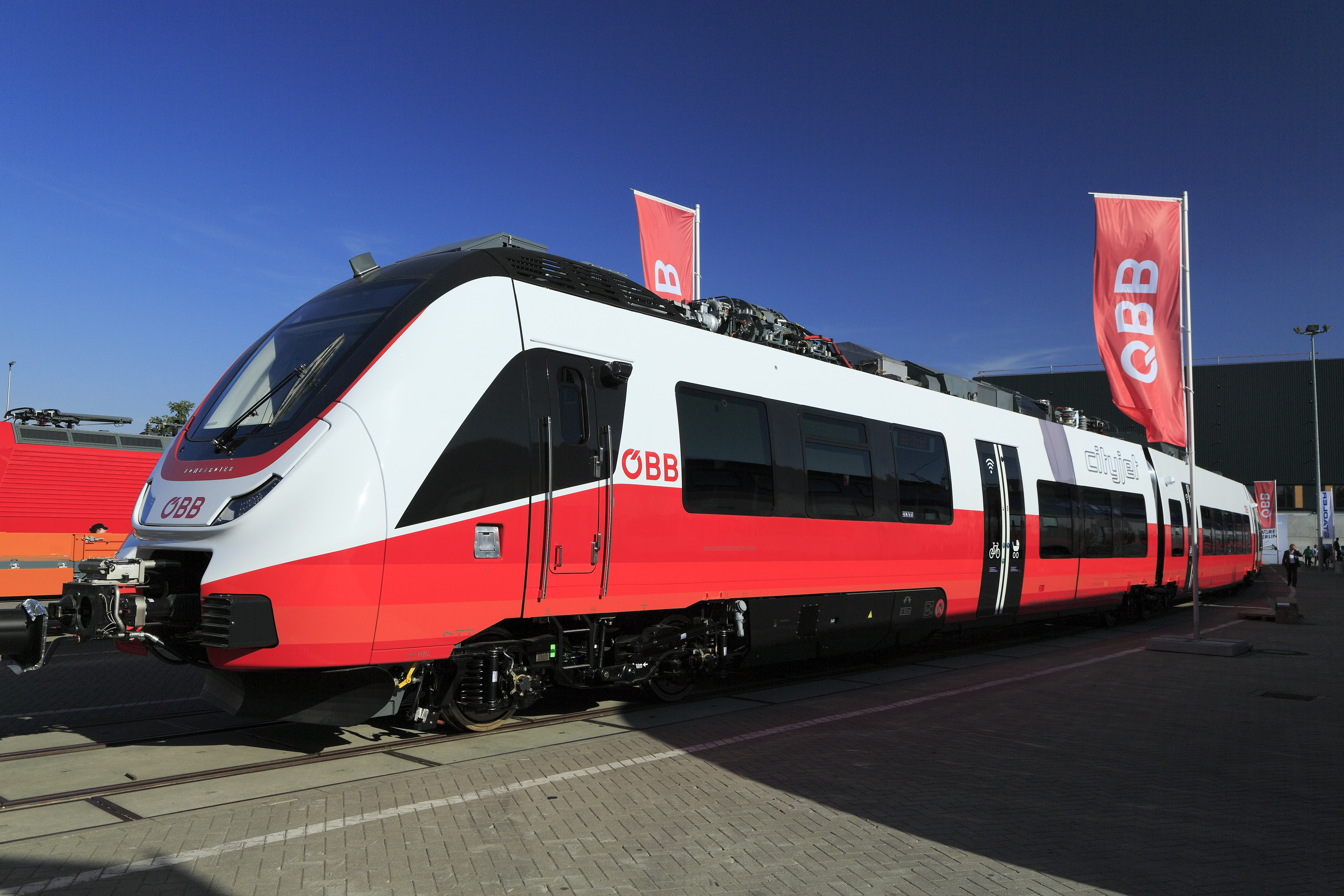
ÖBB Talent 3 at InnoTrans 2018

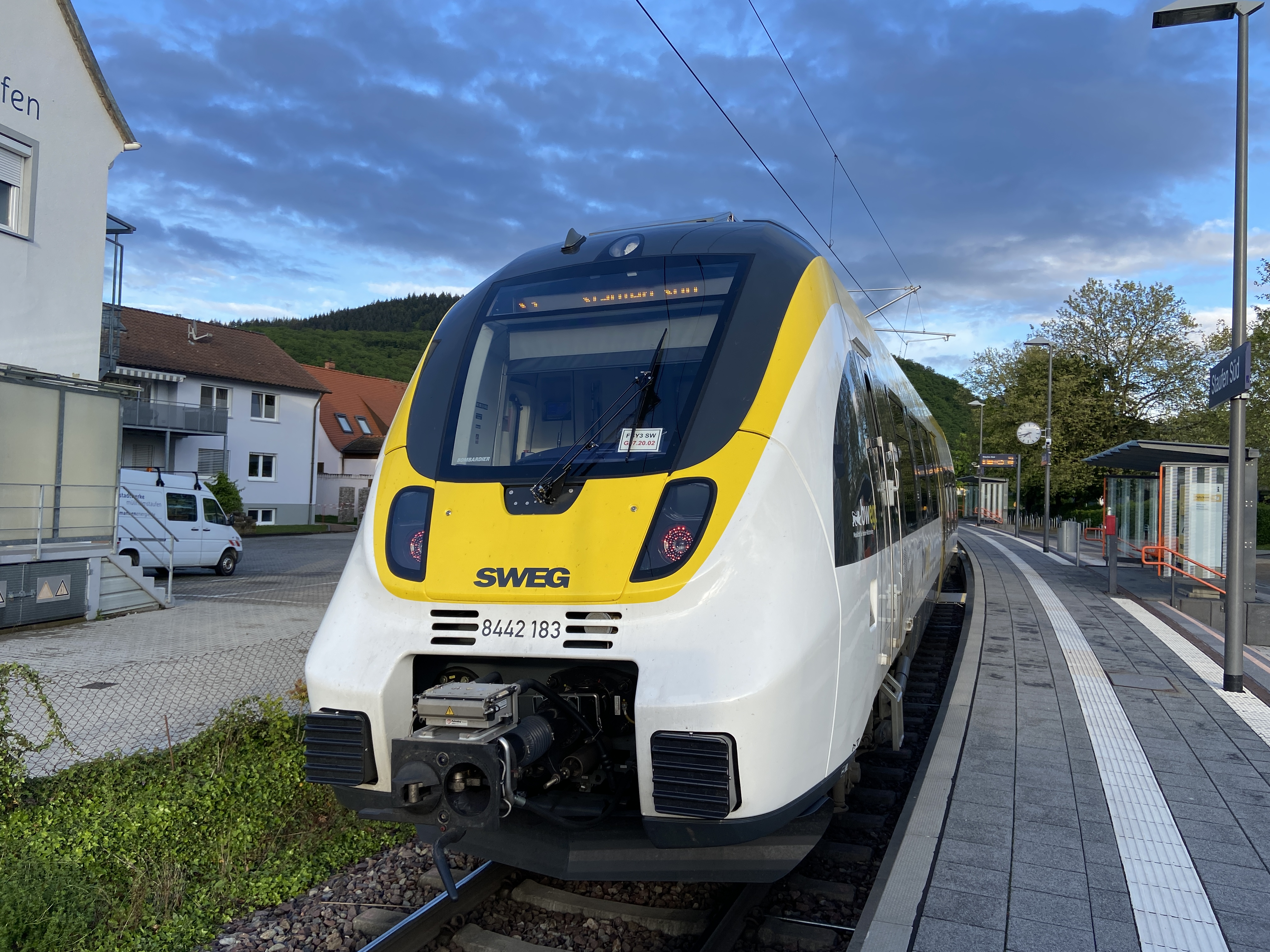
SWEG Talent 3 in May 2021

The CAF Talent 3 is a family of railcars designed by Bombardier Transportation and produced by CAF. The first generation Talent (Talbot leichter Nahverkehrs-Triebwagen) was built in 1996 by Waggonfabrik Talbot in Aachen, Germany. In contrast to the Bombardier Talent 2, the multiple unit is not a new development, but a further development of Talent 2, to which Talent 3 is visually similar. In contrast to the second generation, the Talent 3 complies not only with German but also with European standards.

The first unit was planned to enter service in 2019, but the first runs with passengers did not start until November 2020. In November 2021, Alstom sold the design rights to the Talent 3 to CAF to comply with a European Commission directive when it took over Bombardier.

== Service history ==
Bombardier introduced the Talent 3 at the InnoTrans trade show in September 2016. That month, ÖBB announced a preliminary agreement to purchase up to 300 sets. The agreement was formally signed, along with a firm order for the first 21 sets to be operated from a base in Vorarlberg, in December. In May 2017, ÖBB announced an order for an additional 25 sets for service in Tyrol and cross-border operation to Italy. Construction of the first Talent 3s for ÖBB began in September 17, with deliveries scheduled to begin in April 2019. In ÖBB service, they were to be designated Class 4758. Due to delays and because they did not get a license for the Austrian Rails, the order was cancelled in 2021.

In March 2017, German operator Vlexx ordered 21 Talent 3 sets for operation in the states of Saarland and Rhineland-Palatinate, supposed to begin operation in December 2019. Introduction of the units started to in March 2020.

== Design ==
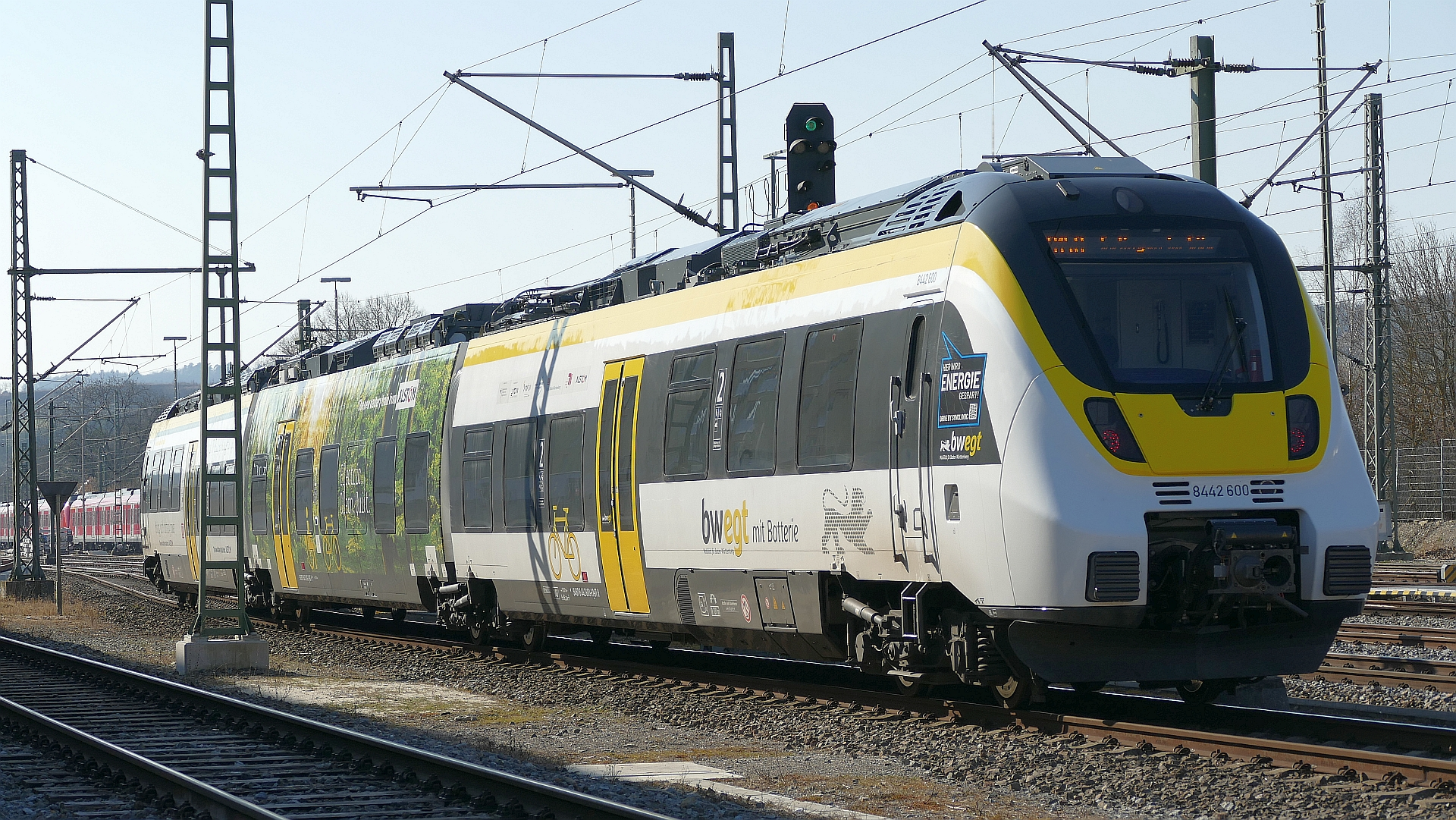
A Talent 3 battery multiple unit near Herrenberg, Germany

The Talent 3 is based on the earlier Talent and Talent 2 designs, with a wider carbody, larger doors, and a lower floor to increase capacity and improve passenger flow at station stops. Depending on the intended service pattern, the Talent 3 can be specified with either a 160-or-200-kilometre-per-hour (99 or 124 mph) top speed. Talent 3 sets can vary in length based on customer requirements—ÖBB ordered six-car sets with a passenger capacity of 300, while Vlexx ordered three-car sets that carry up to 160 passengers.

In September 2018 a prototype Talent 3 capable of lithium battery operation was unveiled.
