= Ubstadt-Weiher station =

Railway station in Ubstadt-Weiher, Germany

Ubstadt-Weiher
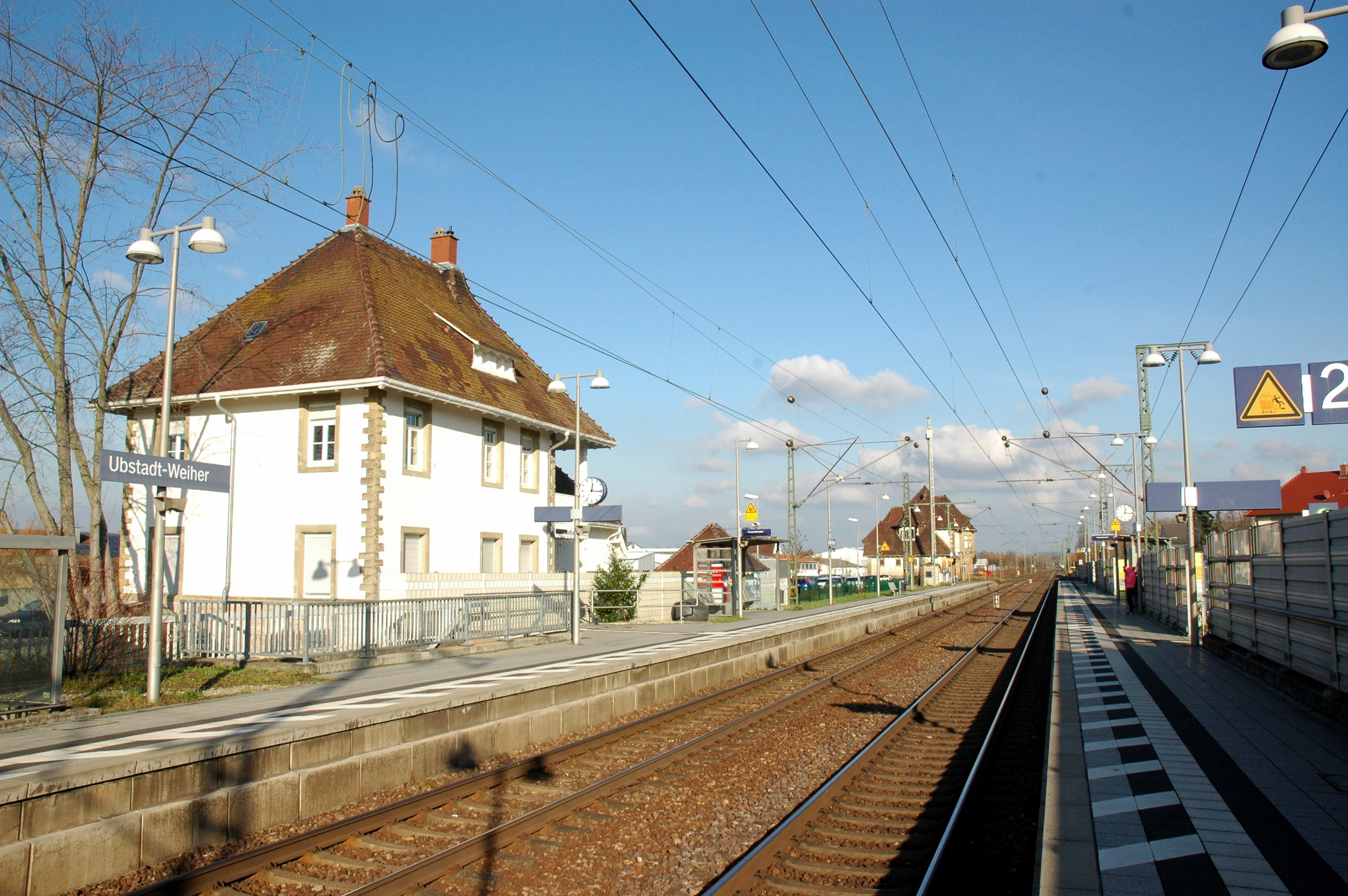
- 2015

General information
- Location: Bahnhofstraße 12; 76698 Ubstadt-Weiher; Baden-Württemberg; Germany
- Coordinates: 49°10′01″N 8°37′25″E
- System: Hp
- Owner: Deutsche Bahn
- Operator: DB Station&Service
- Lines: Baden-Kurpfalz Railway (KBS 701)
- Platforms: 2 side platforms
- Tracks: 2
- Train operators: S-Bahn RheinNeckar
- Connections: S3S4; 131

Construction
- Parking: yes
- Cycle facilities: yes
- Accessible: yes

Other information
- Station code: 6302
- DS100 code: RUW
- IBNR: 8005931
- Category: 6
- Fare zone: KVV: 256
- Website: www.bahnhof.de

Services
Preceding station	Rhine-Neckar S-Bahn	Following station
Bad Schönborn Süd towards Germersheim	S3	Bruchsal towards Karlsruhe Hbf
Bad Schönborn Süd towards Ludwigshafen (Rhein) BASF Nord	S4	Bruchsal towards Ludwigshafen (Rhein) Hbf
Location
- Location within Baden-Württemberg Location within Germany Location within Europe

Ubstadt-Weiher station (German: Haltepunkt Ubstadt-Weiher) is a railway station in the municipality of Ubstadt-Weiher, located in the Karlsruhe district in Baden-Württemberg, Germany.
