= Speyer Hauptbahnhof =

Railway station in Speyer, Germany

Speyer Hbf
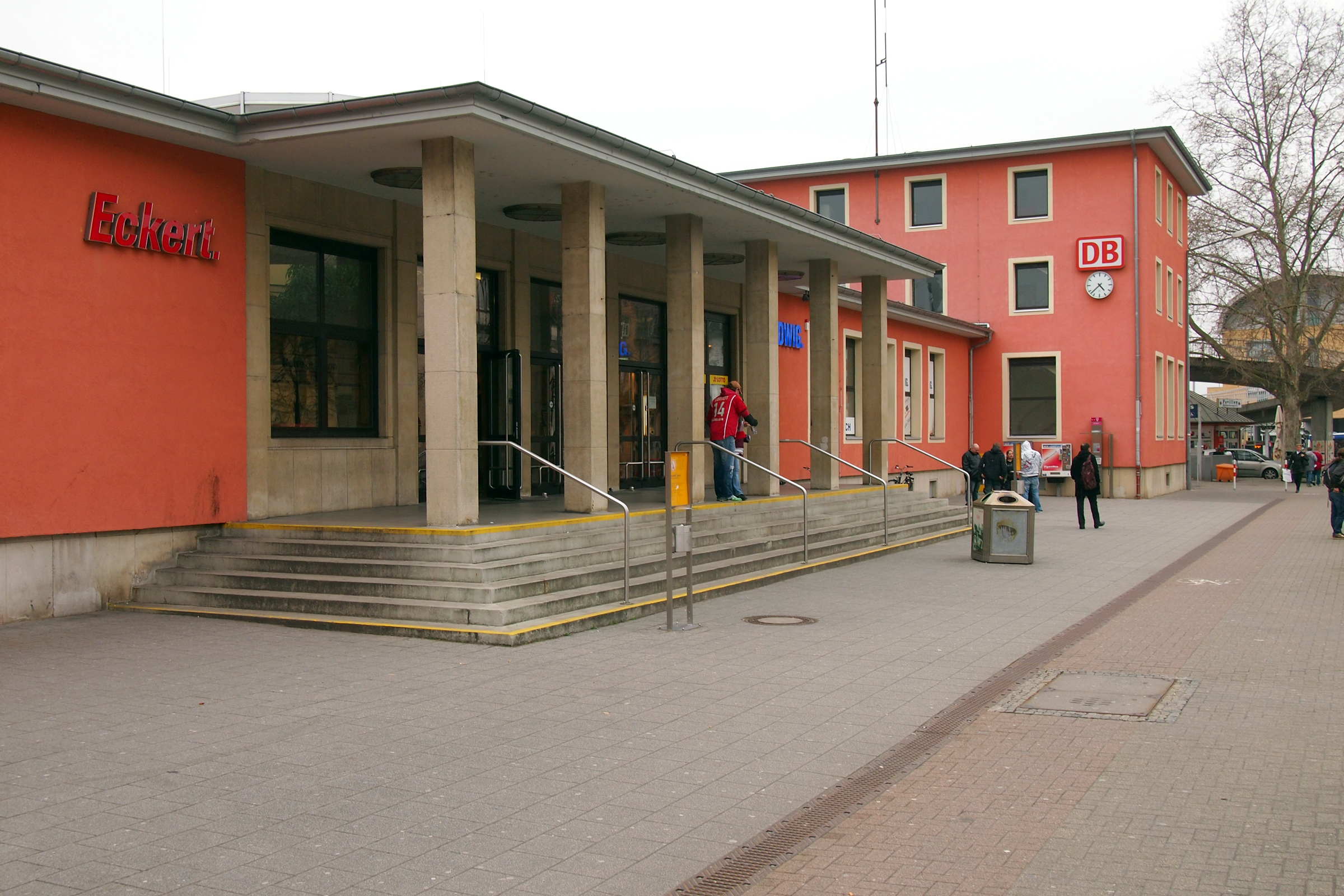

General information
- Location: Bahnhofstr. 43; Speyer, Rhineland-Palatinate; Germany
- Coordinates: 49°19′26.77″N 8°25′41.38″E
- Lines: Schifferstadt–Wörth; Heidelberg–Speyer (closed)
- Platforms: 3

Construction
- Accessible: Yes

Other information
- Station code: 5923
- DS100 code: RSP
- IBNR: 8005628
- Category: 4
- Fare zone: VRN: 143
- Website: www.bahnhof.de

History
- Opened: 11 June 1847

Services
Preceding station	DB Regio Mitte	Following station
Schifferstadt towards Frankfurt (Main) Hbf	RE 4	Germersheim towards Karlsruhe Hbf
Preceding station	Rhine-Neckar S-Bahn	Following station
Berghausen (Pfalz) towards Germersheim	S3	Speyer Nord/West towards Karlsruhe Hbf
Berghausen (Pfalz) towards Ludwigshafen (Rhein) BASF Nord	S4	Speyer Nord/West towards Ludwigshafen (Rhein) Hbf
Location
- Location within Rhineland-Palatinate

Speyer Hauptbahnhof is the more important of the two railway stations in the city of Speyer in the German state of Rhineland-Palatinate.

== Location ==
The station is on the Schifferstadt–Wörth line and is a stop for Regional-Express services from Mainz to Karlsruhe and S-Bahn lines S3 and S4 of the Rhine-Neckar S-Bahn. Public transport in Speyer is organised by the Rhine-Neckar Transport Association (Verkehrsverbund Rhein-Neckar). The station is located about one kilometre from the city centre. The inner city can be reached by buses operated by Busverkehr Rhein-Neckar (BRN) in five minutes. Until 1945, the Heidelberg–Speyer railway also terminated at the station.

== History ==
The station was opened on 11 June 1847 together with the Schifferstadt–Wörth line. On 10 December 1873, it became the terminus of the Heidelberg–Speyer line, which was closed in 1945 after the destruction of the bridge over the Rhine. Between 1905 and 1956 the Neustadt–Speyer Local Railway ran between Speyer and Neustadt an der Weinstrasse.

On 16 December 1944 it was the target of an air attack that destroyed the station building and it was rebuilt in 1953.

== Architecture ==
Today's reception building was built in the 1950s. The old building had to be demolished after its bombing in 1944. Temporary buildings were built, which were then replaced in the style of the time.

The station building was renovated in November 2009 to October 2010. After the renovation energy demand was reduced. This work focused mainly on the roof, facade and windows. In addition, the circulation areas were improved and additional waiting facilities were built. The renovation cost a total of €587,000.

== Lines ==
Line	Route
RE 4	Mainz Hbf – Worms Hbf – Frankenthal Hbf – Ludwigshafen (Rhein) Hbf – Schifferstadt – Speyer Hbf – Germersheim – Graben-Neudorf – Karlsruhe Hbf
S3	Karlsruhe Hbf – Bruchsal – Heidelberg Hbf – Mannheim Hbf – Ludwigshafen (Rhein) Hbf – Schifferstadt – Speyer Hbf – Germersheim
S4	Bruchsal – Heidelberg Hbf – Mannheim Hbf – Ludwigshafen (Rhein) Hbf – Schifferstadt – Speyer Hbf – Germersheim
