= Bruchsal station =

Railway station in Germany

Bruchsal
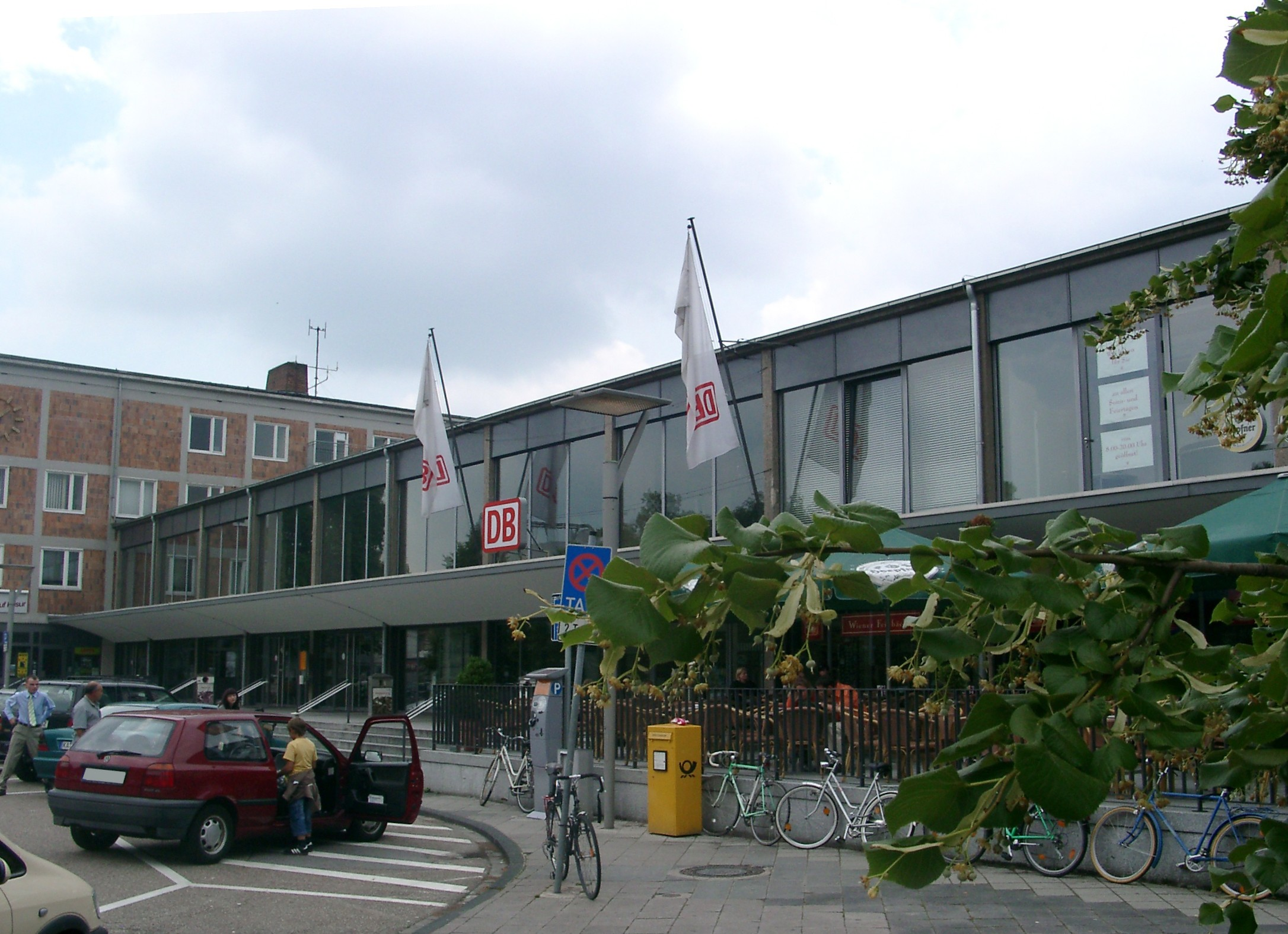

General information
- Location: Bruchsal, Baden-Württemberg; Germany
- Coordinates: 49°7′26″N 8°35′24″E
- Lines: Baden-Kurpfalz Railway; Württemberg Western Railway; Bruhrain Railway; Katzbach Railway; Kraich Valley Railway
- Platforms: 8

Construction
- Accessible: Yes

Other information
- Station code: 904
- DS100 code: RBR
- Category: 2
- Fare zone: KVV: 246
- Website: www.bahnhof.de

Services
Preceding station	DB Fernverkehr	Following station
Karlsruhe Hbf Terminus	ICE 13	Wiesloch-Walldorf towards Berlin Ostbahnhof
Karlsruhe Hbf Terminus	ICE 26	Wiesloch-Walldorf towards Bremen Hbf
Karlsruhe Hbf One-way operation	IC 34	Wiesloch-Walldorf towards Dortmund Hbf
Karlsruhe Hbf towards Karlsruhe Hbf or Basel Bad Bf	ICE 60	Stuttgart Hbf towards München Hbf
Preceding station	(Stuttgart)	Following station
Terminus	RE 17b	Bretten towards Stuttgart Hbf
Terminus	MEX 17c	Bruchsal Tunnelstraße towards Stuttgart Hbf
Bad Schönborn-Kronau towards Heidelberg Hbf	RE 71	Bretten towards Mühlacker
Preceding station	DB Regio Mitte	Following station
Karlsruhe-Durlach towards Karlsruhe Hbf	RE 73	Bad Schönborn-Kronau towards Heidelberg Hbf
Preceding station	Rhine-Neckar S-Bahn	Following station
Ubstadt-Weiher towards Germersheim	S3	Bruchsal-Bildungszentrum towards Karlsruhe Hbf
Ubstadt-Weiher towards Ludwigshafen (Rhein) BASF Nord	S4	Terminus
Bruchsal Sportzentrum towards Germersheim	S33	Terminus
Preceding station	Karlsruhe Stadtbahn	Following station
Bruchsal Gewerbliches Bildungszentrum towards Karlsruhe Hbf	S 31	Bruchsal Schlossgarten towards Odenheim
Bruchsal Gewerbliches Bildungszentrum towards Karlsruhe Hbf	S 32	Bruchsal Schlossgarten towards Menzingen (Baden)
Location

Bruchsal station is the centre of the rail transport in the city of Bruchsal in the German state of Baden-Württemberg.

== History ==
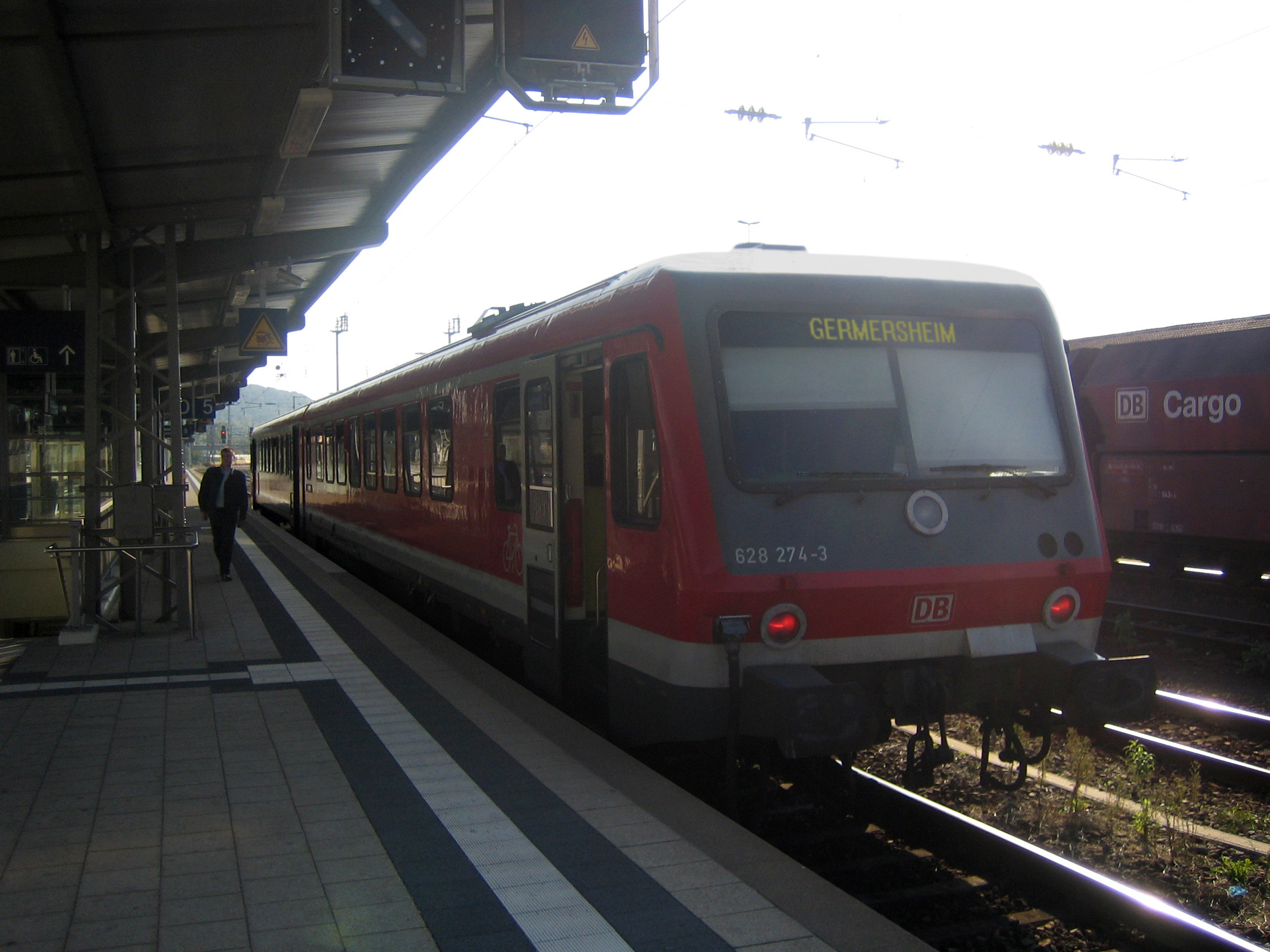
Train of the Bruhrain Railway in Bruchsal

The original station of the baroque town of Bruchsal opened on 10 April 1843 as part of the Karlsruhe–Heidelberg section of the old Baden main line, which eventually connected Mannheim via Heidelberg, Karlsruhe, Baden-Baden and Freiburg to Basel and was initially built with 1600 mm (5 ft 3 in) broad gauge.

A few years later the line was duplicated. The station gained more importance with the opening on 1 October 1853 of the Württemberg Western Railway (Westbahn), which connected Stuttgart and Bruchsal. The Western Railway originally had its own standard gauge Württemberger Bahnhof (station) with two platform tracks, which was located on the eastern side of the original Baden station (Badischen Bahnhof). The locomotive depot and goods yard of the Württemberg railway were built to the south of the station.

Since Baden's broad gauge was not compatible with its neighbours, it became concerned by the loss of lucrative transit traffic. Therefore, in 1854 the Baden lines were converted to 1,435 mm (4 ft 8 1/2 in) standard gauge in just four months, after which the tracks of the two Bruchsal stations could be linked.

When the Bruhrain Railway was opened between Bruchsal and Rheinsheim on 23 November 1874 and extended to Germersheim on 15 May 1877, Bruchsal's development as a rail junction was complete. Long-distance services operated at first in all directions: north–south traffic from Heidelberg via Karlsruhe and Freiburg to Basel and continuing south and east–west, traffic from Munich via Stuttgart, continuing to Saarbrücken via Germersheim, Landau and Zweibrücken. In 1879, the Baden State Railways took over the operation of the Bruchsal–Bretten section of the Western Railway under contract.

=== 20th century ===
On 5 March 1896 a private branch line was opened, starting four and a half km away in Ubstadt and forking into two branches to Menzingen (Kraich Valley Railway) and Odenheim (Katzbach Railway). The latter was extended to Hilsbach on 3 September 1900. The branch line was operated at first by the Baden Local Railway Company (Badischen Lokal Eisenbahn Aktiengesellschaft, BLEAG). In 1932, it was taken over by the German Railway Operating Company (Deutsche Eisenbahn-Betriebsgesellschaft, DEBG), as BLEAG had to file for bankruptcy during the Great Depression.

Between 1890 and 1914, Bruchsal station, which had developed into a hub for rail transport, was extensively renovated. After the construction of a new, prestigious reception building, was completed on 15 May 1900, the old Württemberger station was demolished, unlike the other buildings.

The station was destroyed during the Second World War and a new station was built after the war. As throughout Germany, east–west traffic had reduced significance and long-distance passenger services no longer ran between Bruchsal and Saarbrücken. Only long-distance freight trains still ran on this route.

In the 1950s, the Rhine Valley Railway, the Western Railway and the Bruchsal–Graben-Neudorf section of the Bruhrain Railway was electrified. Traffic on the branch lines to Menzingen and Hilsbach decreased significantly in the postwar period, so that on 1 October 1960 the Tiefenbach–Hilsbach section was shut down for passenger services, due to lack of demand, twelve days after the derailment of a freight train. In 1963 the state-owned Southwest German Transport Company (Südwestdeutsche Verkehrs-Aktiengesellschaft, SWEG) took over the branch lines. At the same time, steam operations were gradually replaced on the line by diesel railcars. On 31 January 1975, the Odenheim Ost–Tiefenbach section was closed and on 1 June 1986 the Odenheim–Odenheim Ost section was closed.

=== Present ===
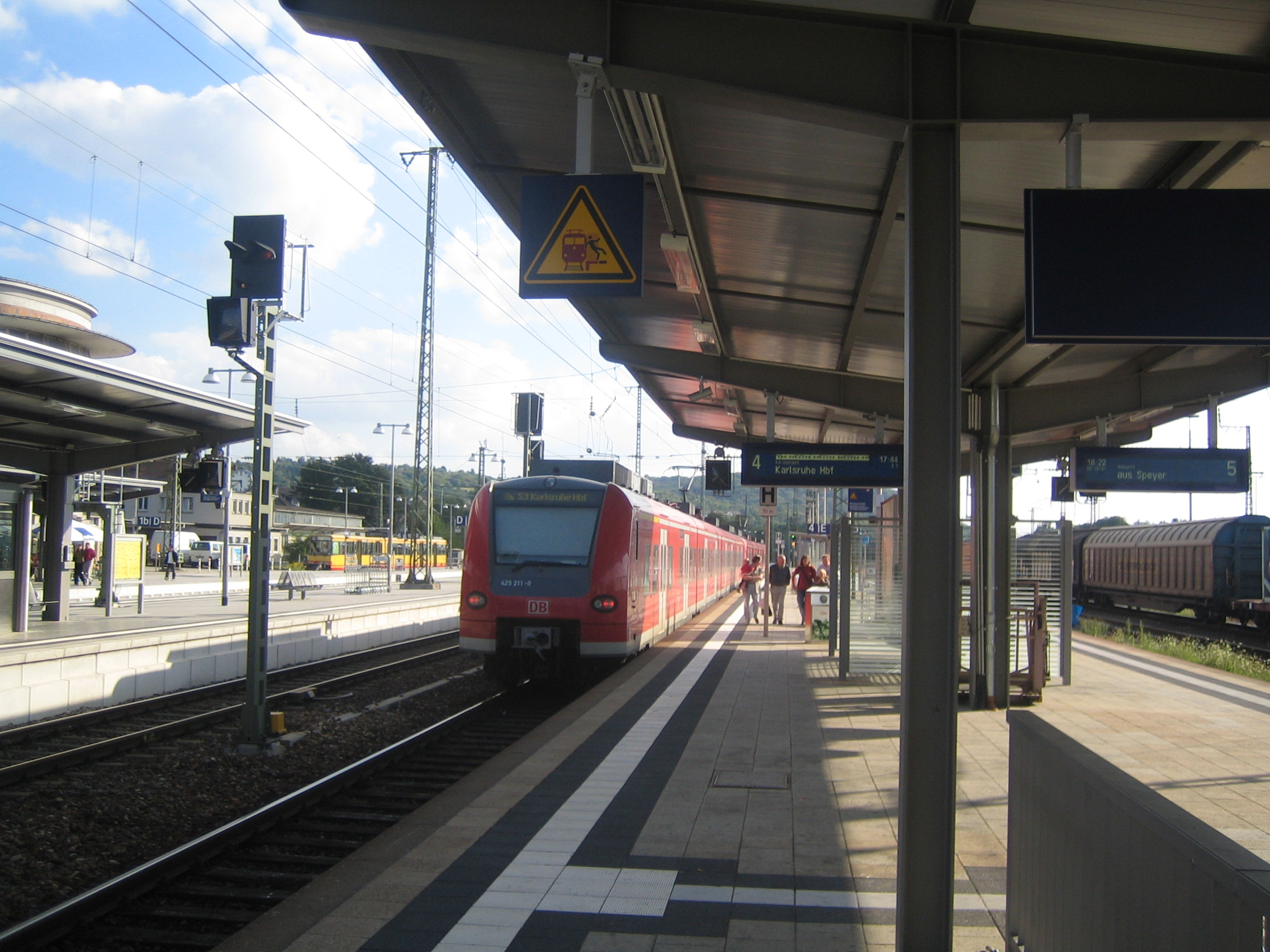
S3 of the Rhine-Neckar S-Bahn in Bruchsal station

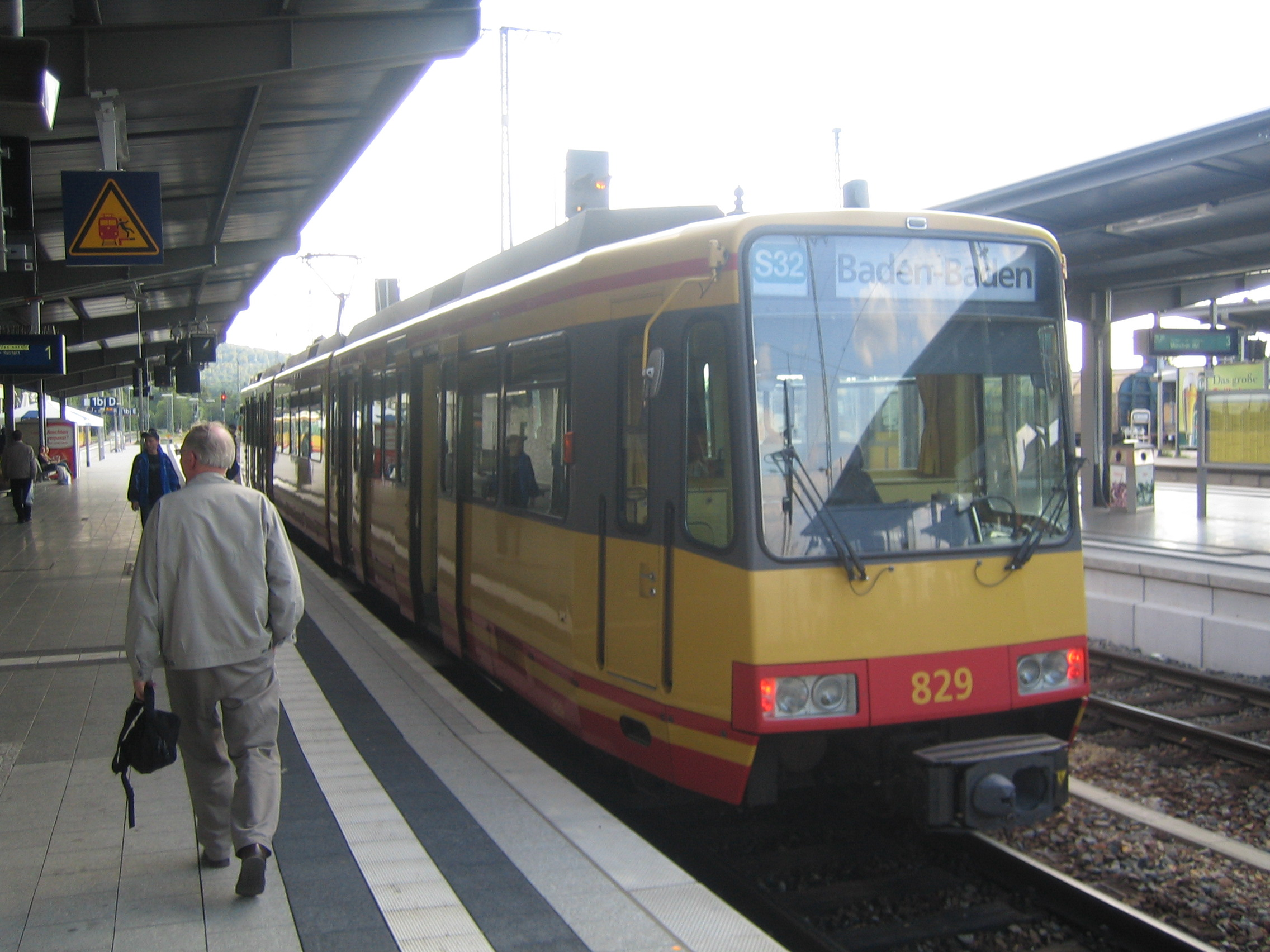
S32 of the Karlsruhe Stadtbahn in Bruchsal station

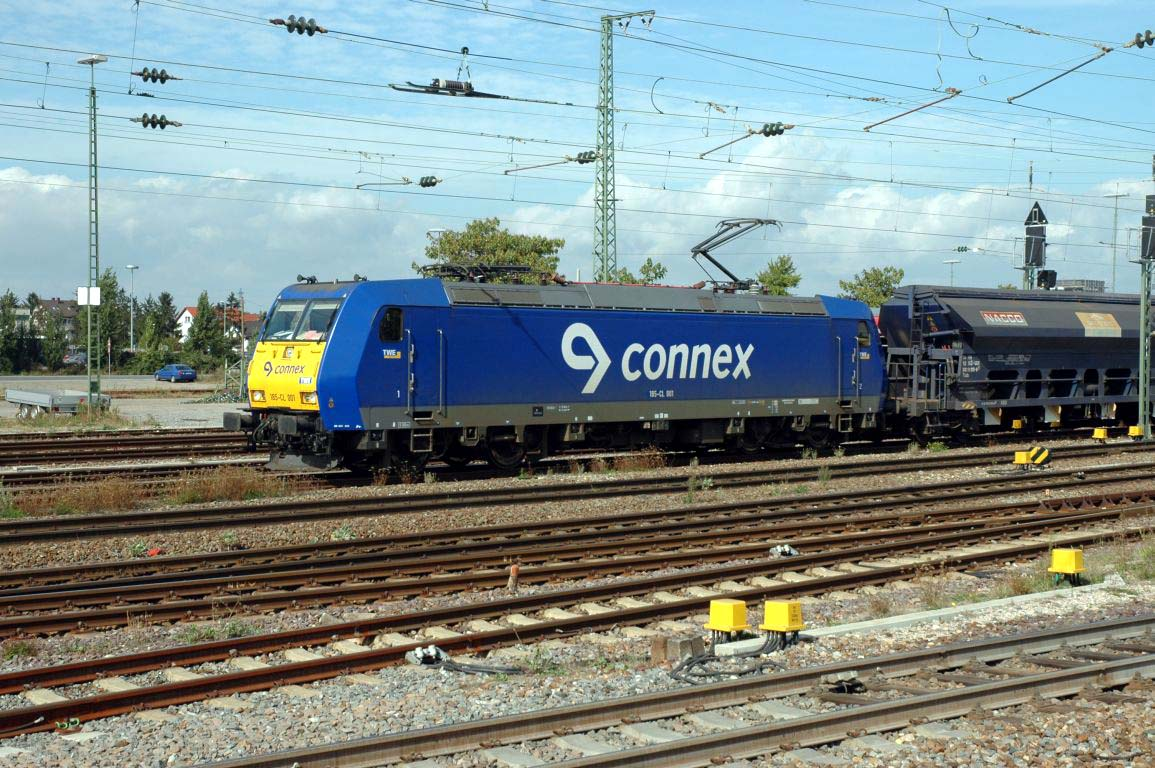
Freight train in Bruchsal station

During the construction of the Mannheim–Stuttgart high-speed railway at the end of the 1980s a connection was built where it ran above the Rhine Valley Railway north of Bruchsal, which allowed long-distance trains to run on the Karlsruhe–Bruchsal–Stuttgart route. Several of the newly created Interregio (IR) services ran on this route from Karlsruhe via Bruchsal, Stuttgart, Aalen and Nuremberg to Dresden; later these services only ran as far as Nuremberg.

As the branch lines to Menzingen and Odenheim were threatened with closure, the Alb Valley Transport Company (Albtal-Verkehrs-Gesellschaft, AVG) announced in 1994 that it would take over the lines from the SWEG and upgrade them for operations as part of the Karlsruhe Stadtbahn. In the same year, Stadtbahn lines S3 (Karlsruhe–Bruchsal) and S9 (Bruchsal–Bretten) were established. In September 1996, the S3 line was extended on the Kraich Valley line to Menzingen. Two years later the Katzbach line was integrated as line S31 of the Stadtbahn network. Both branches of the branch line had been electrified to enable these services. Every day, a service of Intercity-Express route 31 (from Kiel via the Ruhr) stops at the station. Every two hours Intercity services run to Hamburg and Munich.

There are 5 through platform tracks (1–5), three terminating platform tracks (6–8) and three through tracks without platforms for freight trains or storage. Tracks 1–3 have two sections (numbered “a” or “b”) with different platform heights in order to cater for the door level of both Stadtbahn trains and lower trains, such as Deutsche Bahn long-distance services. Track 1b is usually served by Stadtbahn lines S31/S32 mainly to Karlsruhe, but trains to Menzingen and Odenheim also sometimes stop there, but usually stop on track 3. Track 1a is very rarely used. Regional-Express trains to Stuttgart stop at track 2b and Rhine-Neckar S-Bahn S4 trains also stop there during their half hour lay over in Bruchsal. Track 3 is the platform for mainline services to Heidelberg and the Mannheim–Stuttgart high-speed railway. Track 4 is the corresponding platform in the opposite direction towards Karlsruhe. However, Regional-Express services to Heidelberg also stop here, because the track layout does not allow them to use track 3. Track 5 is used only by the hourly S33 service to Germersheim. The south-facing terminal track 6 handles Stadtbahn line S9 to / from Mühlacker and Bretten. Tracks 7 and 8 face the north. Track 7 is used only for Stadtbahn trains to Menzingen and Odenheim. Track 8 is almost exclusively used for train storage.

In the 2026 timetable, the following services stop at the station:

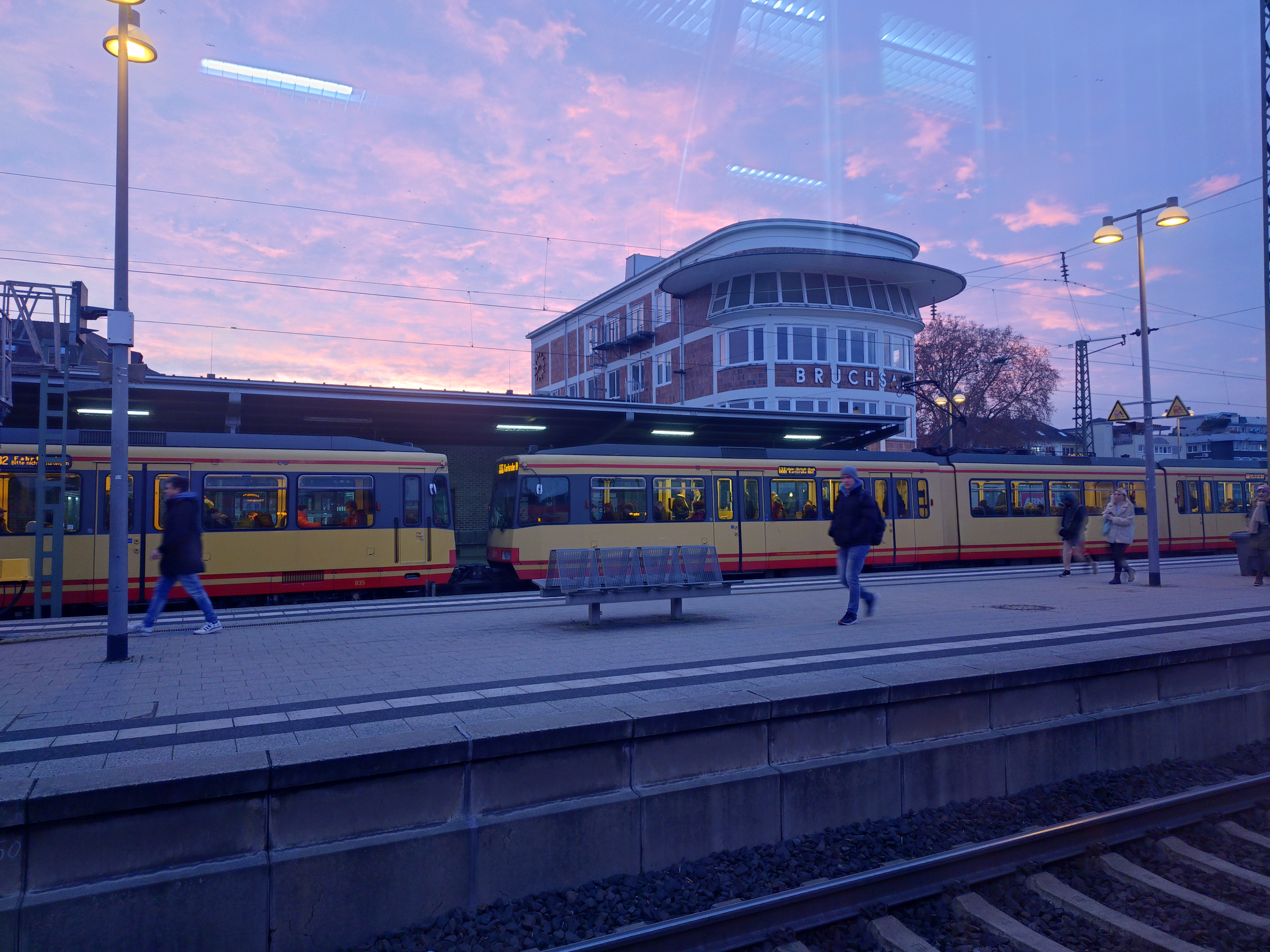
Former Bruchsal Signal Tower (Box)

== Long distance services ==
Line	Route	Frequency
ICE 13	Karlsruhe – Bruchsal – Heidelberg – Darmstadt – Frankfurt South – Kassel – Braunschweig – Wolfsburg – Berlin – Berlin Ostbahnhof	Twice a day
ICE 26	Bremen – Hannover – Kassel-Wilhelmshöhe – Gießen – Frankfurt (Main) – Heidelberg – Bruchsal – Karlsruhe	Every four hours
ICE 42	Dortmund – Cologne – Koblenz – Frankfurt (Main) – Mannheim – Bruchsal – Stuttgart – Ulm – Augsburg – Munich	One service per day
ICE 60	(Basel SBB – Freiburg – Offenburg –) Karlsruhe – Bruchsal – Stuttgart – Augsburg – Munich	Every two hours

== Regional and S-Bahn services ==
Line	Route	Frequency
RE 17b	Heidelberg – Bruchsal – Mühlacker – Vaihingen (Enz) – Bietigheim-Bissingen – Stuttgart	Every 120 mins
RE 73	Heidelberg – Bruchsal – Karlsruhe	Every 60 mins
RB 17c	Bruchsal – Helmsheim – Bretten – Maulbronn West – Mühlacker	Every 60 mins to Stuttgart, every 30 mins to Bretten in peak
S3	Germersheim – Speyer – Ludwigshafen (Rhein) – Mannheim – Heidelberg – Wiesloch-Walldorf – Bruchsal – Karlsruhe	Every 30/60 mins
S 31	(Eutingen (Gäu) –) Freudenstadt – Baiersbronn – Forbach (Schwarzw) – Rastatt – Muggensturm – Karlsruhe – Bruchsal – Odenheim	Every 60 mins, Mon-Fri afternoons coupled with S 32 to Ubstadt Ort every 20 minutes
S 32	Achern – Baden-Baden – Rastatt – Muggensturm – Karlsruhe – Bruchsal – Menzingen (Baden)	Every 60 mins, Mon-Fri afternoons coupled with S 31 to Ubstadt Ort every 20 minutes
S33	Germersheim – Graben-Neudorf – Philippsburg – Bruchsal	Every 60 mins
S4	Germersheim – Speyer – Ludwigshafen (Rhein) – Mannheim – Heidelberg – Wiesloch-Walldorf – Bruchsal	Every 60 mins (morning/evening)
