= Germersheim station =

Junction station

Germersheim
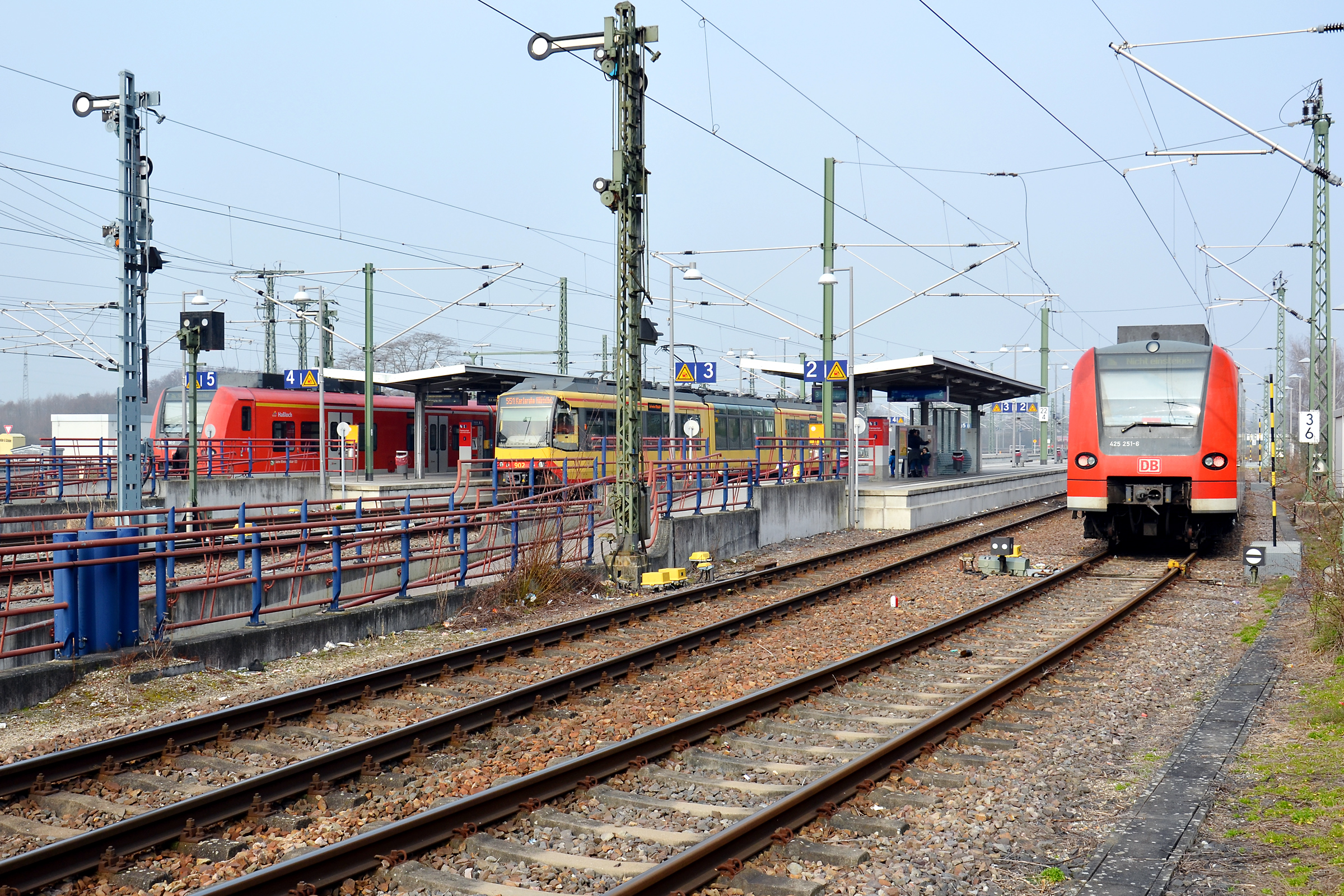
- Germersheim station in 2015

General information
- Location: Bahnhofstr. 13, Germersheim, Rhineland-Palatinate; Germany
- Coordinates: 49°13′33″N 8°21′53″E
- Lines: Schifferstadt–Wörth (22.5 km); Germersheim–Bruchsal (3.5 km); Germersheim–Landau (3.5 km, closed)
- Platforms: 4

Construction
- Accessible: Yes

Other information
- Station code: 2092
- DS100 code: RGE
- IBNR: 8000376
- Category: 5
- Fare zone: KVV: 575; VRN: 183 (KVV transitional tariff)
- Website: www.bahnhof.de

History
- Opened: 14 March 1864

Services
Preceding station	DB Regio Mitte	Following station
Speyer Hbf towards Frankfurt (Main) Hbf	RE 4	Philippsburg (Baden) towards Karlsruhe Hbf
Preceding station	Rhine-Neckar S-Bahn	Following station
Germersheim Süd/Nolte towards Karlsruhe Hbf	S3	Lingenfeld towards Karlsruhe Hbf
Terminus	S4	Lingenfeld towards Ludwigshafen (Rhein) Hbf
Terminus	S33	Germersheim Mitte/Rhein towards Bruchsal
Lingenfeld towards Ludwigshafen (Rhein) BASF Nord	S44 Limited service	Germersheim Mitte/Rhein One-way operation
Preceding station	Karlsruhe Stadtbahn	Following station
Terminus	S 51	Germersheim Mitte/Rhein towards Söllingen or Pforzheim Hbf
Terminus	S 52	Germersheim Mitte/Rhein towards Karlsruhe Marktplatz
Location
- Location within Rhineland-Palatinate Location within Germany Location within Europe

Germersheim station is a junction station in the town of Germersheim in the German state of Rhineland-Palatinate. Deutsche Bahn classifies it as a category 5 station and it has four platform tracks. The station is located in the network of the Karlsruher Verkehrsverbund (Karlsruhe Transport Association, KVV) and belongs to fare zone 575. Since 1996, Germersheim has also been part of the area where the tickets of the Verkehrsverbund Rhein-Neckar (Rhine-Neckar Transport Association, VRN) are accepted at a transitional rate. The address of the station is Bahnhofstraße 13.

The station was opened on 14 March 1864 as the terminus of the first section of the branch line from Schifferstadt to Speyer. On 16 May 1872, it became the eastern terminus of a line from Landau. The line from Schifferstadt was extended to Wörth on 25 July 1876. On 15 May of the following year, the Bruhrain Railway from Bruchsal was extended from Rheinsheim across the Rhine to Germersheim. The line to Landau was gradually phased out in the 1980s. Since 2006 the station has been part of the Rhine-Neckar S-Bahn and since 2010 also part of the Karlsruhe Stadtbahn. The original entrance building is under heritage protection.

== Location ==
The station is located on the northern outskirts of Germersheim. Part of the track layout is in the municipality of Lingenfeld. District road 31 runs to Lingenfeld to the west and parallel to the tracks and the street of Am Alten Bahnhof runs to the east.

=== Railway lines ===
The Schifferstadt–Wörth railway comes from the north-north-west. South of the station, it takes a large arc around the town. The Bruhrain Railway (Bruhrainbahn) follows it first to the south, then runs on a higher embankment and runs over an approximately semicircular course to cross the state border between Baden-Württemberg and Rhineland-Palatinate in the form of Rhine. The now disused route to Landau followed the route to Schifferstadt to the north and branched off to the west just before Lingenfeld station, passing through the built-up area of Lingenfeld municipality.

== History ==
=== Railway initiatives around Germersheim and opening ===
Originally the administration of the Circle of the Rhine (Rheinkreis), which was part of Bavaria, planned that its first railway line would be first in the north–south direction from Rheinschanze via Lauterbourg to Strasbourg, which would compete with the Mannheim–Basel railway proposed by Baden. However, instead it was decided to build the Palatine Ludwig Railway (Pfälzische Ludwigsbahn, Ludwigshafen–Bexbach), which was opened in the period from 1847 to 1849. In the meantime, discussions took place as to whether a line from Neustadt via Landau to Wissembourg or a line along the Rhine via Speyer, Germersheim and Wörth was more urgent and desirable. The facilities required for a station for Germersheim was also the subject of the debate. Since the military preferred a route on the edge of the Palatinate Forest (Pfälzerwald), this was built in the form of the Maximilian Railway between Neustadt and Wissembourg.

Subsequently, a branch of this line was planned, which was primarily intended for the transport of coal to neighbouring Baden. In this context, the town of Germersheim advocated a railway line from Landau through its territory to Bruchsal. These efforts were in competition with the planned Winden–Karlsruhe railway. For this reason, Germersheim mobilised to prevent the latter project going ahead and even sent a deputation to the German Confederation in Frankfurt. The Palatinate administration turned down the Germersheim approach, so the line from Winden to Karlsruhe was built starting in 1862.

Instead, it was decided to extend the Schifferstadt–Speyer railway, which opened in 1847 with the Ludwig Railway, to Germersheim. This line was opened on 14 March 1864. The old entrance building was built at this time. Due to the fact that Germersheim was a fortified town, the station had to be built as a lightweight construction on trusses.

=== Development to the railway junction ===
In the following years there were new plans to connect the two fortified towns of Landau and Germersheim. The railway was put into operation on 16 May 1872, after extended discussion of the route, with its station in Germersheim originally built as a terminal station. Even before the connection of Germersheim to the railway network from Schifferstadt, there were proposals to build a line in the long-term to Wörth. Two plans were developed: one of them suggested that the line would bypass the town of Germersheim to the west, and the other recommended a bypass to the east of the town. Due to the simultaneous planning of the Bruhrain Railway between Bruchsal and Germersheim, the decision was finally made in favour of a bypass to the east. The extension of the line to Wörth was opened on 25 July 1876.

On 15 May of the following year, the gap was closed to the Bruhrain Railway, which had ended in Rheinsheim since 1874. This had been delayed for a few years, as the military authorities insisted that the bridge should be located so as not to obstruct the firing range of the fortress of Germersheim (Festung Germersheim). In this way a continuous east–west connection was established through the station, which was used a decade later by long-distance services. Germersheim itself became an important railway junction in the Palatinate.

The station became part of the area of the Reichsbahndirektion (Reichsbahn railway division) of Ludwigshafen after the founding of the Deutsche Reichsbahn in 1922. During the dissolution of the railway division of Ludwigshafen, responsibility for it was transferred to the railway division of Mainz on 1 May 1936. During this time, it was also a locomotive depot, which was a sub-depot of the Landau locomotive depot. In March 1945, the Bruhrain Railway was broken by the blowing up of the Rhine Bridge.

=== Deutsche Bundesbahn and Deutsche Bahn ===
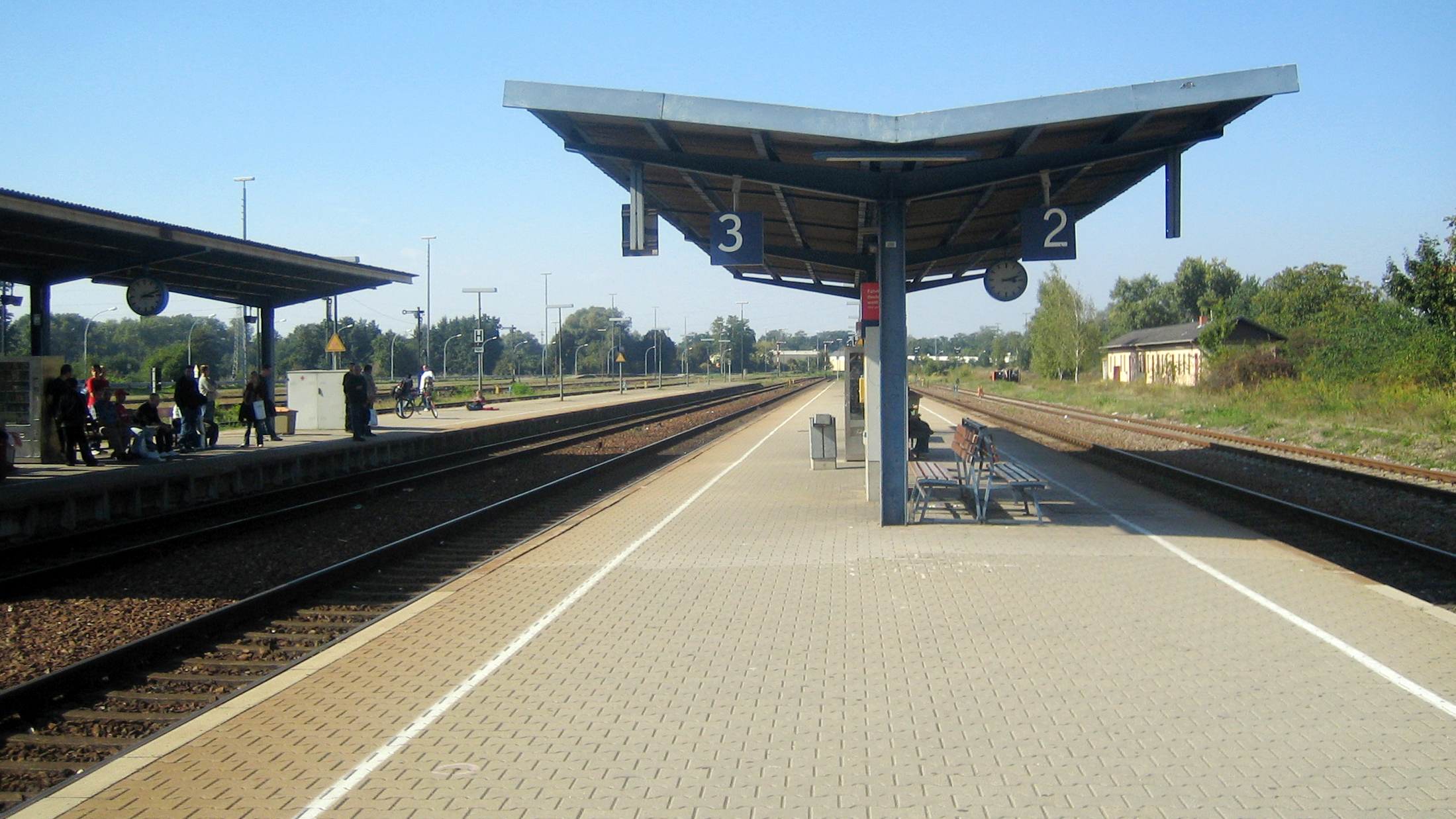
Germersheim Station before the reconstruction of the line for the opening of the Rhine-Neckar S-Bahn (2005)

Deutsche Bundesbahn (DB), which was responsible for railway operations from 1949, assigned the station to the railway division of Mainz, which was responsible for all railway lines within the newly created state of Rhineland-Palatinate. The reconstruction of the Rhine bridge was discussed in the 1950s. Above all, the military had an interest in the reconstruction and preservation of the connection to Landau and its extension to Zweibrücken during the Cold War for strategic reasons. DB received funding from the federal government to finance this project, which was finished in October 1967. The expectations of this project were not fulfilled, however, since the traffic flows within the Palatinate in the east–west direction had long since been concentrated on the Mannheim–Saarbrücken railway.

In the course of the staged dissolution of the railway division of Mainz from 1 August 1971, its counterpart in Karlsruhe took responsibility for the station. Passenger operations on the line to Landau was abandoned on 1 June 1984 due to low demand. As the Rhine Bridge between Karlsruhe and Wörth was heavily damaged by a shipwreck on 9 June 1987, express trains of the Saarbrücken–Zweibrücken–Landau–Wörth–Karlsruhe route ran for four weeks via Germersheim. Freight operations towards Landau ended at the turn of the year 1991/1992.

=== Recent past ===
In the course of the rail reform, the station was assigned to Deutsche Bahn. In 1995, the station became part of the area where services are organised by the Karlsruher Verkehrsverbund (Karlsruhe transport association, KVV). A year later, it also became part of the area where transitional tickets of the Verkehrsverbund Rhein-Neckar (Rhine-Neckar transport association, VRN) are valid.

Lines S3 and S4 of the Rhine-Neckar S-Bahn, which had ended at Speyer, were extended to Germersheim in 2006. As a result, tracks to the station were electrified; the platforms were upgraded at the same time to provide barrier-free entry. The Karlsruhe Stadtbahn between Wörth and Germersheim was opened at the end of 2010. Thus, since then the station has been the northern terminus of lines S 51 and S 52, which connect it to the inner city of Karlsruhe. One year later, the Bruhrain Railway also became part of the Rhine-Neckar S-Bahn, after the original plans for a Karlsruhe Stadtbahn line had been changed. As a result of these measures, the number of users has increased steadily.

== Infrastructure ==
=== Original entrance building ===
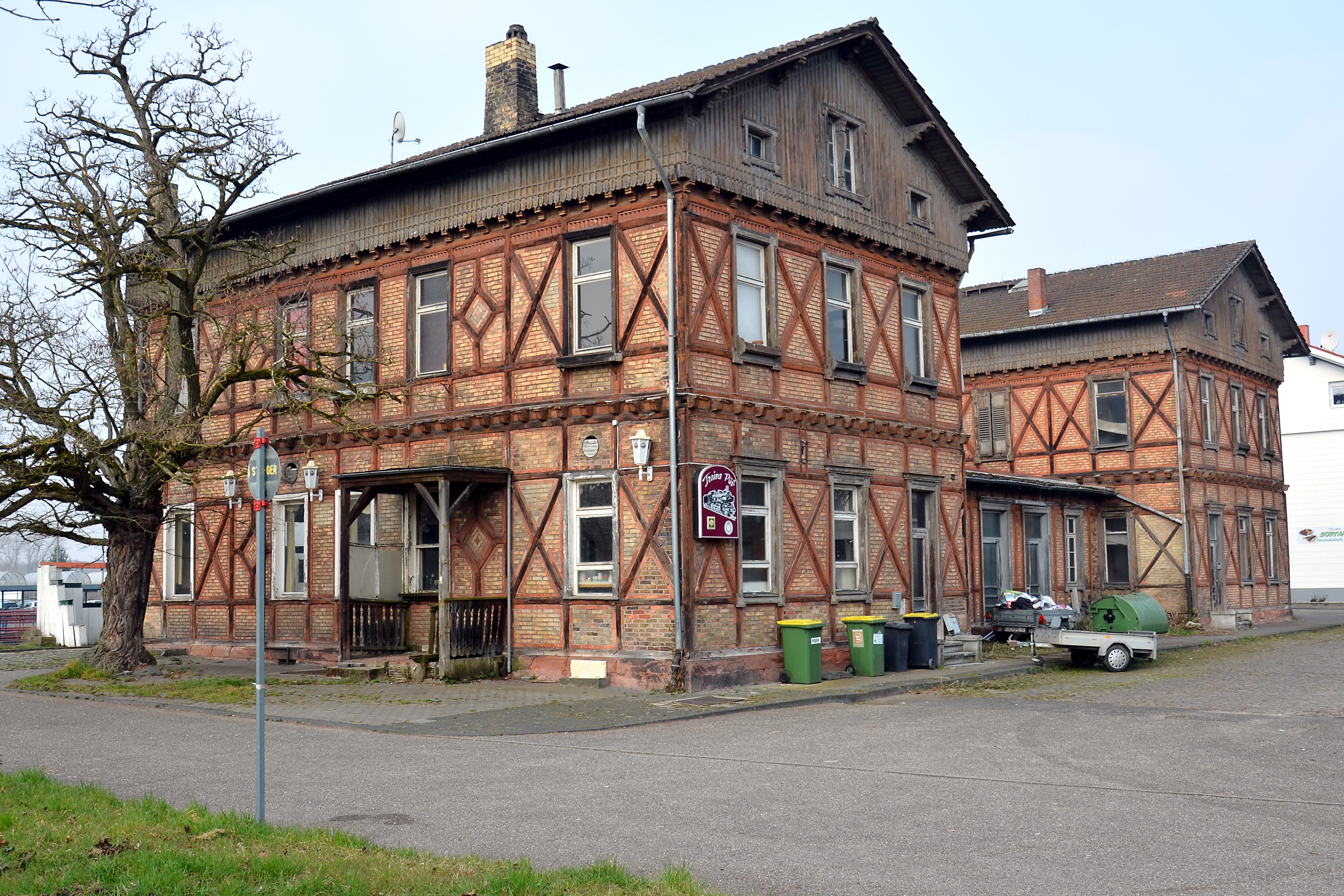
Original entrance building on the eastern side of the tracks

The original station building dates from the opening of the station. It is a partly differentiated or separated half-timber construction made up of three sections. It is heritage-protected. It still housed a station restaurant in the 1950s. It now contains a restaurant and several residential units. The building has not been used for public transport purposes for several years.

=== Current entrance building ===
The new entrance building of the 1980s, which in recent years has been increasingly neglected and was finally closed down, was bought by the city of Germersheim in 2010. The restaurant and kiosk have been reactivated.

=== Platform and tracks ===
Germersheim station has been completely barrier-free since its modernisation in 2006. It has 16 tracks, of which four are platform tracks. The station is equipped with an Electro-mechanical interlocking from Siemens & Halske, which was installed 1912 in a signal box operated by a dispatcher and a signalman. Tracks 1 to 8 were electrified during the extension of the Rhine-Neckar S-Bahn from Speyer to Germersheim at the end of 2006. Electrified industrial sidings branch to Germersheim harbour from the exit towards Philippsburg. The platforms on tracks 2 to 5 are 160 metres-long and 76 cm high.

=== Environment ===
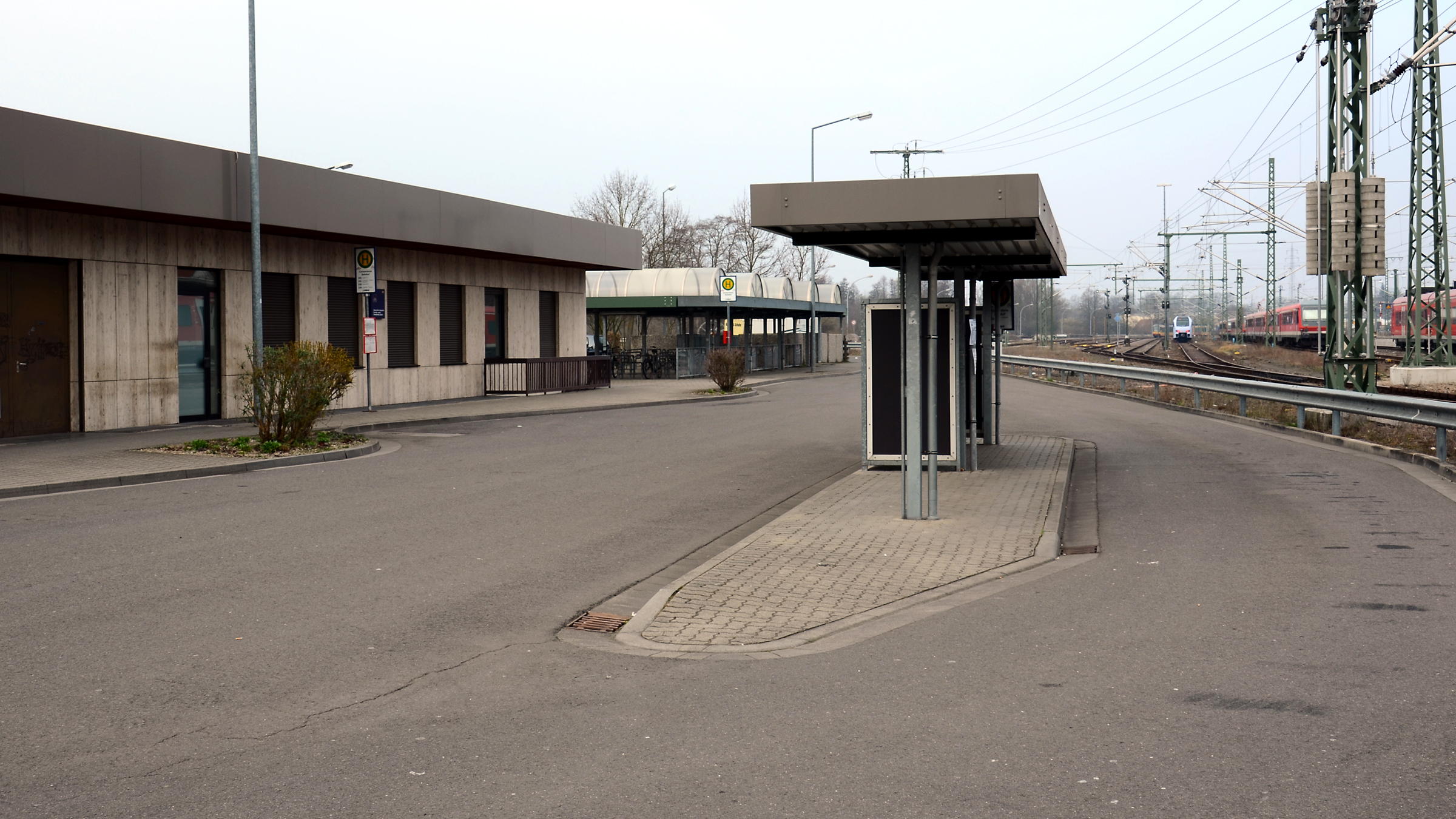
Germersheim bus station

A bus station is located in front of the station. Most of the buses that run here are operated by BRH viabus GmbH and run from here towards Landau and the southern part of Germersheim district.

On the other side of the building is a taxi stand. There is also a park-and-ride parking area and a storage area for bicycles at the station.

== Operations ==
=== Passenger services ===
The following lines operate through Germersheim station (as of 2021):

Line	Route	Frequency
RE 4	Frankfurt Hbf – Mainz Hbf – Worms Hbf – Frankenthal Hbf – Ludwigshafen (Rhein) Hbf – Schifferstadt – Speyer Hbf – Germersheim – Graben-Neudorf – Karlsruhe Hbf	Every 120 minutes
S3	Karlsruhe Hbf – Bruchsal – Heidelberg Hbf – Mannheim Hbf – Ludwigshafen (Rhein) Hbf – Schifferstadt – Speyer Hbf – Germersheim	Every 60 minutes
S33	Germersheim – Philippsburg – Graben-Neudorf – Bruchsal	Every 60 minutes
S4	Bruchsal – Heidelberg Hbf – Mannheim Hbf – Ludwigshafen (Rhein) Hbf – Schifferstadt – Speyer Hbf – Germersheim	Every 60 minutes
S 51	Pforzheim – Söllingen – Berghausen – Grötzingen – Durlach Bahnhof – Durlacher Tor – Europaplatz – Karlsruhe Entenfang – Knielingen Rheinbergstraße – Maximiliansau – Wörth am Rhein – Rheinzabern – Germersheim	Every 60 minutes
S 52	Karlsruhe Hbf – Marktplatz – Europaplatz (Kaiserstraße) – Yorckstraße - Wörth am Rhein – Rheinzabern – Germersheim	Every 60 minutes

=== Freight operations ===
After Germersheim became an important railway junction, its importance in freight transport increased accordingly. Around the beginning of the 20th century, a locomotive of the Palatine G 2 class of the Ludwigshafen locomotive depot was stationed on site for shunting. In addition to Schifferstadt, Speyer and Wörth, it is one of four remaining stations along the former north–south main line, which is still used in freight transport.
