= Graben-Neudorf Nord station =

Railway station in Graben-Neudorf, Germany

Graben-Neudorf Nord
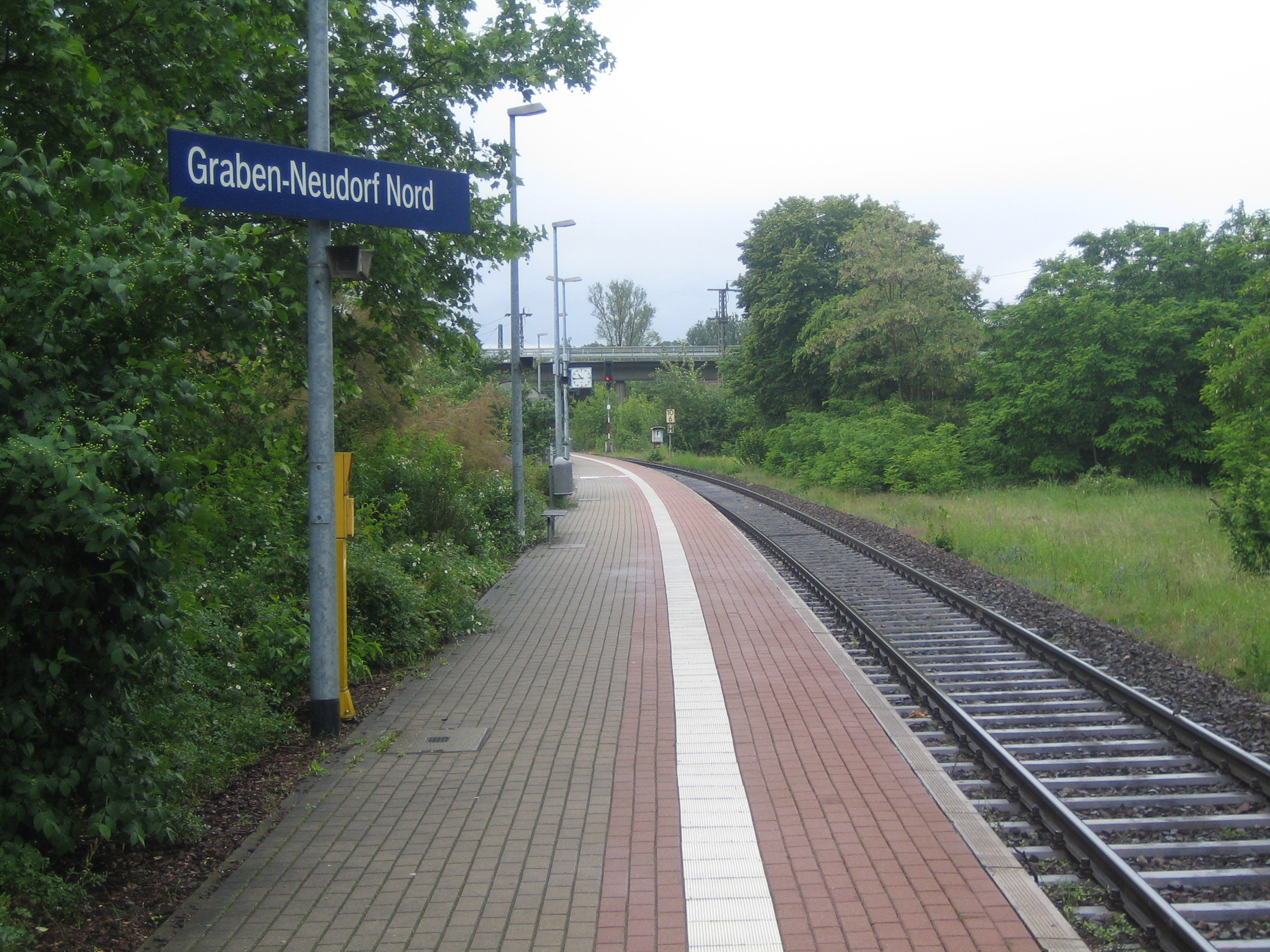
- 2006

General information
- Location: Molzaustraße 1; 76676 Graben-Neudorf; Baden-Württemberg; Germany
- Coordinates: 49.1780°N 8.4942°E
- Owner: Deutsche Bahn
- Operator: DB Station&Service
- Lines: Bruhrain Railway (KBS 665.33)
- Platforms: 1 side platform
- Tracks: 1
- Train operators: S-Bahn RheinNeckar
- Connections: S33

Construction
- Parking: yes
- Cycle facilities: yes
- Accessible: yes

Other information
- Station code: 2224
- DS100 code: RGNN
- IBNR: 8002345
- Category: 6
- Fare zone: KVV: 243
- Website: www.bahnhof.de

Services
Preceding station	Rhine-Neckar S-Bahn	Following station
Huttenheim towards Germersheim	S33	Graben-Neudorf towards Bruchsal
Location

Graben-Neudorf Nord station is a railway station in the municipality of Graben-Neudorf, located in the Karlsruhe district in Baden-Württemberg, Germany.
