= Hockenheim station =

Railway station in Hockenheim, Germany

Hockenheim
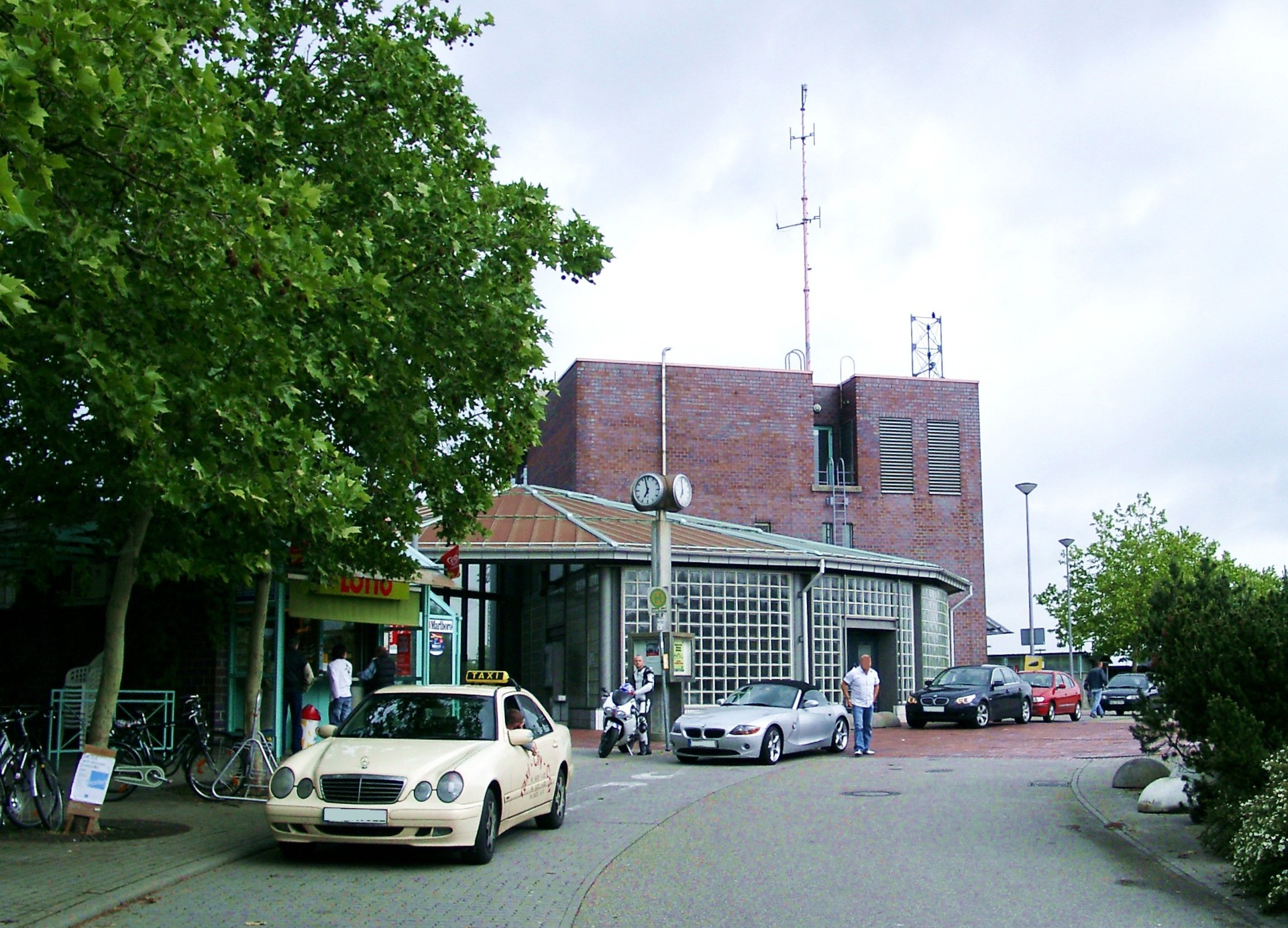
- Forecourt and station building

General information
- Location: Hockenheim, Baden-Württemberg; Germany
- Coordinates: 49°19′03″N 8°32′14″E
- Lines: Mannheim–Stuttgart high-speed railway (km 20.9); Mannheim–Karlsruhe (km 21.7)
- Tracks: 3

Construction
- Accessible: Yes

Other information
- Station code: 2814
- DS100 code: RHK
- IBNR: 8002883
- Category: 4
- Fare zone: VRN: 144
- Website: www.bahnhof.de

History
- Opened: 1986

Services
Preceding station	DB Regio Mitte	Following station
Oftersheim towards Frankfurt (Main) Hbf	RB 67	Terminus
Preceding station	Rhine-Neckar S-Bahn	Following station
Neulußheim towards Karlsruhe Hbf	S9	Oftersheim towards Groß‑Rohrheim
Location

Hockenheim station is a through station in the town of Hockenheim in the German state of Baden-Württemberg. It was rebuilt during the construction of the Mannheim–Stuttgart high-speed railway. It is classified by Deutsche Bahn (DB) as a category 4 station. It has three platforms and it is in the area where fares are set by the Verkehrsverbund Rhein-Neckar (Rhine-Neckar Transport Association, VRN).

== Construction ==
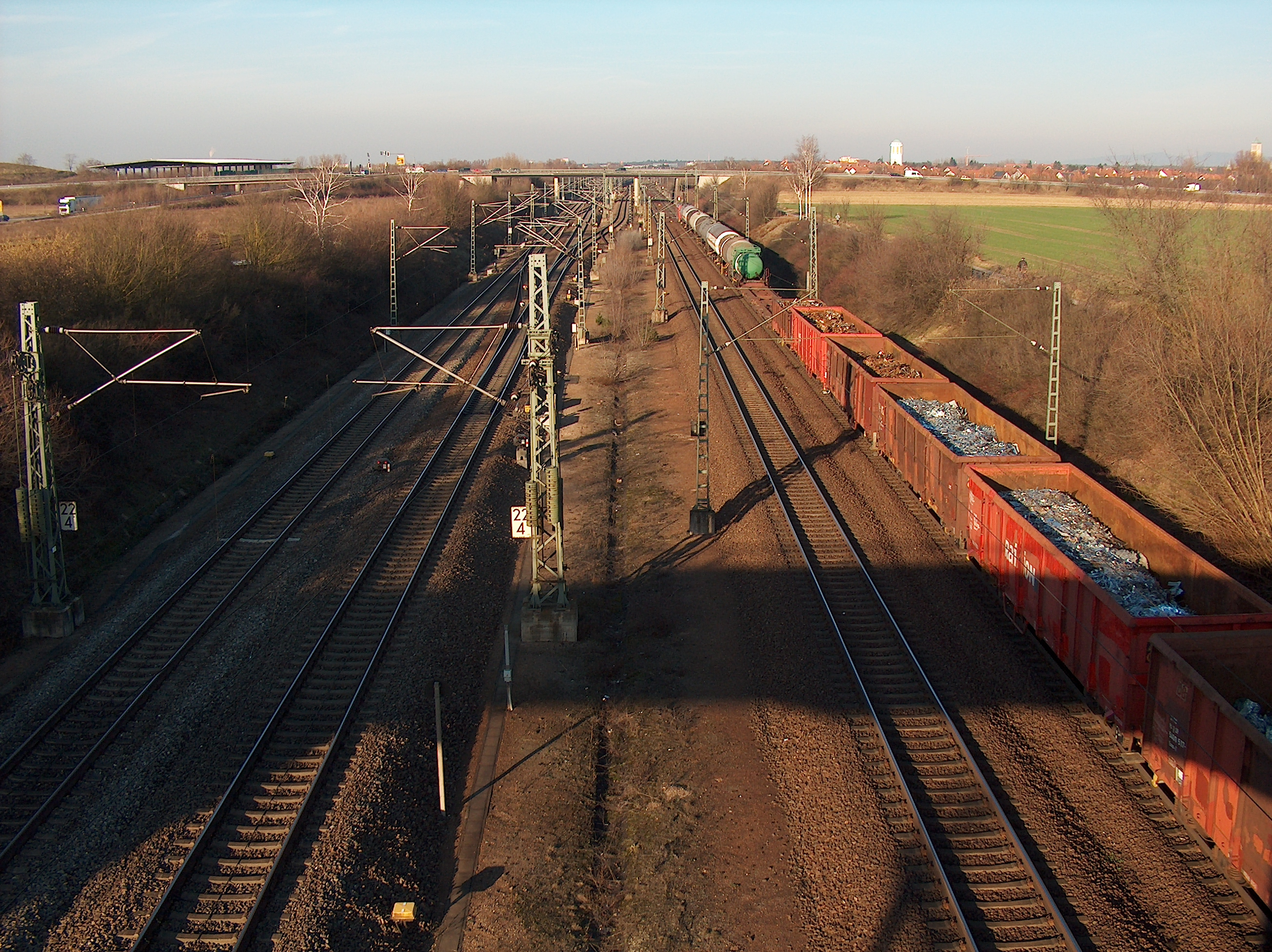
Looking to the south from the station. A freight train on the Rhine Railway heading north

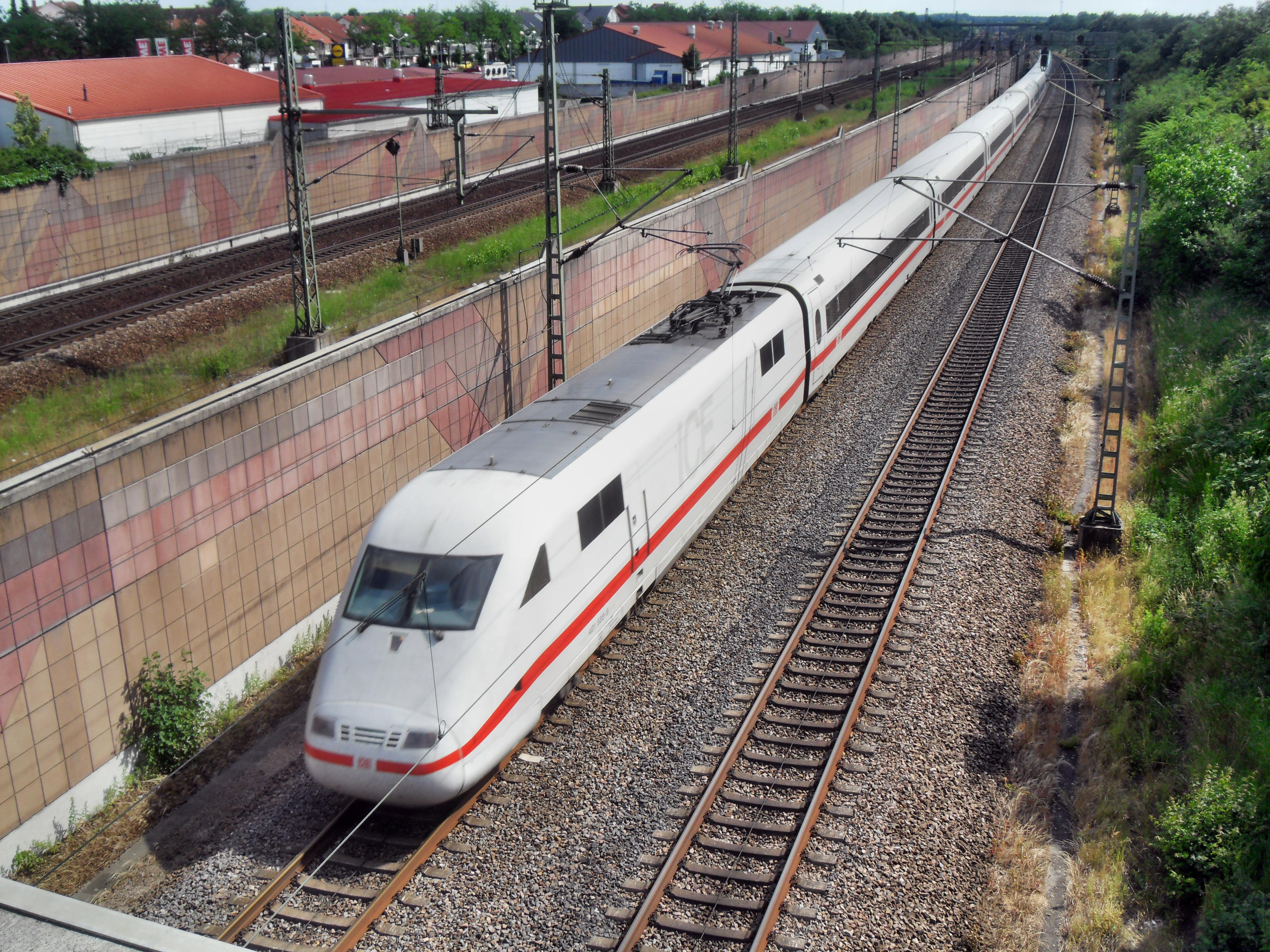
An ICE 1 running towards Mannheim and passing through the station area without stopping.

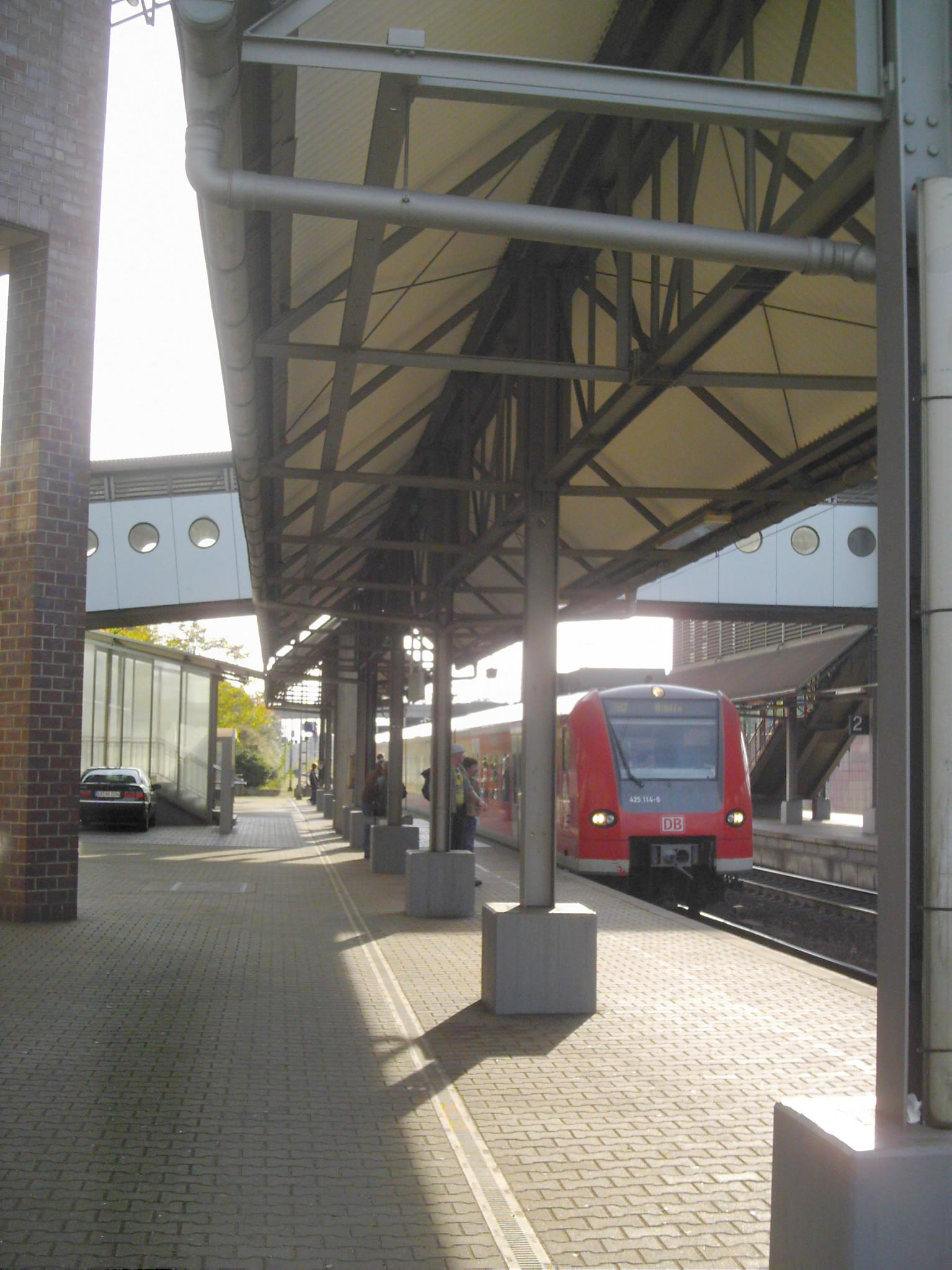
A Regionalbahn service on the way to Biblis on platform 1

The station serves as a passenger station—with two 314 m long platforms—and as a passing place for trains.

The new high-speed line and the Rhine Railway are connected in the station. It is the northernmost of the four connections from the new line to the existing network, excluding those at the ends of the line. Some scheduled trains change between the two lines at the station.

Two passing loops have been built between the two lines.

== History ==
The first Hockenheim station was opened on the Rhine Railway on 4 August 1870 and it was replaced by the new station in 1986.

=== Planning ===
During the planning for the high-speed railway in 1973, provision was made for an operations station in the Hockenheim area (at the 19.0 kilometre point). The new line would run to the west of this town and not be linked with the existing line in this area.

The present route of the Rhine Railway at the station was set out in the planning for zoning section 3a of the new line (covering the Hockenheim–Reilingen section from kilometres 19.183 to 23.291). The planning approval procedure was initiated in May 1976. The public hearing took place in February 1979 in the Hockenheim town hall. This provided for a combination of new and existing track in Hockenheim station.

On 14 May 1980, a new planning approval procedure was initiated for this section. The 62 objections that were raised were discussed on 18 December 1980. The opinion of the Regional Council was submitted on 30 September 1981. Two lawsuits were filed against the planning decision of 24 November 1981, but the decision was given legal endorsement on 8 June 1984.

The Mannheim-Stuttgart project group opened an information centre in Hockenheim at the beginning of 1983.

=== Construction ===
To make room for the new line and the existing line to be bundled together, the Rhine Railway was moved 130 metres to the west during the construction work. Bundesstraße 36 (federal highway 36) was included in the infrastructure bundle, which was intended to minimise environmental impacts. According to Deutsche Bahn, the noise of the town has been reduced to a quarter by the bundling of the routes together and additional mitigation measures. The route formerly used by Rhine Railway was re-vegetated. The town of Hockenheim planned (as of 1988) to integrate recreational facilities in this green space.

The last trees were planted in the area at the end of December 1988.

=== Commissioning ===
The relocated section of the Rhine Railway—including the new Hockenheim station—went into operation on 1 September 1986.

== Technology ==
One of the first (initially experimental) electronic interlockings built in Germany (class El S) was opened at the station in 1988. Special functions for new high-speed lines, which were not to be found on the existing network, were tested at the signal box there in preparation for their approval and use in electronic interlocking in Germany. Over a length of about 12 km between the stations of Hockenheim and Graben-Neudorf (Molzau junction), the functions of the new technology were first tested in parallel with the existing technology although the new technology was not given responsibility for safety. A temporary relay interlocking (class Sp Dr S600) was built in Hockenheim station with a minimum of equipment (one block section with a length of 12 km) for operations and safety testing of the electronic interlocking for at least one year. After a positive outcome of the test of operations, the “second stage” of the Hockenheim electronic interlocking was installed and the storage area on the north half of the new line (50 km) was developed.

The signal box took control of the line between the stations of Hockenheim and Neulußheim and the new line between Mannheim and Bauersbach (almost 60 km of the new line) in 1986.
