= Friedrichstal (Baden) station =

Railway station in Stutensee, Germany

Friedrichstal (Baden)
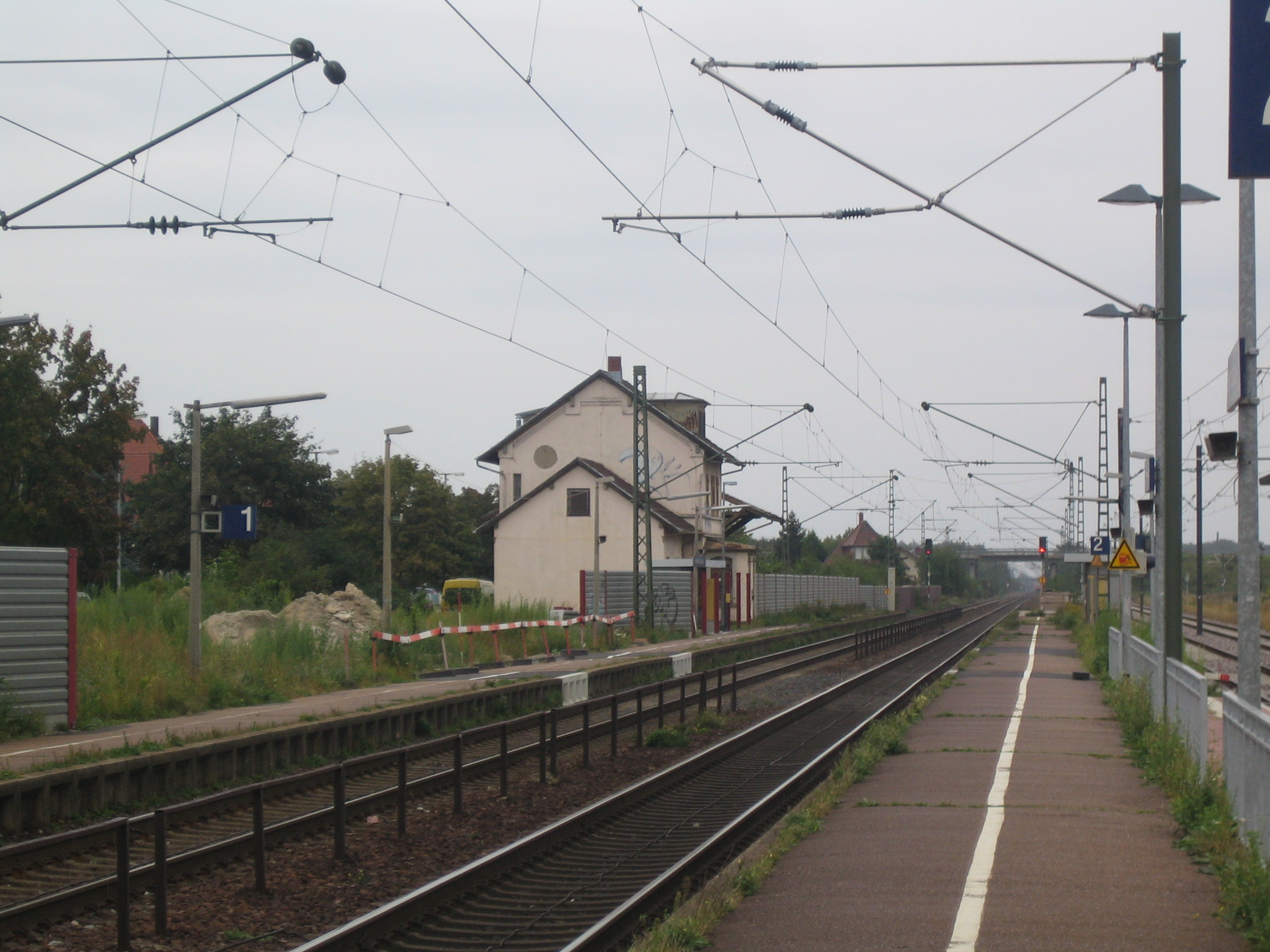
- 2006

General information
- Location: Mannheimer Straße; 76297 Stutensee-Friedrichstal; Baden-Württemberg; Germany
- Coordinates: 49.1009°N 8.4742°E
- System: Hp
- Owner: Deutsche Bahn
- Operator: DB Station&Service
- Lines: Mannheim–Karlsruhe railway (KBS 700)
- Platforms: 2 side platforms
- Tracks: 2
- Train operators: DB Regio Mitte
- Connections: S 2 at Friedrichstal Saint-Riquier-Platz station

Construction
- Parking: yes
- Cycle facilities: yes
- Accessible: yes

Other information
- Station code: 1954
- DS100 code: RFTL
- IBNR: 8002116
- Category: 6
- Fare zone: KVV: 236
- Website: www.bahnhof.de

Services
Preceding station	Rhine-Neckar S-Bahn	Following station
Blankenloch towards Karlsruhe Hbf	S9	Graben-Neudorf towards Groß‑Rohrheim
Location
- Location within Baden-Württemberg Location within Germany Location within Europe

Friedrichstal (Baden) station is a railway station in the municipality of Stutensee-Friedrichstal, located in the Karlsruhe district in Baden-Württemberg, Germany. The Stadtbahn Karlsruhe station Friedrichstal Saint-Riquier-Platz is adjacent to Friedrichstal (Baden) station.
