= RNL (disambiguation) =

RNL may refer to:

- RNL Design, a Denver-based multidisciplinary design firm
- rnl, the ISO 639-3 code for Ranglong
- Tingoa Airport, the IATA code RNL
- Reverse in-order, type of depth-first-search
- Ricki Noel Lander, an American actress and model
- Neulußheim station, the DS100 code RNL
