= Graben-Neudorf station =

Railway station in Germany

Graben-Neudorf
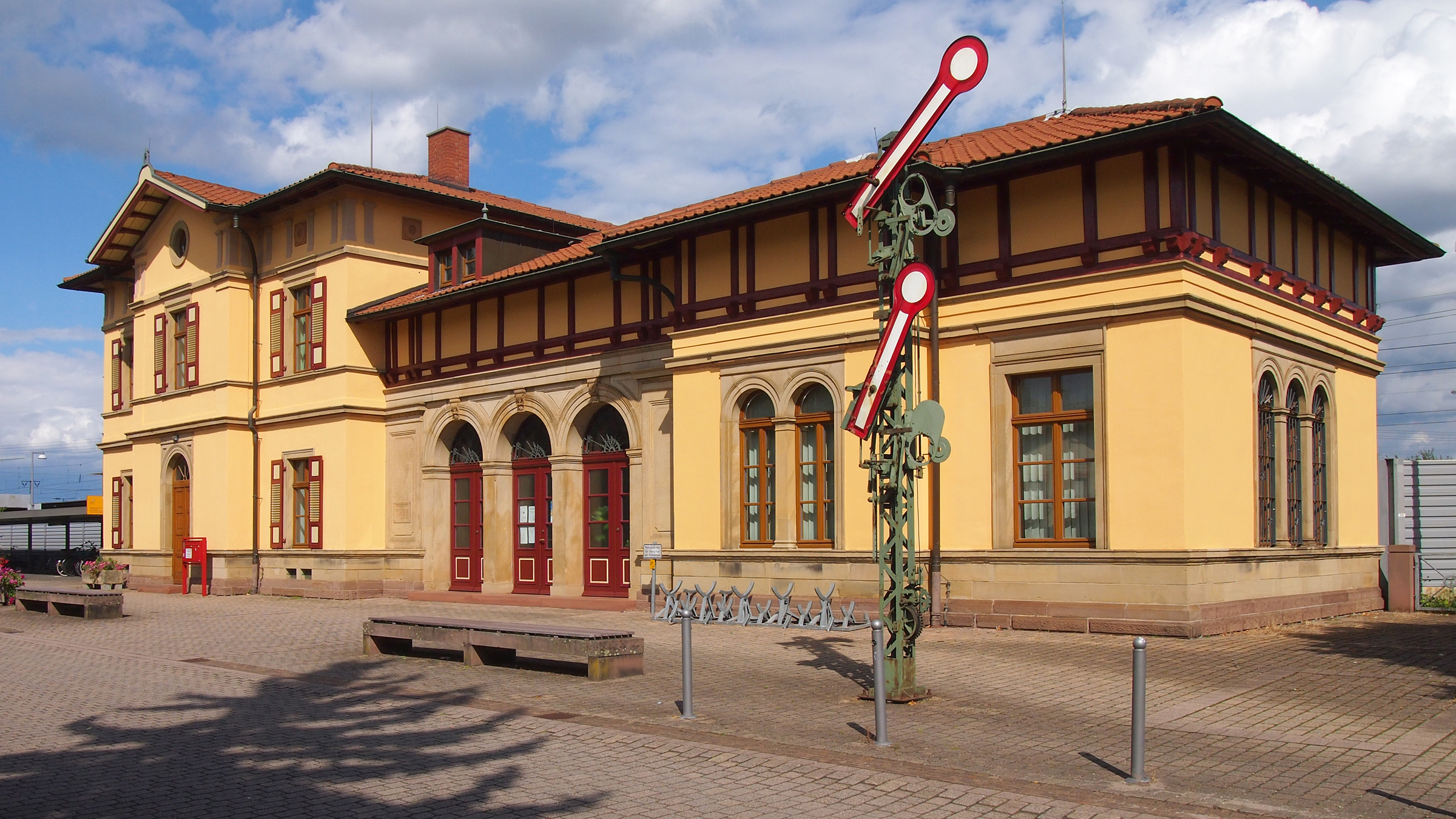
- Old station of Graben-Neudorf

General information
- Location: Bahnhofstraße 43, Graben-Neudorf, Baden-Württemberg; Germany
- Coordinates: 49°9′43″N 8°29′26″E
- Owner: Deutsche Bahn
- Operator: DB Station&Service
- Lines: Mannheim–Karlsruhe railway (KBS 700); Waghäusel Saalbach–Graben-Neudorf (KBS 700); Bruhrain Railway: Germersheim–Bruchsal (KBS 665.33); former Hardt Railway: Graben-Neudorf–Karlsruhe
- Platforms: 5

Construction
- Accessible: Yes

Other information
- Station code: 2223
- DS100 code: RGN
- IBNR: 8000131
- Category: 3
- Fare zone: KVV: 243
- Website: www.bahnhof.de

History
- Opened: 1870

Services
Preceding station	DB Regio Mitte	Following station
Philippsburg (Baden) towards Frankfurt (Main) Hbf	RE 4	Karlsruhe Hbf Terminus
Preceding station	Rhine-Neckar S-Bahn	Following station
Friedrichstal (Baden) towards Karlsruhe Hbf	S9	Wiesental towards Groß‑Rohrheim
Graben-Neudorf Nord towards Germersheim	S33	Karlsdorf towards Bruchsal
Location

Graben-Neudorf station is the focal point of the town of Graben-Neudorf in the German state of Baden-Württemberg. It is of particular importance for rail transport because it is a railway junction, which is crossed by the Rhine Railway between Mannheim and Karlsruhe, connecting to the Rhine Valley Railway to Basle, and the Bruhrain Railway (Bruhrainbahn) between Bruchsal and Germersheim. In addition, the strategic railway opened in 1895 to Karlsruhe branched off the original Rhine Railway here. The original line (Graben-Neudorf–Eggenstein–Karlsruhe) became known as the Hardt Railway (Hardtbahn), but it became disused in 1967. The station is classified by Deutsche Bahn as a category 4 station.

== Location and facilities ==
Graben-Neudorf station is centrally located between the districts of Graben and Neudorf in the municipality of Graben-Neudorf. The town of Neudorf is on the east side of the line and the residential and industrial area of its centre, which is to the east of the station, including shops in Heidelberger Straße, has grown strongly. Today's station building was opened in 1980. A relay interlocking system was put into operation in 1982. The station building is not always open and the waiting room is no longer operational. Part of the building is leased to a security company and another part of the building houses a bakery. The old station building now houses the town library.

Graben-Neudorf station has five tracks accessible by passenger trains at a total of three platforms with a platform height of 76 cm (the standard of the Rhine-Neckar S-Bahn) and electronic train destination indicators. Line S 33 of the Rhine-Neckar S-Bahn commenced in December 2011 on the Bruhrain Railway (Germersheim–Bruchsal) through Graben-Neudorf station and replaced the former class 628 diesel multiple units. Two ticket machines with the latest generation of touchscreen functions are available for the purchase of tickets on regional and long-distance services.

The station is accessible from the west and the east side and has ample parking and bike racks on both sides. An underpass for pedestrians and cyclists links Bahnhofsring in the west and Heidelberger Straße in the east.

=== Other stations in Graben-Neudorf ===
Apart from Graben-Neudorf station, Graben-Neudorf is also served by Graben-Neudorf Nord station. It lies on the Bruchsal-Germersheim line (Bruhrain Railway) in the northwestern suburb of Neudorf on Molzaustraße. It was opened in May 1994 with the launch of the integrated regular interval timetable by the Karlsruher Verkehrsverbunds (Karlsruhe Transport Association) and the state of Rhineland-Palatinate.

The planned Graben-Neudorf Sud station will not be built in the foreseeable future. It was proposed to build it on the Rhine Railway near Adolf-Kußmaul School in the southeastern district of Graben in association with the construction of a small residential development. The funding (€42 million) required from the municipality of Graben-Neudorf is currently too high.

== Transport services ==
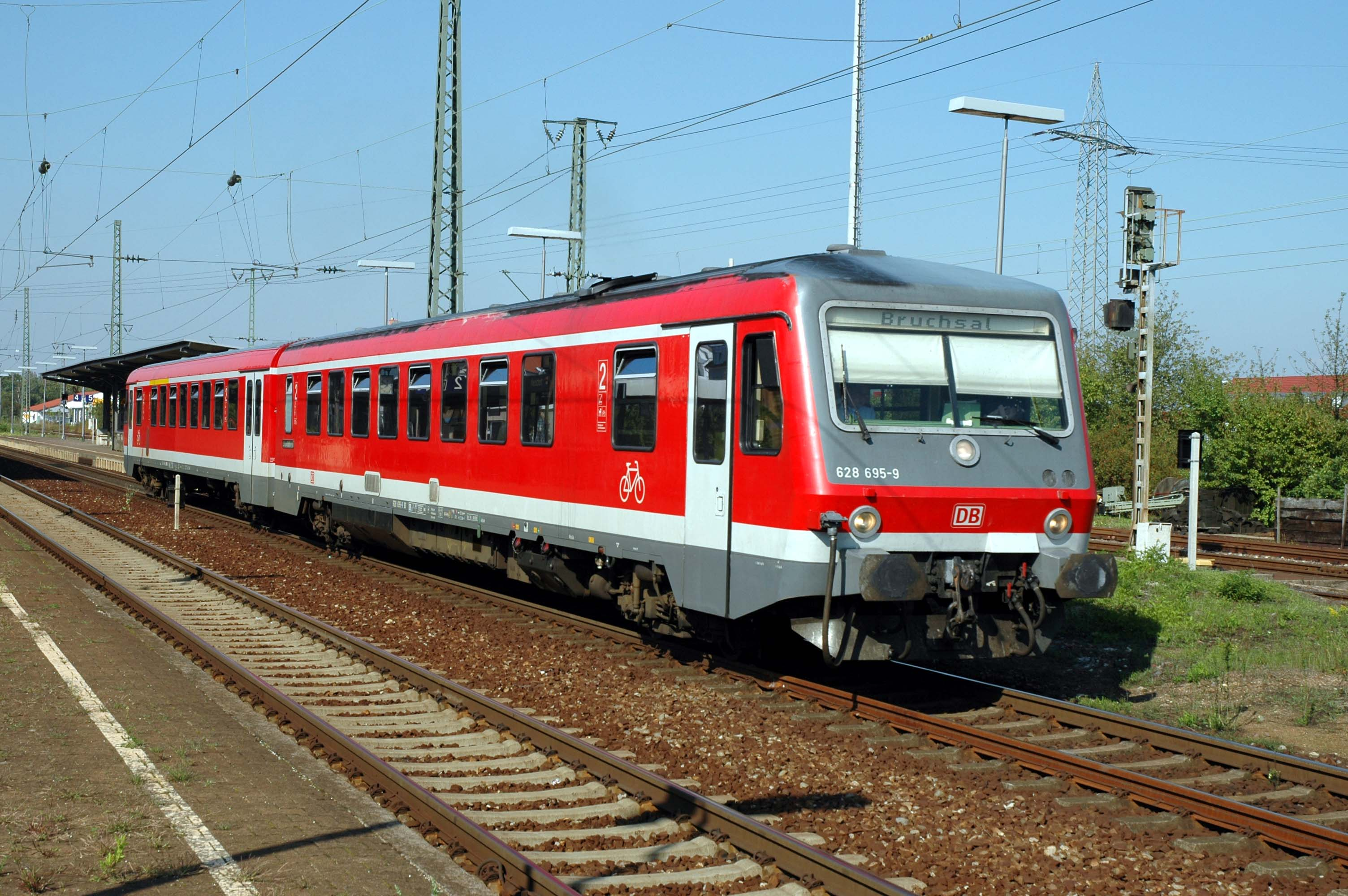
Regionalbahn service at the exit to Graben-Neudorf station towards Bruchsal. This route is now served by S 33 S-Bahn services

The station is served by Regionalbahn, S-Bahn and Regional-Express services.

Since December 2007, Graben-Neudorf station has been connected to the bus network. The Hochstetten–Neudorf and Graben-Neudorf–Dettenheim bus lines top here at stop called Graben-Neudorf Bahnhof, which is located opposite the station building on Bahnhofsring.

Line	Route	Frequency
RE 4	Mainz – Worms – Ludwigshafen – Germersheim – Graben-Neudorf – Karlsruhe	120 min
S9	Karlsruhe – Graben-Neudorf – Mannheim – Biblis – Groß Rohrheim	60 min; 30 min (Graben–Mannheim)
S33	Bruchsal – Graben-Neudorf – Philippsburg (Baden) – Germersheim	60 min

== History ==
=== Development and opening of the rail junction ===
The history of the station began with the opening of the Mannheim–Schwetzingen–Graben Neudorf–Eggenstein Karlsruhe line on 4 August 1870. On 23 November 1874, the Bruhrain Railway was opened to Rheinsheim and extended on 15 May 1877 to Germersheim.

In 1895, the strategic railway was opened on the Graben-Neudorf–Blankenloch–Karlsruhe–Durmersheim–Rastatt–Haguenau route, so from then on the line now designated as the Hardt Railway from Graben-Neudorf to Eggenstein and Karlsruhe became a branch line.

The first long-distance trains ran in about 1890 on the Bruhrain Railway on the Munich–Stuttgart–Bretten–Bruchsal–Germersheim–Landau–Biebermühle–Zweibrücken–Saarbrücken route, as well as on the Rhine Railway between Karlsruhe and Mannheim. After the Second World War, the east-west long-distance services on the Bruhrain Railway became insignificant and were eventually abandoned. Despite the fact that the station was a junction of two interregional lines, it was never a stop for long-distance services.

=== 20th century ===
In 1967, operations on the Hardt Railway were abandoned and the line between Graben-Neudorf and Leopoldshafen was dismantled. Between 1987 and 1989, the Hardt Railway was reactivated with some re-routing through the centres of towns to Hochstetten. Today it is operated by Albtal-Verkehrs-Gesellschaft (AVG) with high passenger loadings as part of Karlsruhe Stadtbahn lines S 1 and S 11. An Extension of the Stadtbahn to Graben-Neudorf on the old line has been considered, but does not seem feasible, especially as Graben-Neudorf is on the Rhine Railway and so is directly connected to Karlsruhe. In the long term, continuing the lines running over the Hardt Railway from Hochstetten via Dettenheim to Philippsburg appears promising.

In 1972 there was dangerous accident at the station. A barrel containing plutonium fell off a freight train on its way to the Nuclear Research Center Karlsruhe (Kernforschungszentrum Karlsruhe) and rolled on to the track in Graben-Neudorf station. It was knocked off the track by passing trains. The barrel was found by searchers in protective suits after hours of searching. The plutonium had not escaped from the barrel.
