= Waghäusel Saalbach–Graben-Neudorf railway =

Railway line in Germany

Waghäusel Saalbach – Graben-Neudorf railway
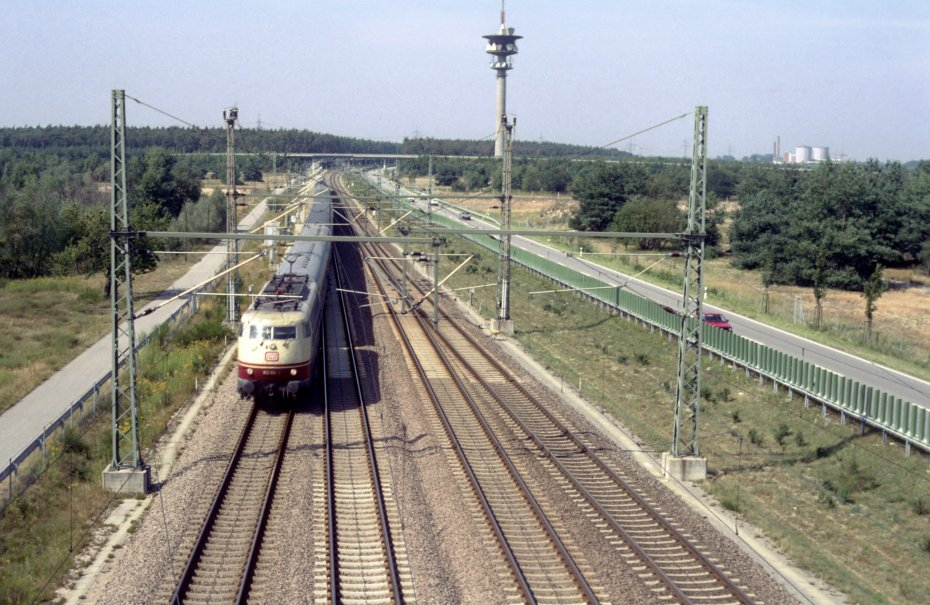
- A train running through Waghäusel Saalbach junction, which can be passed at 200 km/h

Overview
- Line number: 4082
- Locale: Baden-Württemberg, Germany; Alsace, France

Service
- Route number: 700

Technical
- Line length: 7.94 km (4.93 mi)
- Number of tracks: 2: (Waghäusel Saalbach–Philippsburg Molzau)
- Track gauge: 1,435 mm (4 ft 8 1/2 in) standard gauge
- Electrification: 15 kV/16.7 Hz AC overhead catenary
- Operating speed: 200 km/h (124.3 mph) (maximum)

The Waghäusel Saalbach–Graben-Neudorf railway is a 7.94 km long railway north of Karlsruhe, Germany. It connects the Mannheim–Stuttgart high-speed railway with the Rhine Railway and is used by scheduled trains between Mannheim and Karlsruhe.

== Route ==
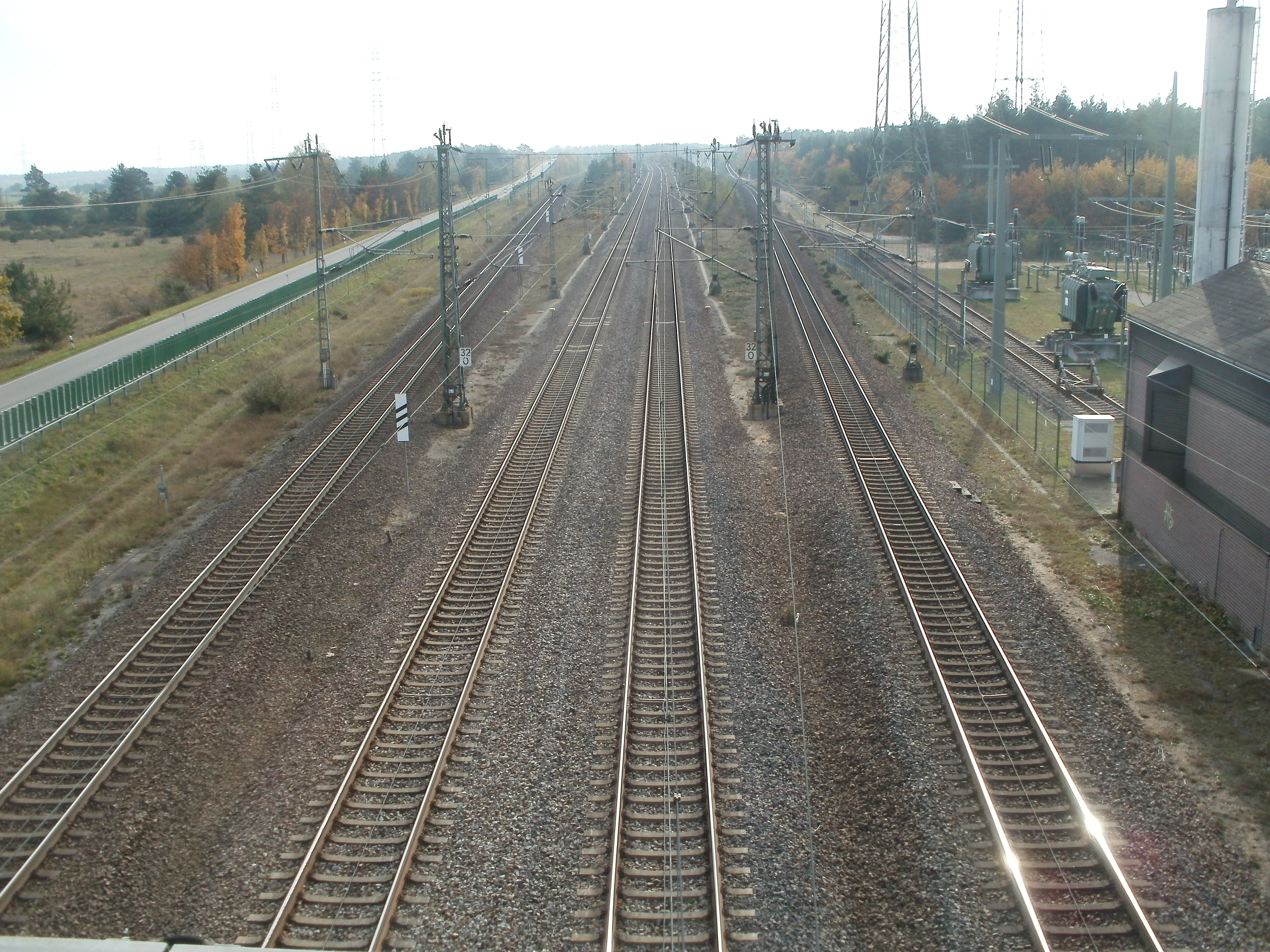
The two tracks of the line, just after separating from the new line to Stuttgart (south view)

The route runs between Waghäusel Saalbach junction (kilometre 31.7 of the new line) via Philippsburg Molzau junction (km 34.6 of the Rhine Railway) to Graben-Neudorf station. Both branches are grade separated. Three tracks are occupied by these parallel railways between Molzau and the southern exit in Graben-Neudorf to the Rhine Railway.

== History ==
=== Planning ===
The link was already envisaged in the early planning in 1973.

During the planning and construction, the track was divided for planning approval purposes into sections 4b (northern section, Philippsburg area) and 4c (southern section, Graben-Neudorf area). The new Mannheim–Stuttgart railway in the section from the entrance and exit to Graben-Neudorf was included in section 4a (Waghäusel). In the mid 1970s, the entrance and exit tracks from the new line were designated as Überholbahnhof Oberhausen (Oberhausen crossing station) and the plans provided for overtaking movements. Such overtaking was no longer envisaged in the planning in 1979.

The approval procedure for section 4b was initiated on 21 August 1975. Three objections were discussed on 5 April 1978. Following the expression of an opinion by the regional council of 21 November 1978, the proposal was adopted on 10 January 197, and being unopposed, was made final on 10 April 1979.

The approval procedure for section 4c was also initiated on 21 August 1975. At the public hearing on 12 June 1978, ten objections from citizens and the community were considered. The opinion of the regional council was presented on 10 August 1979 and the proposal was adopted on 25 September 1979, subject to a lawsuit. It was given legal endorsement on 29 April 1980. According to another source the planning approval for this section was given on 16 October 1979, and since there were no complaints, it had immediate legal effect.

The approval procedure for section 4a was initiated on 4 February 1976. At the public hearing on 8 June 1978 22, objections were considered. The regional council issued its opinion by 12 February 1979. Six lawsuits were filed against the zoning decision issued on 10 May 1979. The decision gained legal force on 15 June 1981.

Originally, a turnout speed of 130 km/h was planned for Saalbach junction.

=== Construction ===
Construction work on the 4.5 km-long connecting line began in early September 1980.

=== Operations ===
Saalbach junction has been in use since May 1988 with a design speed of 200 km/h.

== High-speed switches ==
"Basket arch" turnouts (Korbbogenweichen) were built in 1988 at Saalbach junction so that trains could branch at 200 km/h. They were initially the most elaborate turnouts in Germany. As the continuation of the high-speed line to Stuttgart was then under construction, the points were initially fixed in the branching position. Their length is 154 m and their weight (including the concrete sleepers) is 210 t. The point blades are 40 m-long, the moveable point frogs are 15 m long. The radius of the branching track is initially 7,000 m and reduces at the frog to 6000 m. The two sets of point blades are operated by two turnout motors with eight points of activation and closed with eight clamps. Separate test contacts are used to monitor the position of the points. The moveable point frogs are activated by a motor and secured by three clip fasteners. In the points area, two points signals are installed at the approaches and a third in the centre of the turnout. Another innovation was the use of slide chairs that require little lubrication. The two turnouts are still among the fastest in terms of operating speeds in Germany.
