= Bruhrain Railway =

Railway line

Bruchsal–Germersheim railway
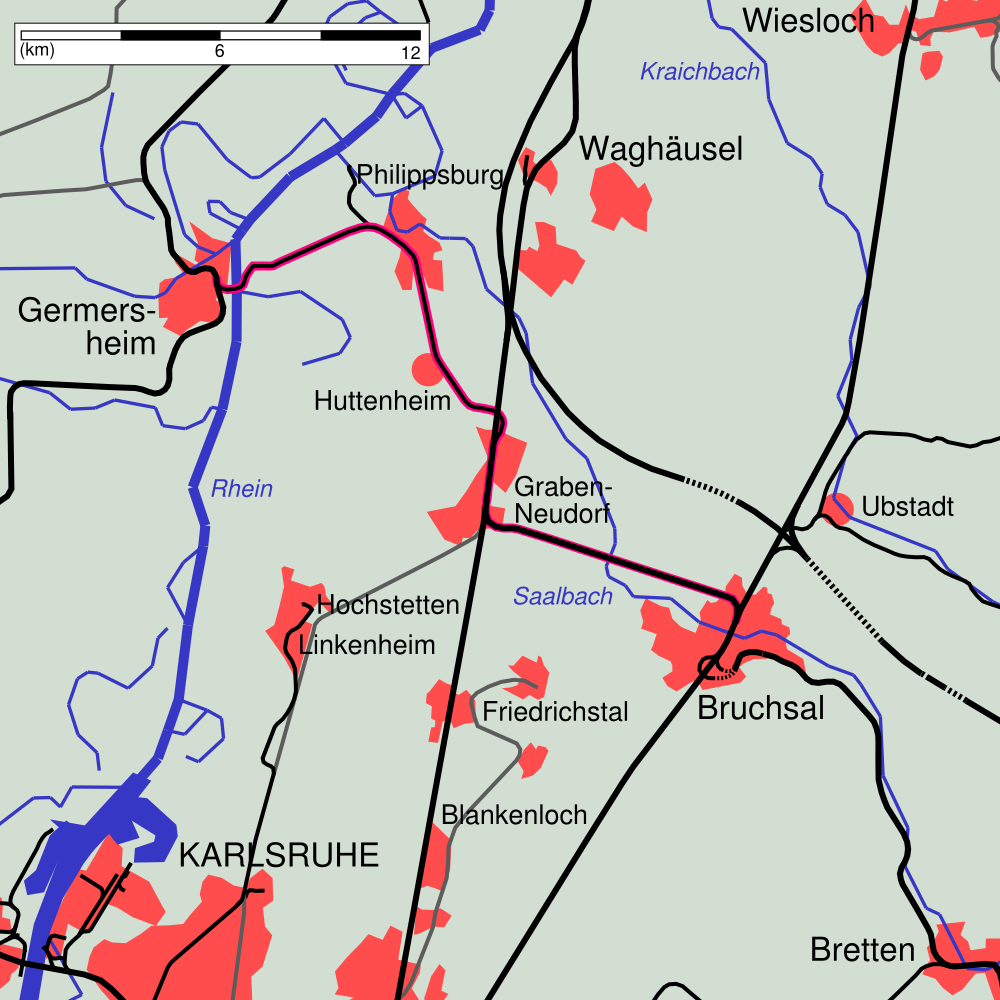

Overview
- Line number: 3450 (Rheinsheim–Germersheim); 4132 (Bruchsal–Rheinsheim)
- Locale: Baden-Württemberg and Rhineland-Palatinate, Germany

Service
- Route number: 665.33

Technical
- Line length: 25.62 km (15.92 mi)
- Number of tracks: 2 from Bruchsal to Graben-Neudorf
- Track gauge: 1,435 mm (4 ft 8 1/2 in) standard gauge
- Minimum radius: 300 m
- Electrification: 15 kV/16.7 Hz AC overhead catenary
- Maximum incline: 1.2%

The Bruhrain Railway (German: Bruhrainbahn) is a railway line running from Bruchsal to Germersheim in the German states of Baden-Württemberg and Rhineland-Palatinate. Whilst it was part of a national trunk line (Magistrale) and handled long-distance traffic; today the line is exclusively worked by local trains.

It takes its name from the Bruhrain, a region in the northwestern part of Karlsruhe district, which it passes through.

== Route ==
The line is entirely within the Rhine valley and it forms an almost a straight line between Bruchsal and Graben-Neudorf. The two largest engineering structures are the bridge over the Rhine Railway north of Graben-Neudorf and the Rhine bridge between Rheinsheim and Germersheim.

The line runs from Bruchsal through the municipalities of Karlsdorf-Neuthard and Graben-Neudorf. The line runs from Huttenheim to Rheinsheim along the boundaries of the town of Phillipsburg, before finishing at Germersheim. From Bruchsal to the Rhine, the line runs within the district of Karlsruhe. Across the Rhine, the line runs through the district of Germersheim.

== History ==
=== Planning, construction and development up to 1900 ===
A treaty between the Grand Duchy of Baden and the Kingdom of Bavaria authorised the building of a railway line from Bruchsal to Germersheim.

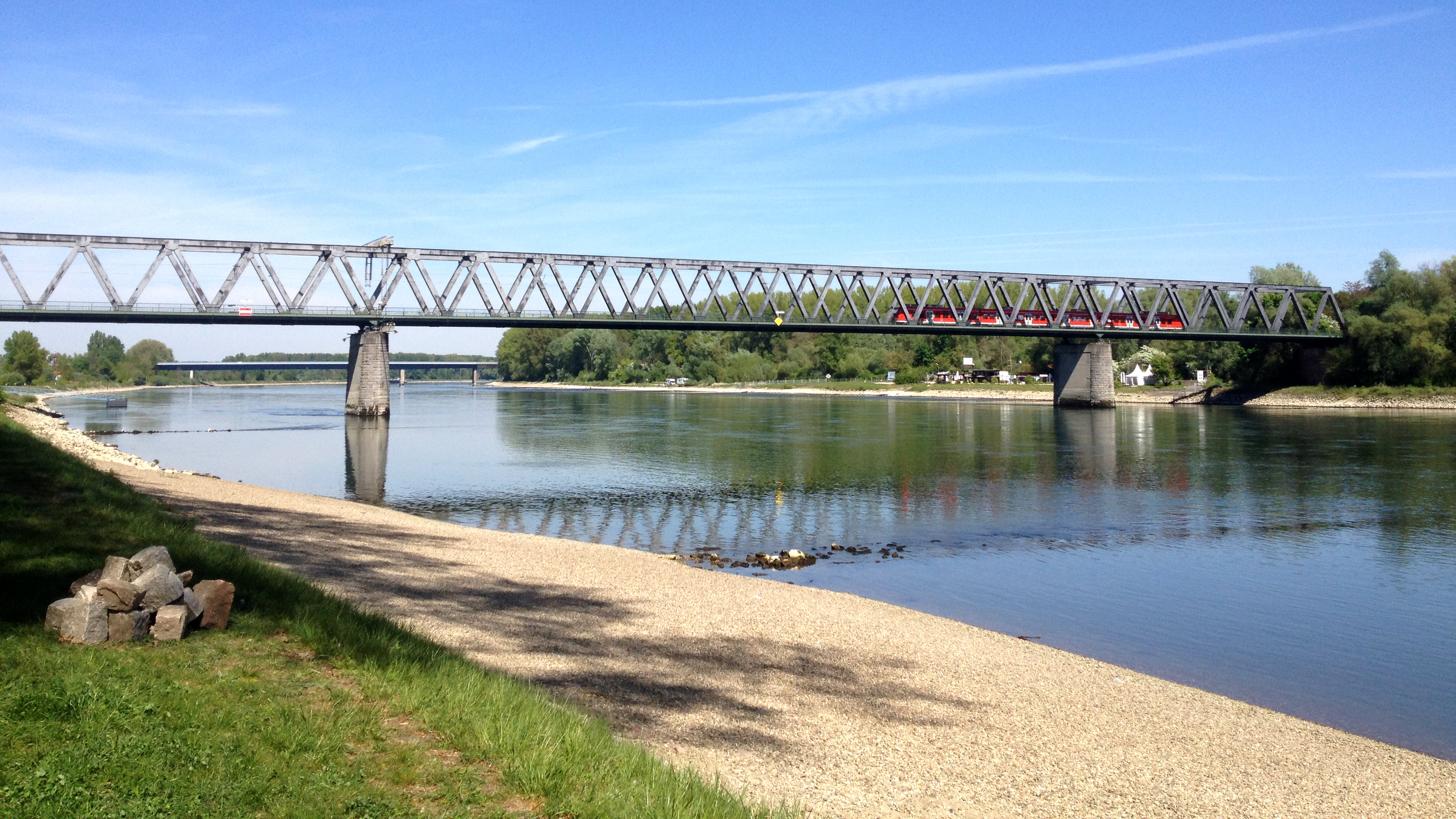
Rhine Bridge at Germersheim

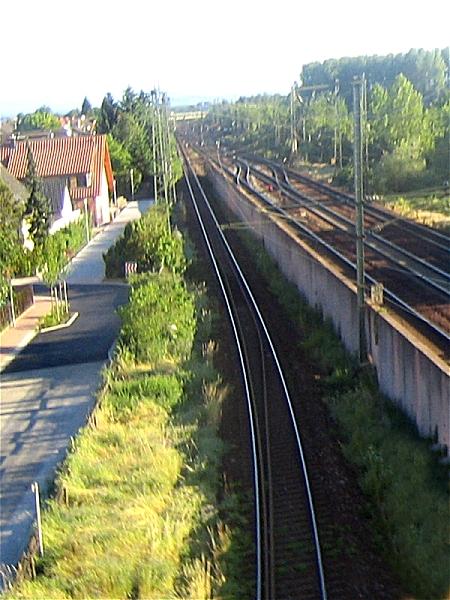
Bruhrain Railway (left in picture) north of Graben-Neudorf, Rhine Railway to the right. This grade-separated crossing was opened in 1909

On 15 August 1870, a temporary "war railway" (Kriegsbahn) was opened between the two towns as a supply line for the Franco-Prussian War, but it was closed on 12 August 1871. Some of it was used for later the Bruhrain Railway, but in other parts, its route is used for roads that still exist.

The Bruchsal–Rheinsheim section opened on 23 November 1874. The extension to Germersheim was delayed for a few years, as the military authorities insisted that the bridge should have a location that would not interfere with the line of fire from the fortress of Germersheim. In August 1874, after an agreement was reached regarding the location of the bridge over the Rhine, the plan to extend the line to Germersheim was approved and work began on 9 April 1875.

On 15 May 1877, the gap was closed between Rheinsheim and Germersheim. The Bruhrain Railway was now passable throughout. While only one track was initially operated over the Rhine bridge at Germersheim, a few years later the second track was put in operation.

The Bruhrain Railway was from 1890 used for the first time as part of an inter-regional connection, running on the Bruchsal–Germersheim–Landau–Biebermühle–Zweibrücken–Saarbrücken route. The Lower Queich Valley Railway is now closed between Germersheim and Landau. In addition, long-distance trains also ran from that time between Munich and Saarbrücken on the Bruhrain Railway.

=== Developments until the Second World War ===
The long-distance services gained even more importance in 1909, when a grade separated junction was opened between the Bruhrain Railway and the Rhine Railway north of Graben-Neudorf. The old line between Huttenheim and Graben-Neudorf is still recognisable from the road layout and the use of two signal boxes.

Since the weight of trains had increased steadily on the line, it was necessary to strengthen the structure of the bridge over the Rhine. This was done between 1927 and 1930.

In 1938, the operation of long-distance traffic between Saarbrücken and Munich over the Bruhrain Railway was reorganised. The Bruhrain Railway subsequently only carried long-distance freight transport, while the long-distance passenger services ran instead via Karlsruhe and Worth and then continued via Landau and Zweibrücken to Saarbrücken.

In the Second World War, several military trains also ran on the line. During the war, the importance of the line increased, as gradually all the bridges over the Rhine—except the Rhine bridge between Rheinsheim and Germersheim—were blown up by German troops to impede Allied troops crossing the Rhine. Finally, on 24 March 1945, the Rhine bridge between Rheinsheim and Germersheim was also destroyed.

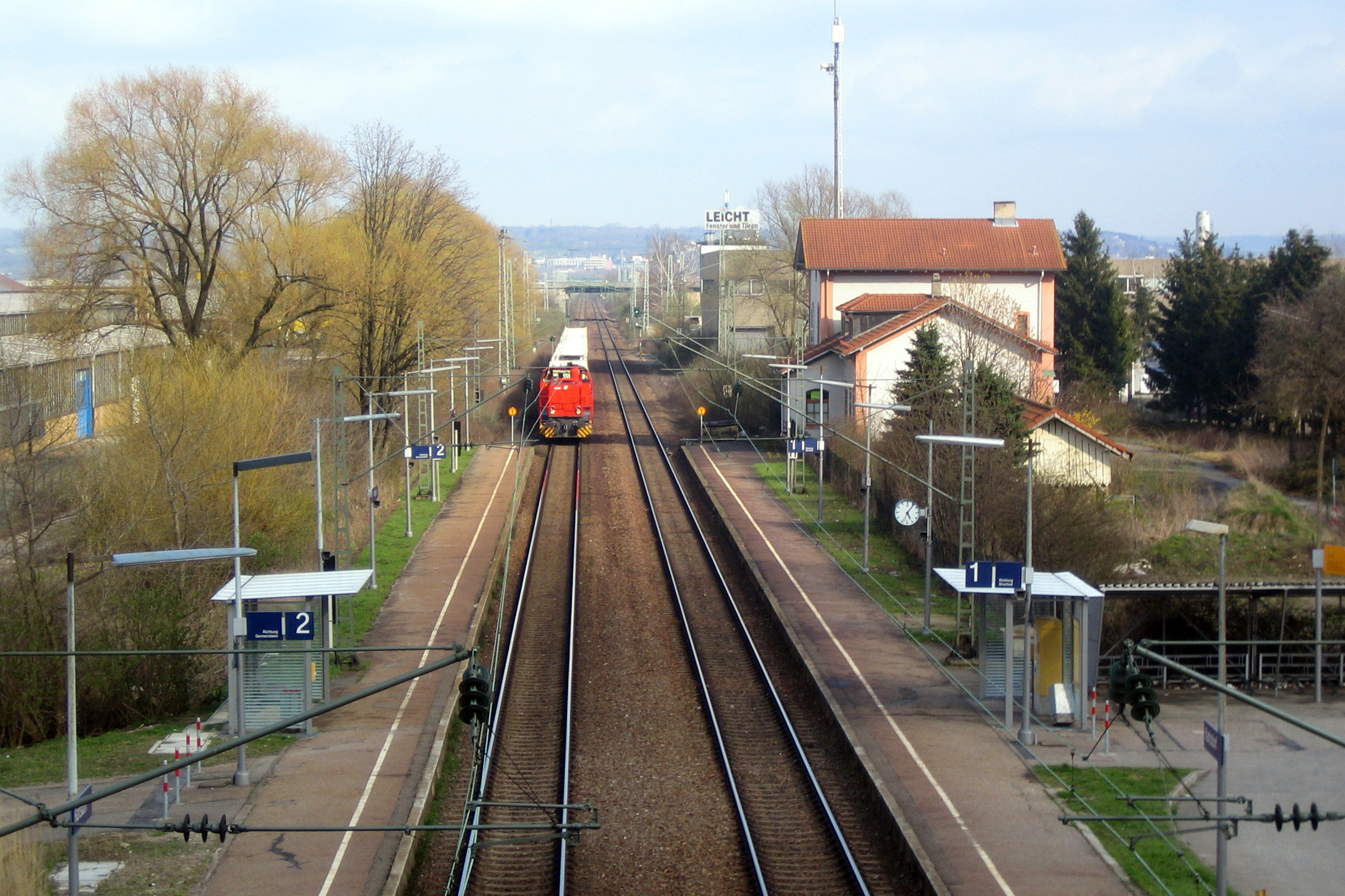
Karlsdorf station with travelling freight train

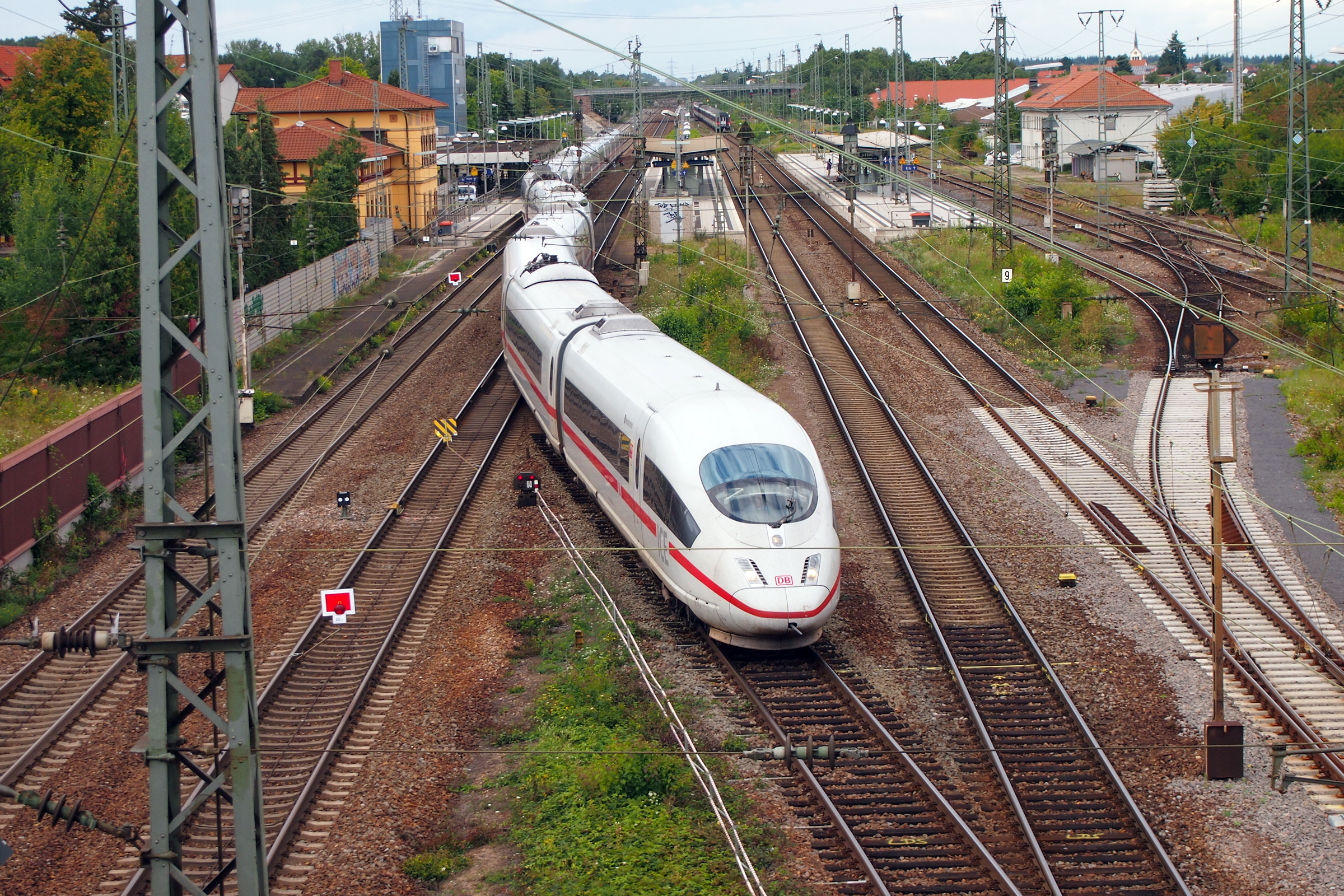
Station Graben - Neudorf

=== Operations under Deutsche Bahn (since 1945) ===
As part of war reparations, which Germany had to pay because it lost World War II, the Bruhrain Railway between Graben-Neudorf and Germersheim was reduced to one track. Since the section between Graben-Neudorf and Bruchsal had great importance for rail traffic, it kept its second track. Electrification of this section was completed on 1 June 1958.

From the 1960s there was considerable debate about the reconstruction of the bridge over the Rhine. Opponents of the reconstruction highlighted the small importance of the bridge for traffic, yet approval for the work was announced in 1964. Three years later, on 23 October 1967, the bridge over the Rhine was reopened. However, contrary to expectations, it continued to have no more than regional significance.

At the end of the 1980s, services of regional trains of the Saarbrücken–Zweibrücken–Landau–Karlsruhe route ran for a few weeks on the Bruhrain Railway because the bridge over the Rhine between Karlsruhe and Worth had to be repaired after it had been damaged by a barge and express trains were diverted over the Bruhrain Railway.

In 1994, the Rhine bridge between Rheinsheim and Germersheim was reduced to operations with only one track. At the same time Rheinsheim station was reduced to the status of a halt (Haltepunkt, that is it has no sets of points). In May 1994, the halt of Graben-Neudorf Nord was opened between Graben-Neudorf station and Huttenheim in order to improve access to the town of Neudorf. From the spring of 2000, the Regional-Express line was introduced on the Mainz–Germersheim–Karlsruhe route every two hours, which travelled over the Germersheim–Graben-Neudorf section of the Bruhrain Railway.

In the course of the upgrade of the line for S-Bahn operations, the Graben-Neudorf-Germersheim section was electrified in 2010 and 2011 and three new stations were built at Bruchsal Sportzentrum, Bruchsal Am Mantel and Germersheim Mitte. The existing six stations were modernised. The platforms were then raised to a height of 76 cm and extended to a length of 140 m (corresponding, for example, to two class 425 multiple units). At the timetable change on Sunday 11 December 2011, the new S-Bahn services were opened between Germersheim and Bruchsal and integrated into the Rhine-Neckar S-Bahn as line S 33.

== Operations ==
=== Timetable ===
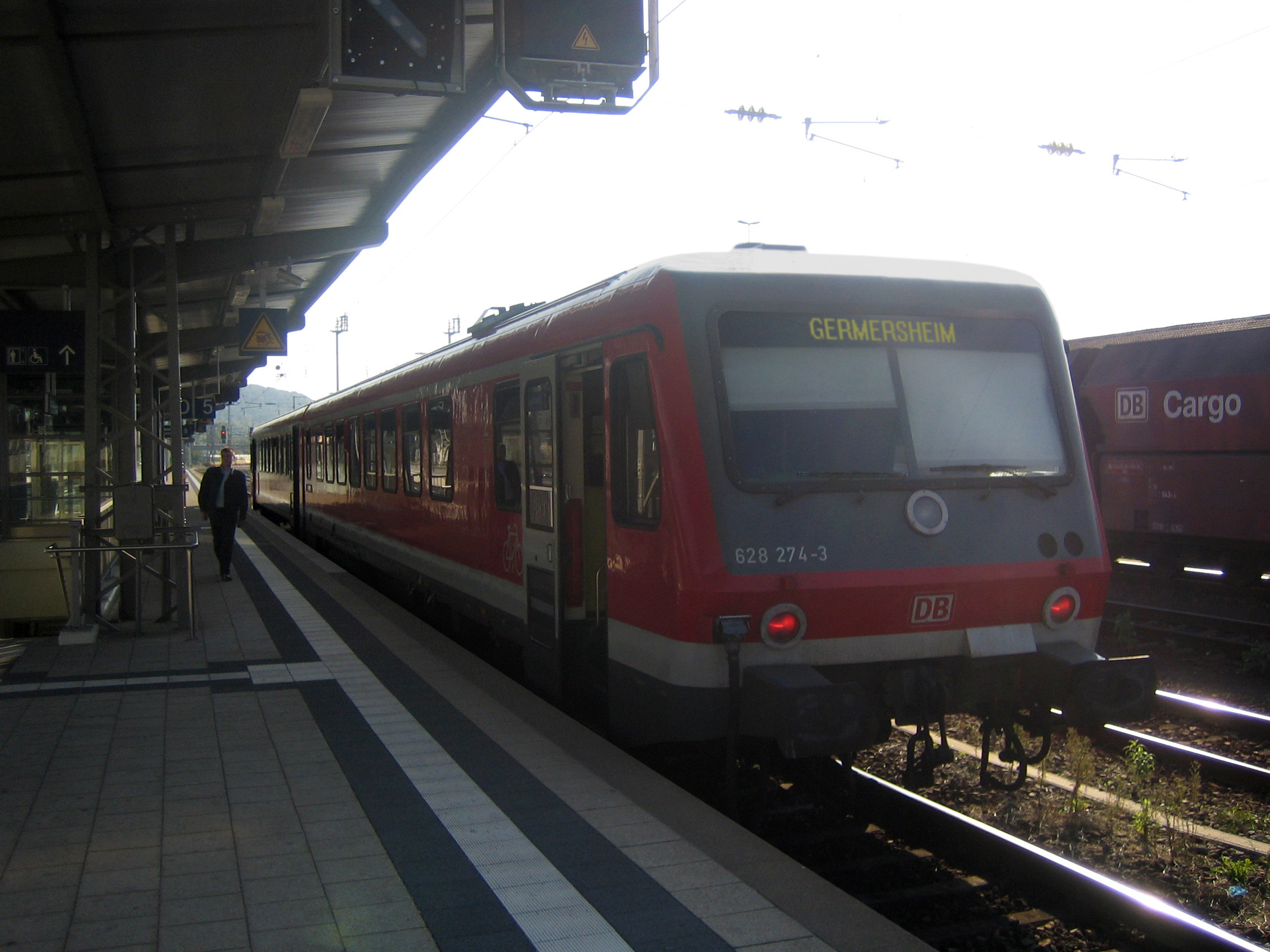
Class 628 on the Bruhrain Railway in Bruchsal

The Bruhrain Railway is listed under table 704 of the Deutsche Bahn timetable. As of May 1994, the Bruhrain Railway also benefited from two improvements to its services: firstly, through the establishment of the Karlsruher Verkehrsverbund (Karlsruhe Transport Association, KVV), which has since managed services on the railway as line R 9; and, secondly, the introduction of the Rhineland-Palatinate integrated regular interval timetable (Rheinland-Pfalz-Takt). Hourly services were introduced under the new timetable, including for the first time since 1945 through trains on Sundays.

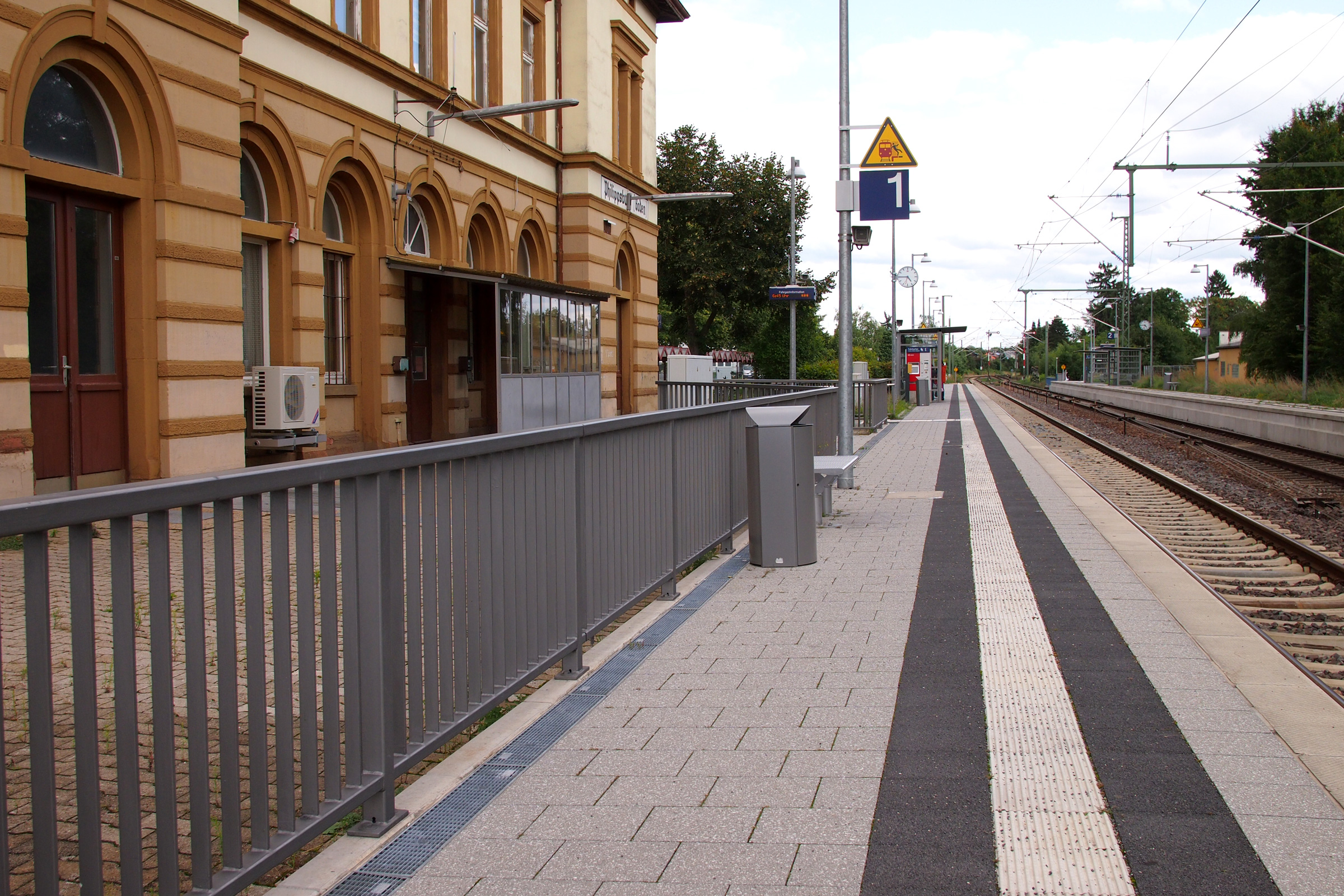
Philippsburg station

S-Bahn services of the Rhine-Neckar S-Bahn are operated on the line with class 425 sets, as line S 33, running from Bruchsal to Germersheim, Multiple trains are scheduled to provide S3/S4 services to Karlsruhe Hbf/Bruchsal via Mannheim and Heidelberg. On the Graben-Neudorf–Germersheim section Regional-Express (RE) services run every two hours on the Karlsruhe–Speyer–Germersheim–Mannheim–Worms–Mainz route, using class 429 multiple units. The only intermediate stop for RE services between Graben-Neudorf and Germersheim is Phillipsburg.

The trip by S-Bahn from Bruchsal to Germersheim takes a total of 30 minutes, a ride on a Regional-Express service from Graben-Neudorf to Germersheim lasts 16 minutes.

=== Traffic ===
The line is electrified. On the Bruchsal–Graben Neudorf section freight services operate towards Kornwestheim marshalling yard in Stuttgart. Freight has decreased significantly in recent decades on the Graben-Neudorf–Germersheim section. Between Philipsburg and Rheinsheim, however, there is a siding to the Philippsburg Nuclear Power Plant, which is served by a few freight trains. On the single track section between Graben-Neudorf and Germersheim the only passing loop is at Philipsburg.

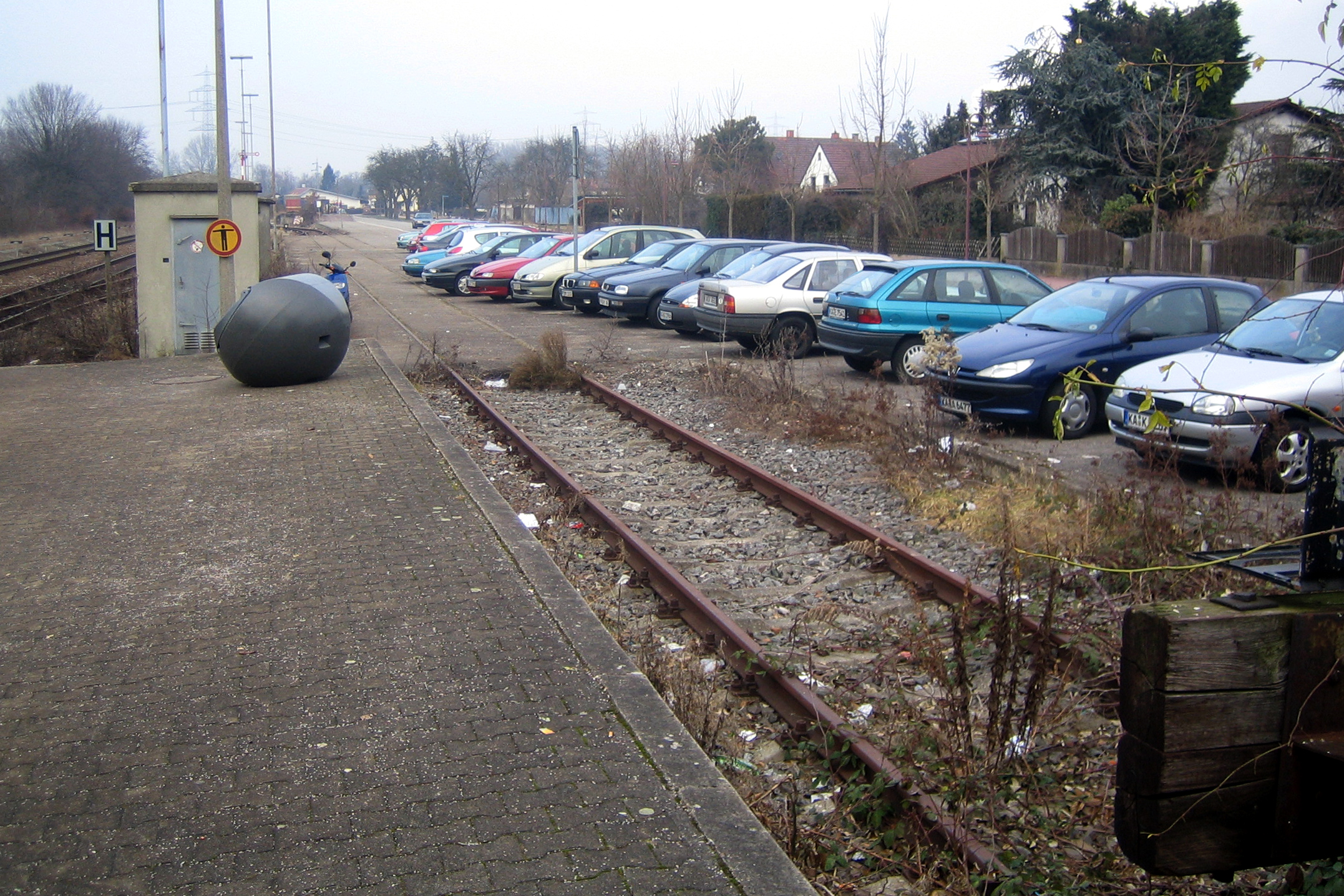
Abandoned freight tracks in Philippsburg

From the early 1990s until the introduction of the Rhine-Neckar S-Bahn there were services on the Bruchsal–Germersheim–Ludwigshafen–Mannheim–Heidelberg–Neckargemünd–Meckenheim–Sinsheim–Steinsfurt–Eppingen/Heilbronn route, operated with locomotives of class 218 hauling Silberling carriages. At the end of 2003 these services were abandoned with the opening of the first stage of the Rhine-Neckar S-Bahn and services on the Bruhrain Railway stopped at Speyer. With the extension of the Rhine-Neckar S-Bahn from Speyer to Germersheim in December 2006, the trains on the Bruhrain Railway only ran as far as Germersheim. Since the integration of the Bruhrain Railway in the Rhine-Neckar S-Bahn in December 2011, some services continue past Germersheim.

At the end of 2004, the push–pull trains hauled by class 218 locomotives were replaced with class 628 diesel multiple units. These in turn were replaced in December 2011 by class 425 electric multiple units.

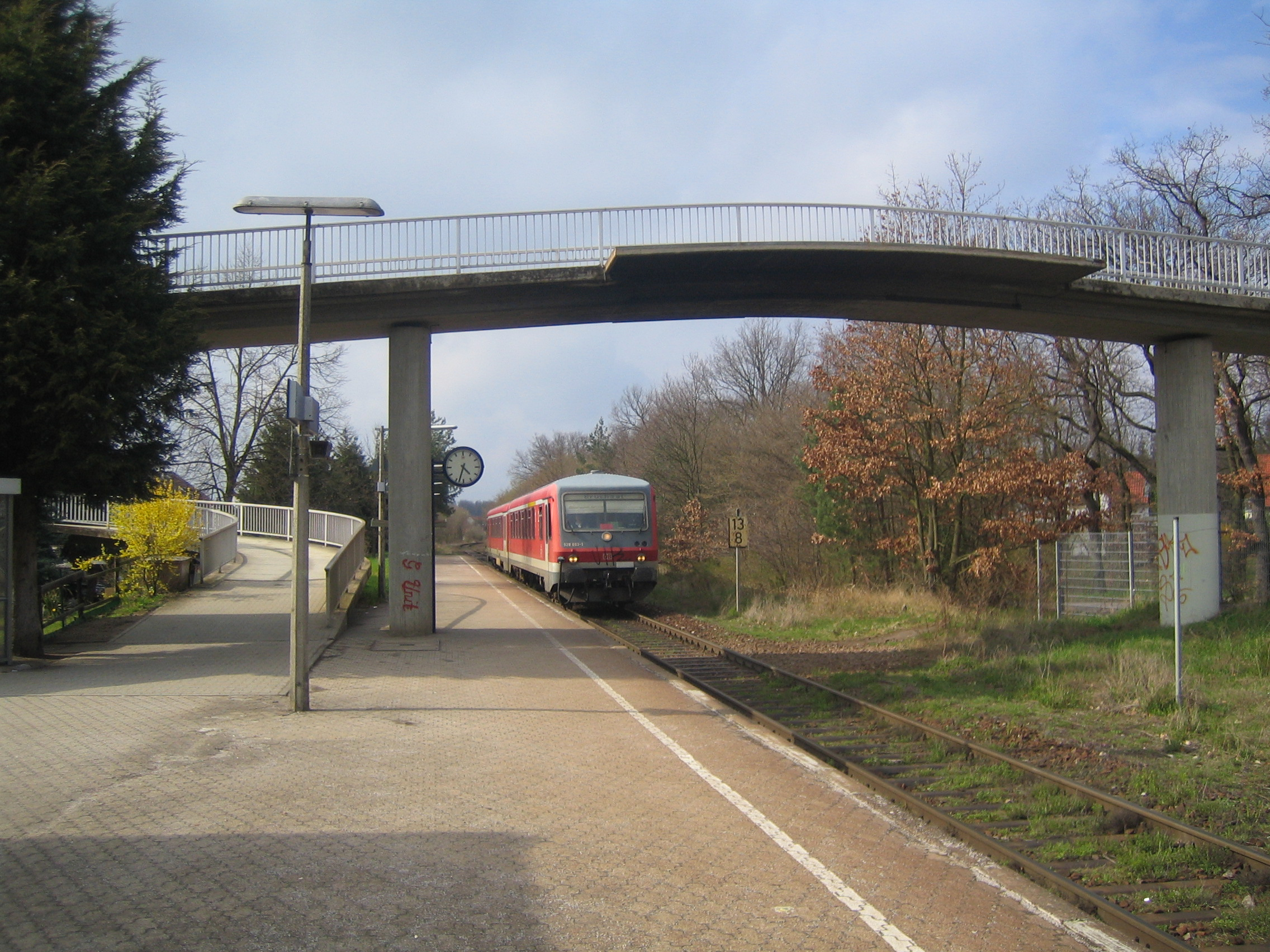
Huttenheim station

=== Future ===
An extension of the Hardt Railway (Hardtbahn) services (S 1 and S 11 of the Karlsruhe Stadtbahn) from Linkenheim-Hochstetten to connect with Phillipsburg station on the Bruhrain Railway has been considered, but seems rather unrealistic in the current circumstances.

It may become necessary to duplicate the western section of the Bruhrain Railway, but no public commitments have been made, although this section is the only single-track section of the Rhine-Neckar S-Bahn network and has substantial traffic.
