= Neulußheim station =

Railway station in Neulußheim, Germany

Neulußheim
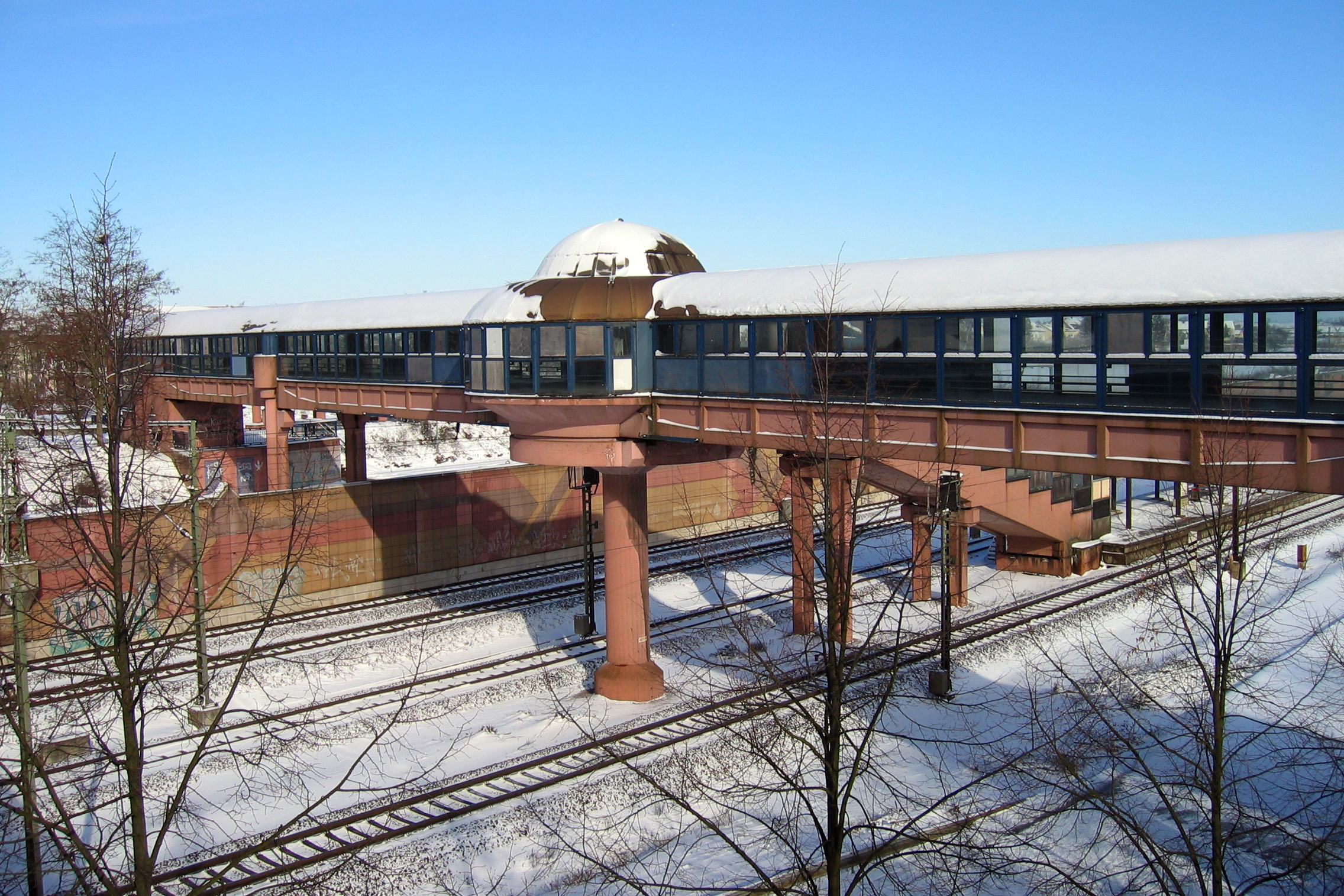
- Station with pedestrian overpass by Gottfried Böhm

General information
- Location: Bahnhofstraße 9, Neulußheim, Baden-Württemberg; Germany
- Coordinates: 49°17′31″N 8°31′49″E
- Line: Mannheim–Karlsruhe (km 24.5)
- Tracks: 2

Construction
- Accessible: Yes
- Architect: Gottfried Böhm; Wolfgang Pehnt

Other information
- Station code: 4414
- DS100 code: RNL
- IBNR: 8004414
- Category: 5
- Fare zone: VRN: 154 and 164
- Website: www.bahnhof.de

History
- Opened: 1986

Services
Preceding station	Rhine-Neckar S-Bahn	Following station
Waghäusel towards Karlsruhe Hbf	S9	Hockenheim towards Groß‑Rohrheim
Location

Neulußheim is the only station in the municipality of Neulußheim in the German state of Baden-Württemberg. It was re-built during the construction of the Mannheim–Stuttgart high-speed railway in 1986. It lies on the Rhine Railway and is classified by Deutsche Bahn (DB) as a category 5 station. Trains on the Mannheim–Stuttgart high-speed railway run next to the station without stopping.

== History ==
Neulußheim station was built during the construction of the Mannheim-Stuttgart high-speed railway in 1986, replacing an earlier station that was further west. The Rhine Railway (Karlsruhe–Mannheim) and the high-speed line have been bundled together in this area to reduce environmental impacts, as they have also been at the neighbouring Hockenheim station.

During the construction of the new high-speed line, the Rhine Railway was realigned for a length of 6.60 km (4.10 mi) between Hockenheim and Neulußheim. Between Hockenheim and Neulußheim the new line runs parallel with the old Karlsruhe–Mannheim line, which in this area was moved by approximately 120 metres (390 ft) to the east, and with Bundesstraße 36 (federal highway 36).

Architect Gottfried Böhm, a native of Offenbach, was commissioned for the construction of the new station in Neulußheim. Böhm is the only German architect to have received the prestigious Pritzker Architecture Prize. A new island platform was built on the Rhine Railway under his direction. However, since the new station was built to the east of the old line, a new pedestrian overpass or underpass had to be built to cross the new line. It was decided to build an overpass over the tracks of the two railway lines, which accordingly is very long with a length of 108 metres (354 ft). The construction lasted from 1984 to 1987. From 1986, with the assistance of the architect Wolfgang Pehnt, Böhm designed the station, which used the typical Böhm materials of concrete, steel and glass.

On 14 September 1986, the station was finally opened during the celebration of the 275th anniversary of the town.

Deutsche Bahn invested around €135,000 in the renovation of the bridge during 2010 and 2011 and the municipality spent about €50,000 on measures to improve the station environment. As part of the 2nd stage of the Rhine-Neckar S-Bahn, lifts were installed in the station up to 2015 to give it step-free access.
