= Graben-Neudorf =

- Municipality
- Flag Coat of arms

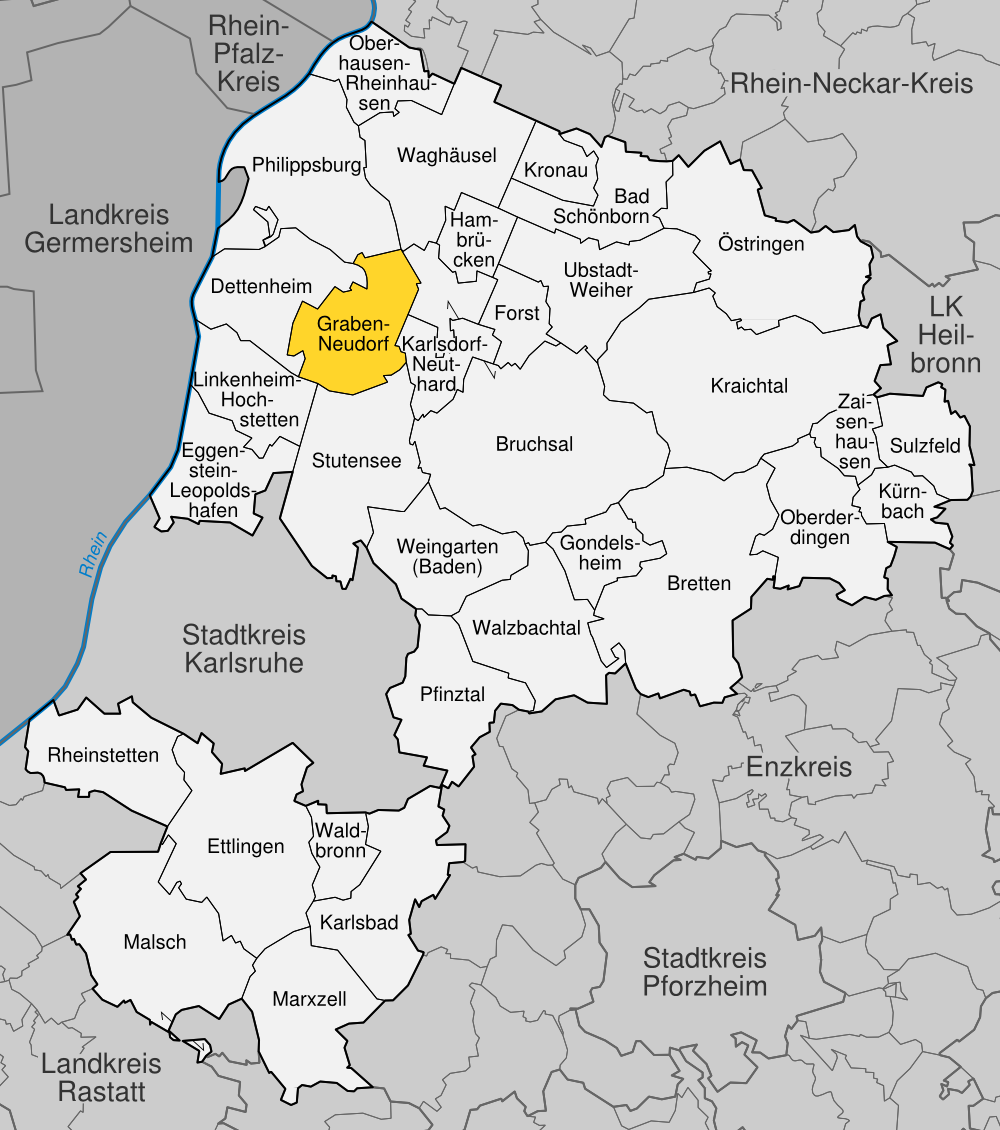
- Location of Graben-Neudorf within Karlsruhe district
- Interactive map of Graben-Neudorf
- Location within Germany Location within Baden-Württemberg
- Coordinates: 49°09′33″N 08°29′22″E
- Country: Germany
- State: Baden-Württemberg
- Admin. region: Karlsruhe
- District: Karlsruhe

Government
  - Mayor (2016–24): Christian Eheim

Area
  - Total: 28.80 km^{2} (11.12 sq mi)
- Elevation: 107 m (351 ft)

Population (2025-12-31)
  - Total: 12,496
  - Density: 433.9/km^{2} (1,124/sq mi)
- Time zone: UTC+01:00 (CET)
  - Summer (DST): UTC+02:00 (CEST)
- Postal codes: 76676
- Dialling codes: 07255
- Vehicle registration: KA
- Website: www.graben-neudorf.de

Graben-Neudorf is a municipality in Northern Karlsruhe district in Baden-Württemberg, Germany. It was created when the two communities of Graben and Neudorf were united on January 1, 1972. With this union Neudorf was transferred from the district of Bruchsal to the district of Karlsruhe. There is a public school in Graben-Neudorf run by the german government

== Geography ==
=== Geographical Location ===
Graben-Neudorf is a municipality in the district of Karlsruhe within Baden-Wüttemberg. It lies between Mannheim and Karlsruhe and between Bruchsal and Germersheim. It is approximately 20 and 45 km away from Karlsruhe and Mannheim, respectively, and 11 and 17 km away from Bruchsal and Germersheim, respectively.

=== Congregational structure ===
The municipality of Graben-Neudorf was composed from the formerly independent municipalities of Graben and Neudorf. The village of Graben belonged to the former municipality of Graben, and the village of Neudorf and the Graben-Neudorf and Johannisgrund train stations belonged to the former municipality of Neudorf. The deserted village of Hainhof also lay in the former municipalities of Graben and partially lay in the portion of Spöck, which is currently part of the city of Stuttensee.

== History ==
Graben-Neudorf is located north of the city of Karlsruhe

The village of Graben was probably created between the 5th and 7th century, though this isn't entirely certain. An ancient Roman road (partly visible to this day) connecting Kehl, Mühlburg, Heidelberg, and Neuenheim runs north/south through the Graben area. The discovery of Roman coins in the area suggest a Roman camp was located around the current site of the city.

The first documentary evidence of Graben only dates back to 1306. By the 14th and 15th century was Graben already a regional hub for trade as well as the church.

Graben came under the jurisdiction of the Margraviate of Baden in 1312. When the Margraviate of Baden was divided between brothers Bernhard III. and Ernst in 1535, Graben came under the Margraviate of Baden-Durlach. In 1771 when the Margraviate of Baden was reestablished Graben came under its jurisdiction.

In 1556, Margrave Charles II of Baden-Durlach introduced Lutheranism in the Margraviate of Baden-Durlach. He also moved his residence from Pforzheim to Durlach giving the Margraviate its name.

The wars of the 17th century brought great misery to Graben. The Thirty Years' War from 1618 to 1648 took a heavy toll. In 1622, Graben had 145 citizens, by 1648 there were only 42 citizens.

In the War of the Grand Alliance (1688-1697), the French destroyed Graben, so that only the church, city hall and some buildings remained. The inhabitants of the village were forced into the forests and in the surrounding area. Peace, order and prosperity did not return until the middle of the 18th century.

The village of Neudorf ("new village") resulted from merging two settlements, first noted in 1497 as "Nuwdorff".
