= Rhine Railway (Baden) =

Railway line in Germany

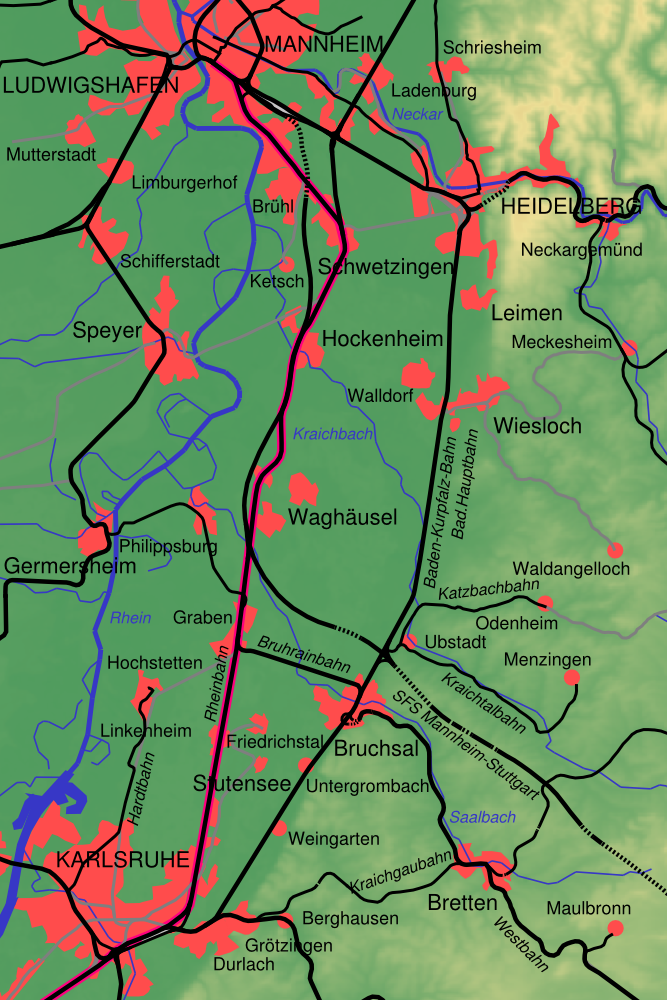
- Northern part

Overview
- Native name: Rheinbahn
- Line number: 4020 (Mannheim–Rastatt); 4242 (Rastatt–border)
- Locale: Baden-Württemberg, Germany; Alsace, France
- Termini: Mannheim; Haguenau

Service
- Route number: 700 (Mannheim–Karlsruhe); 702 (Karlsruhe–Rastatt); 710.4/41 (Karlsruhe Stadtbahn)

Technical
- Line length: formerly ca. 122 km (76 mi); now: 92.2 km (57.3 mi)
- Track gauge: 1,435 mm (4 ft 8 1/2 in) standard gauge
- Electrification: 15 kV/16.7 Hz AC overhead catenary (Mannheim–Rastatt:)
- Operating speed: 200 km/h (124.3 mph) (maximum)

The Rhine Railway (German: Rheinbahn) is a railway line in the German state of Baden-Württemberg, running from Mannheim via Karlsruhe to Rastatt, partly built as a strategic railway and formerly continuing to Haguenau in Alsace, now in France.

It was opened in 1870 as an alternative to the Baden Mainline and runs mostly broadly parallel with the Rhine Valley Railway, which runs from Mannheim to Heidelberg, Karlsruhe, Rastatt, Offenburg and Basel. The Rhine Railway originally ran from Graben-Neudorf to Karlsruhe via a more westerly route than the current route, which is now named the Hardt Railway and is partly used by lines S 1 and S 11 of the Karlsruhe Stadtbahn. In 1895 the current route was opened to Karlsruhe and extended to Rastatt and Haguenau. The section over the border along the Rhine in France was closed in 1966.

== Route ==
The line is entirely within the Upper Rhine Plain. Therefore, it is almost straight and has no major engineering structures. From Karlsruhe Central Station to Hagsfeld it runs within the independent city of Karlsruhe; from Blankenloch to Waghäusel it crosses the Karlsruhe district through the municipality of Neulußheim to the abandoned halt of Hirschacker in the Rhein-Neckar district. The rest of the line is located within the independent city of Mannheim. The line crosses a total of eight municipalities: Karlsruhe, Stutensee, Graben-Neudorf, Waghäusel, Neulußheim, Hockenheim, Oftersheim, Schwetzingen and Mannheim.

The geographical situation of the abandoned halt of Altrip, which was on the boundary of the city of Mannheim, is unusual; Altrip lies on the opposite side of the Rhine in the state of Rhineland-Palatinate, having been cut off by the straightening of the river, while the Rhine railway is exclusively located within Baden-Württemberg.

== History ==
=== 1870–1890: opening and first years ===
The Baden Mainline was opened in 1840 from Mannheim to Heidelberg and extended to Karlsruhe in 1844 and to Basel by 1855. However, the indirect route via Heidelberg bypassed part of the natural catchment area of Mannheim which was located close to the Rhine, including towns such as Schwetzingen and Hockenheim.

This led to a vigorous debate about the southern part of a proposed line from Mannheim to Karlsruhe close to the Rhine. The Grand Duke of Baden, Frederick I approved the building of a railway via Linkenheim, Eggenstein and Neureut to Mühlburger Tor (to the west of central Karlsruhe) and from there run on the Maxau Railway (Maxaubahn) to the old Karlsruhe central station (this route is now called the Hardt Railway, Hardtbahn), rather than a proposed route running further east to Karlsruhe on the current alignment. It was accepted that through traffic in the north-south direction might not run on the line and that it would instead continue to run on the Heidelberg–Karlsruhe line.

The construction of the Mannheim–Schwetzingen–Graben Neudorf–Eggenstein–Karlsruhe line via the Hardt forest was funded by the city of Mannheim. It was taken over by the Grand Duchy of Baden State Railway (Großherzogliche Badische Staatsbahn), on 4 August 1870, the day of its opening. The line was also known as the Rhine Railway, but there are also old maps that show it as the Rhine Valley Railway.

Shortly after the opening of the line in 1870, a problem became apparent during the Franco-Prussian War, in that military transports from Mannheim to Karlsruhe and continuing to the south had to reverse in Karlsruhe station. This led to the acceleration of the building of a curve between the Rhine Railway and the Rhine Valley Railway.

=== 1890–1945: development to the Second World War ===
As it was expected that there would soon be another war with France, plans were made to build strategic railways. Against this background, the German general staff demanded above all a line on the Graben-Neudorf–Blankenloch–Karlsruhe–Durmersheim–Rastatt–Roeschwoog–Haguenau route. This was inaugurated in 1895, including a freight rail bypass of Karlsruhe. Since the line via Blankenloch was shorter and more direct, trains on the Rhine Railway from then on ran on the strategic line.

The now bypassed Karlsruhe–Eggenstein–Graben-Neudorf section was subsequently called the Hardt Railway and converted into a connecting line. To continue a journey on the Hardt Railway towards Mannheim it was necessary to change trains in Graben-Neudorf.

After the completion of the line via Blankenloch, the Rhine Railway developed into a busy line for through traffic, especially since it was the shortest line between Mannheim and Karlsruhe, rather than the route via Bruchsal and Heidelberg. In addition, trains running via Heidelberg had to reverse there until 1955.

Passenger services across the Rhine ended in August 1938 and have not been restored except between May 1942 and December 1944. With the outbreak of the Second World War, the French army blew up the western end of the bridge over the Rhine at Wintersdorf on 12 October 1939, but it was rebuilt by the German army and reopened in May 1940. German troops destroyed the whole bridge on 12 December 1944.

=== 1945–2000 ===
The French military rebuilt the bridge at Wintersdorf and freight traffic resumed over the Rhine in May 1949, but the bridge was closed to rail traffic at the end of the Cold War.

In the 1950s the Rhine Railway was electrified, like all major lines in western Germany. In subsequent years, several stations that were no longer viable were abandoned. The section over the Rhine (and the border) into France was closed in 1966. The original western course of the line between Graben-Neudorf and Karlsruhe (the Hardt Railway) was closed in 1967.

The relief of the very heavily congested Hockenheim–Graben-Neudorf section of the Rhine Railway was included in the planning of the Mannheim–Stuttgart high-speed railway. At several points connections were provided to the existing line and a section of the old line was relocated. The Mannheim–Graben-Neudorf section was completed in 1987 as the first part of the new line and the Waghäusel Saalbach–Graben-Neudorf railway connected and reinforced the old and new lines.

The 21 km long section from Graben-Neudorf to Karlsruhe was upgraded from November 1987 as a connector between the Mannheim–Stuttgart high-speed line, which was opened over its full-length in 1991, and the Karlsruhe–Basel line; this work involved raising permitted speeds to 200 km/h and the elimination of nine level crossings.

Since then, long-distance trains have used the Rhine Railway on their way north from Graben-Neudorf. The passenger trains at this time mainly used Silberling carriages, hauled by class 141 electrics locomotives.

In 1997, Karlsruhe-Hagsfeld station, which had been disused since the 1980s, was reactivated in connection with the opening of the Karlsruhe–Blankenloch section of the Karlsruhe Stadtbahn. Since then, its serves as an interchange station between line S 2 of the Stadtbahn and regional line R 2, both managed by the Karlsruher Verkehrsverbund (Karlsruhe transport association).

=== 2000 to the present ===
Since 2000, the line has been served by Regional-Express services every two hours, running from Karlsruhe via Speyer, Ludwigshafen and Worms to Mainz. From Karlsruhe to Graben-Neudorf, the service runs on the Rhine railway. These services are operated with class 425 electric multiple units.

In 2015, the line was included in the network of the Rhine-Neckar S-Bahn. In 2004, some platforms were raised to serve class 425 S-Bahn sets. With the start of regular S-Bahn operations, all intermediate stations will be modernised and their platforms will be raised. New stations are to be built in Schwetzingen-Hirschacker, Schwetzingen Nord and Graben-Neudorf Süd.

A tram line was opened on the former track to Karlsruher Nordstadt in 2006.

== Timetable ==
The line is listed in the Deutsche Bahn timetable as line number 700. Traffic is very dense as many long-distance and freight trains use this route. Regional-Express services on the Karlsruhe–Mainz route make no intermediate stops between Graben-Neudorf and Karlsruhe.

Services between Mannheim and Karlsruhe are mainly operated as Regionalbahn services, which usually run half-hourly. Some Regional-Express services operate that stop in at least Graben-Neudorf, Waghäusel, Hockenheim and Schwetzingen.

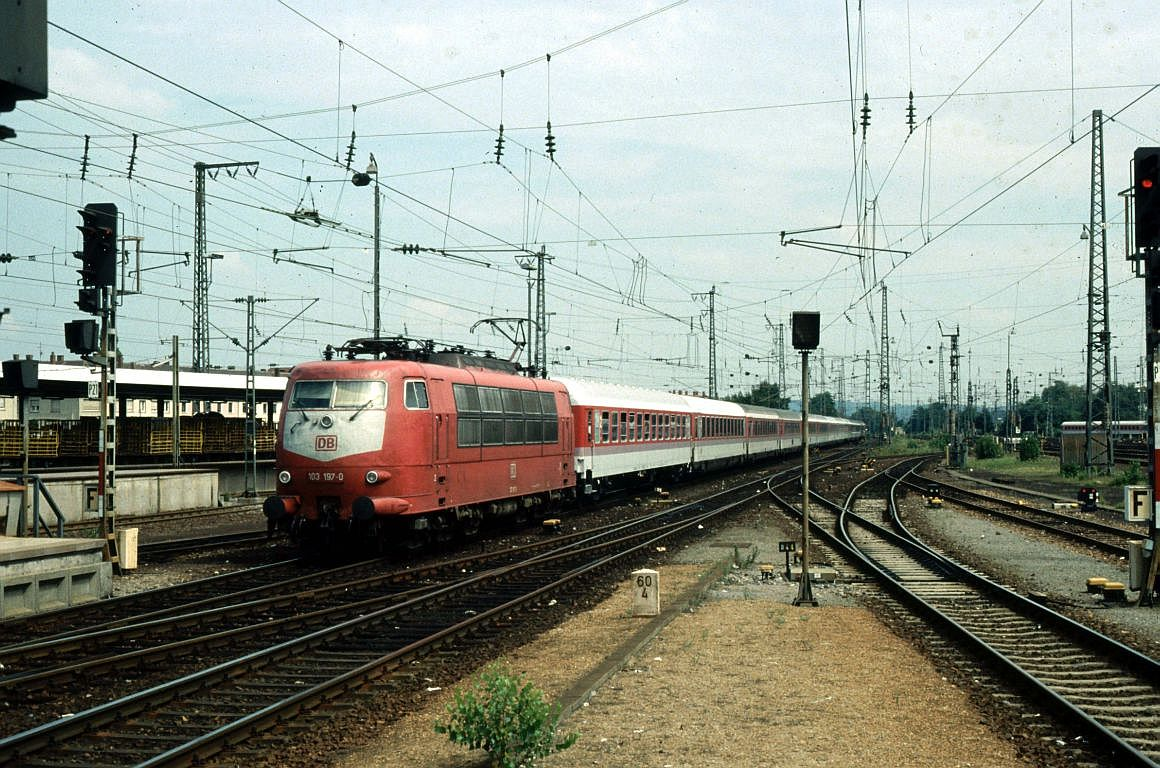
A EuroCity at the entrance to Karlsruhe Hauptbahnhof (August 1995)

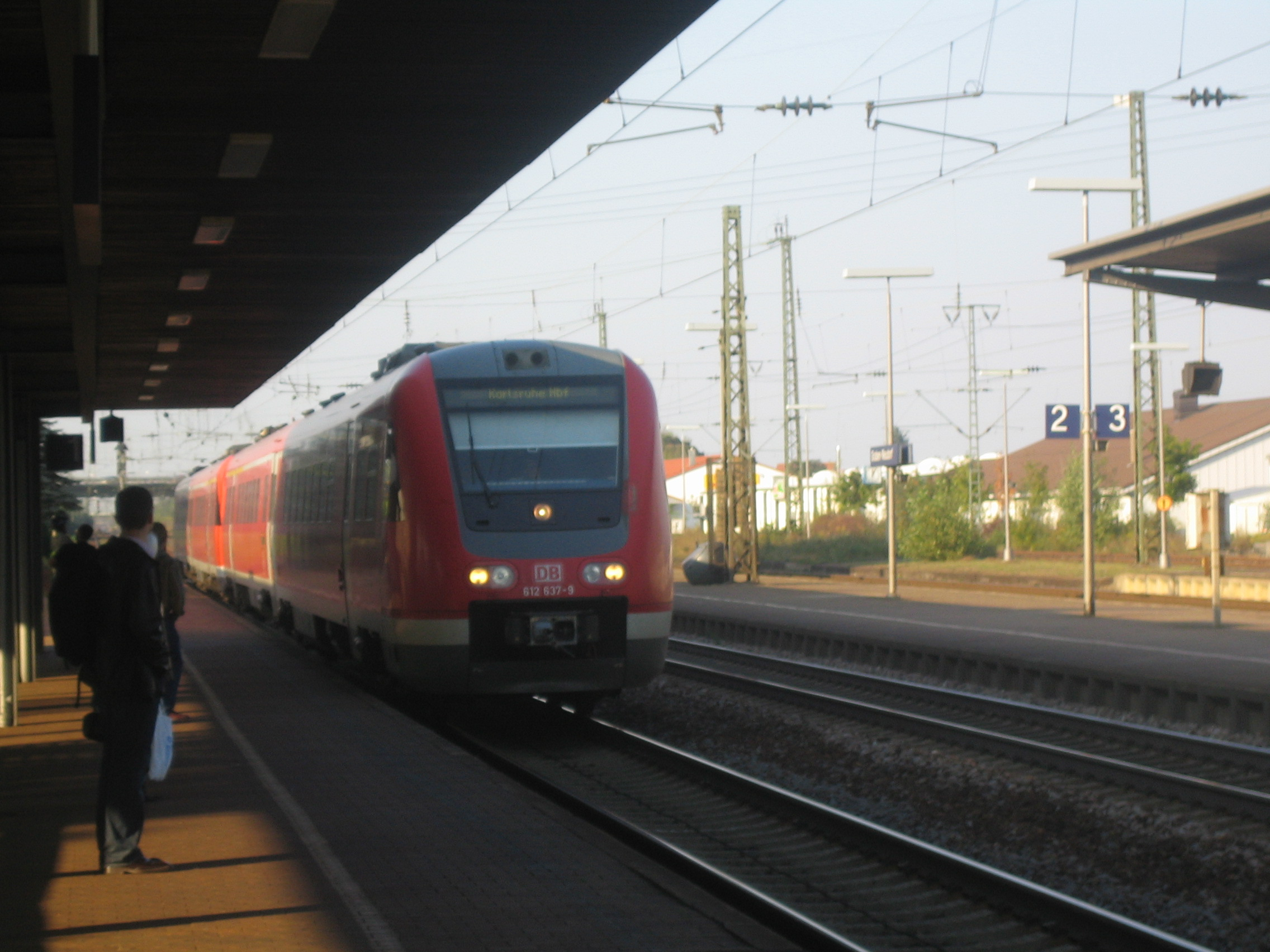
Regional-Express RE 4 on the Mainz–Karlsruhe route in Graben-Neudorf (September 2005)

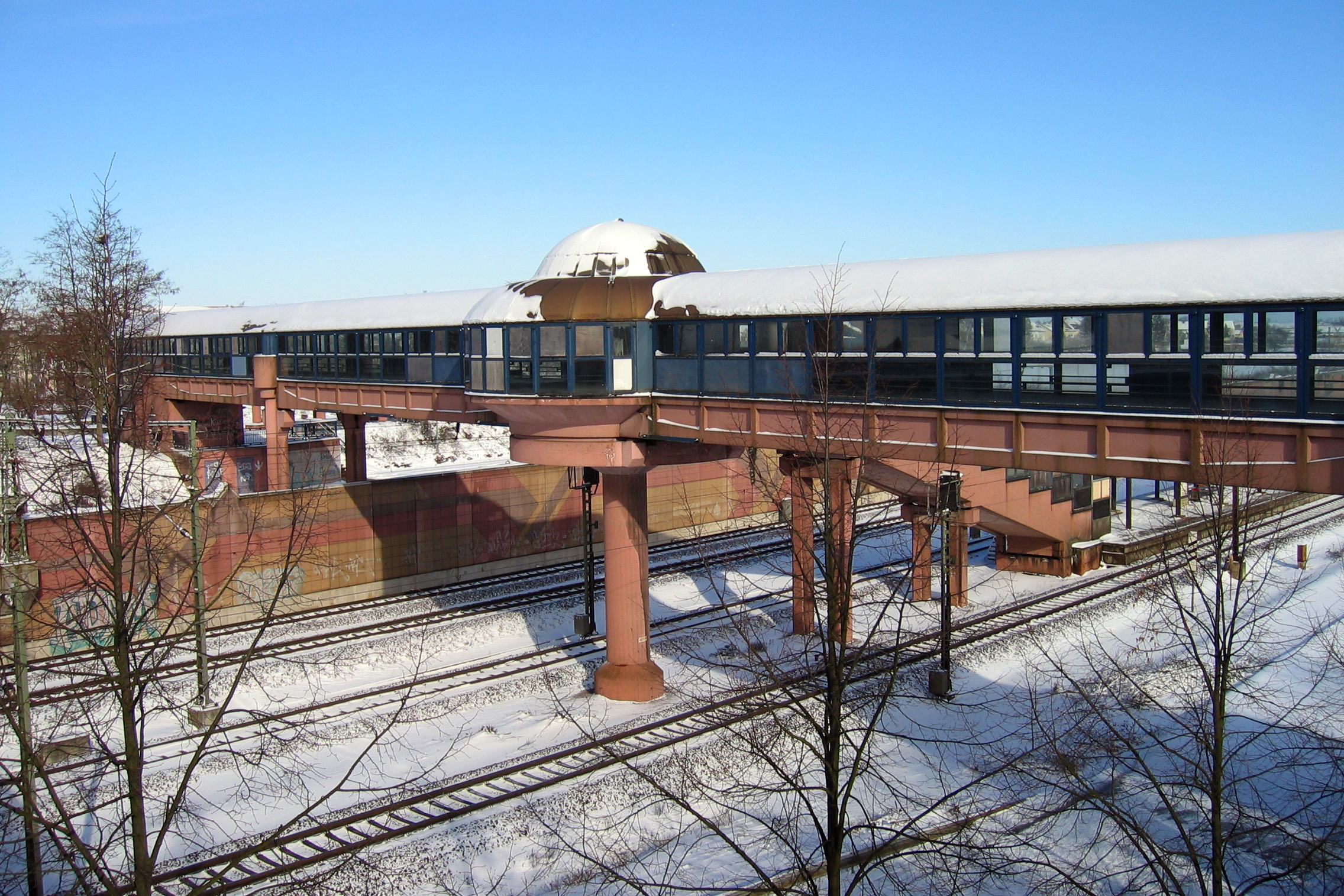
Overpass at Neulußheim station (Feb. 2004)

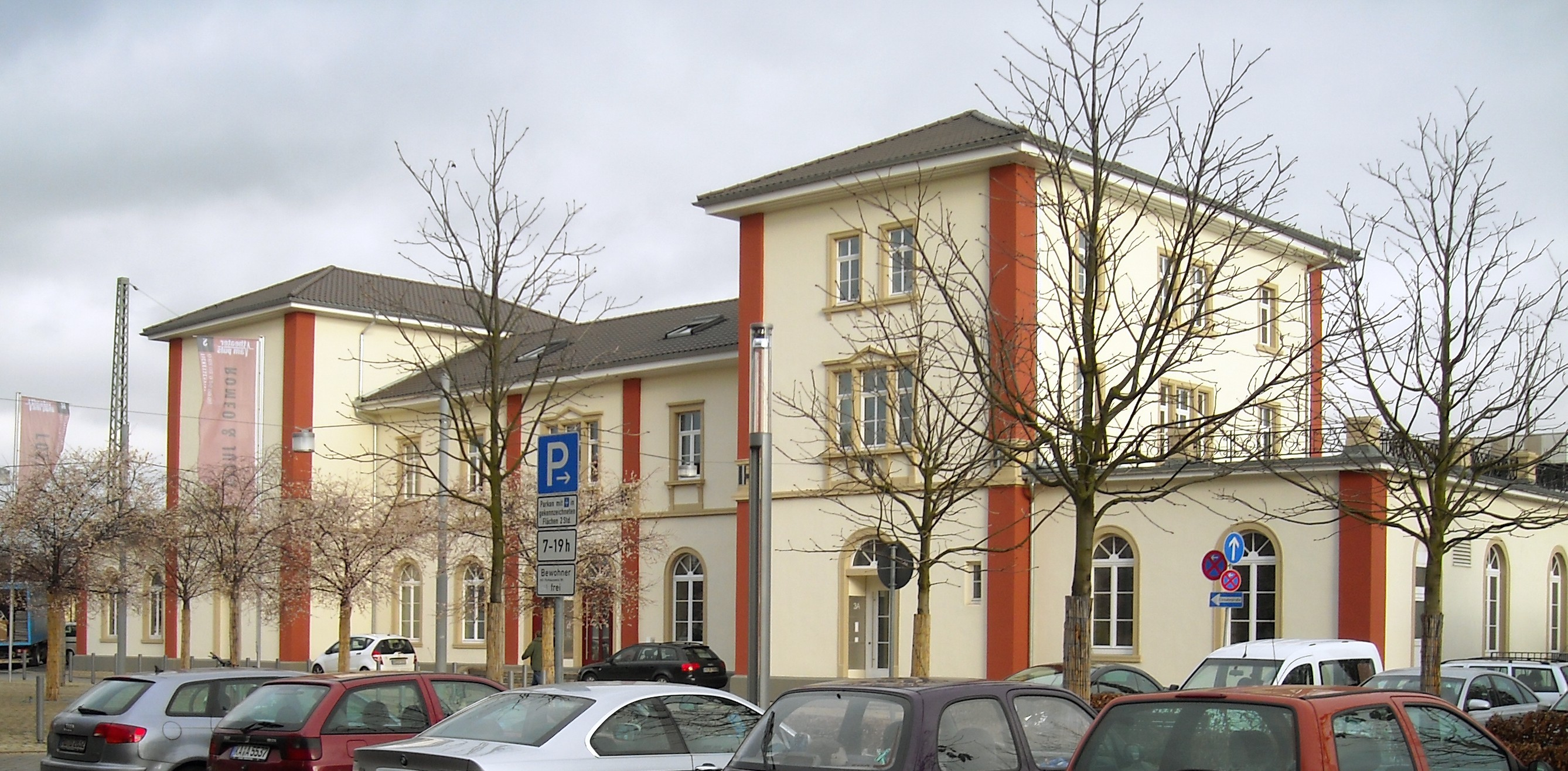
Schwetzingen station (December 2008)
