= List of cities in Rhineland-Palatinate by population =

The following list sorts all cities and communes in the German state of Rhineland-Palatinate with a population of more than 10,000. As of December 31, 2025, 47 cities fulfill this criterion and are listed here. This list refers only to the population of individual municipalities within their defined limits, which does not include other municipalities or suburban areas within urban agglomerations.

== List ==
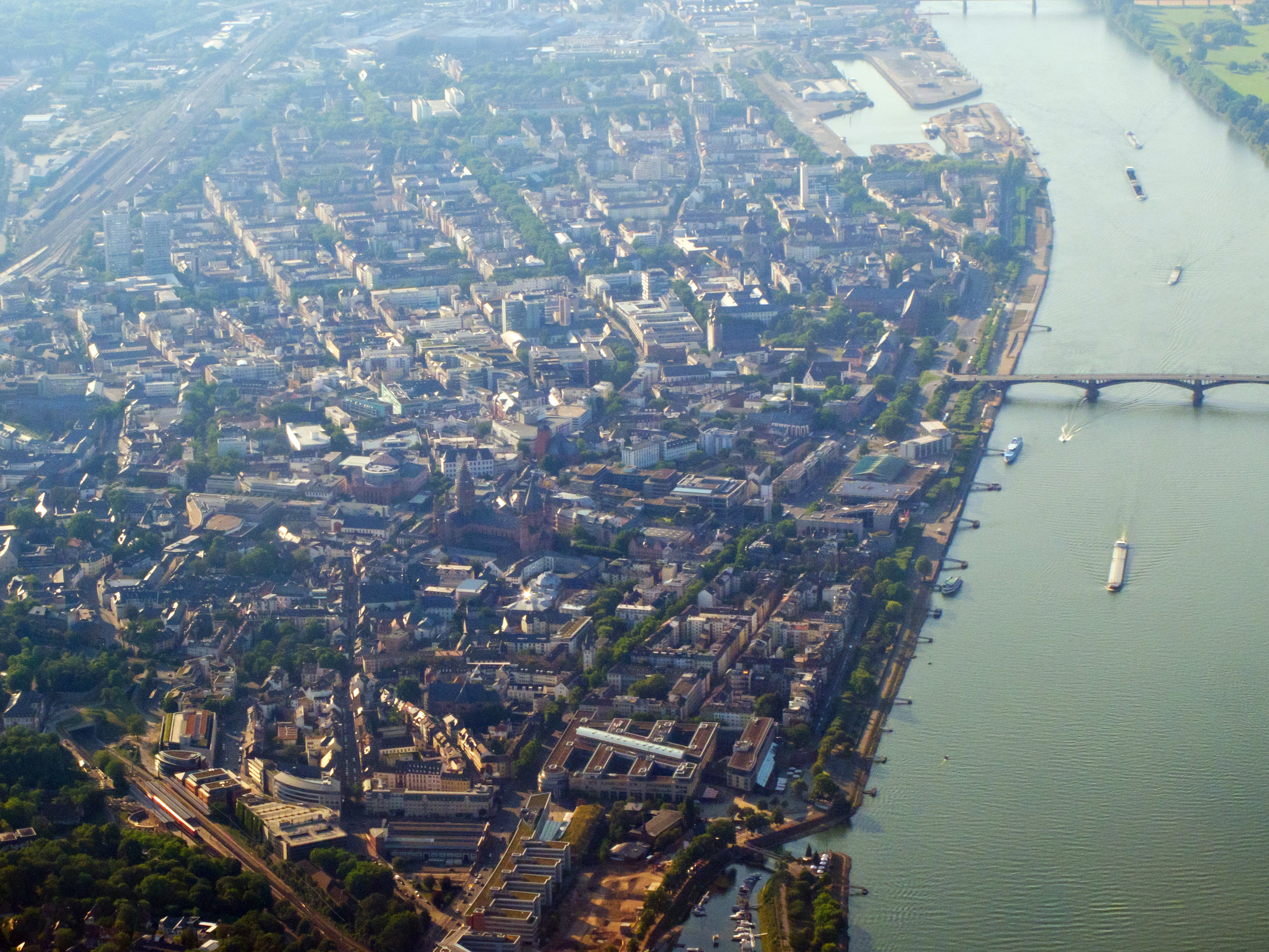
Mainz

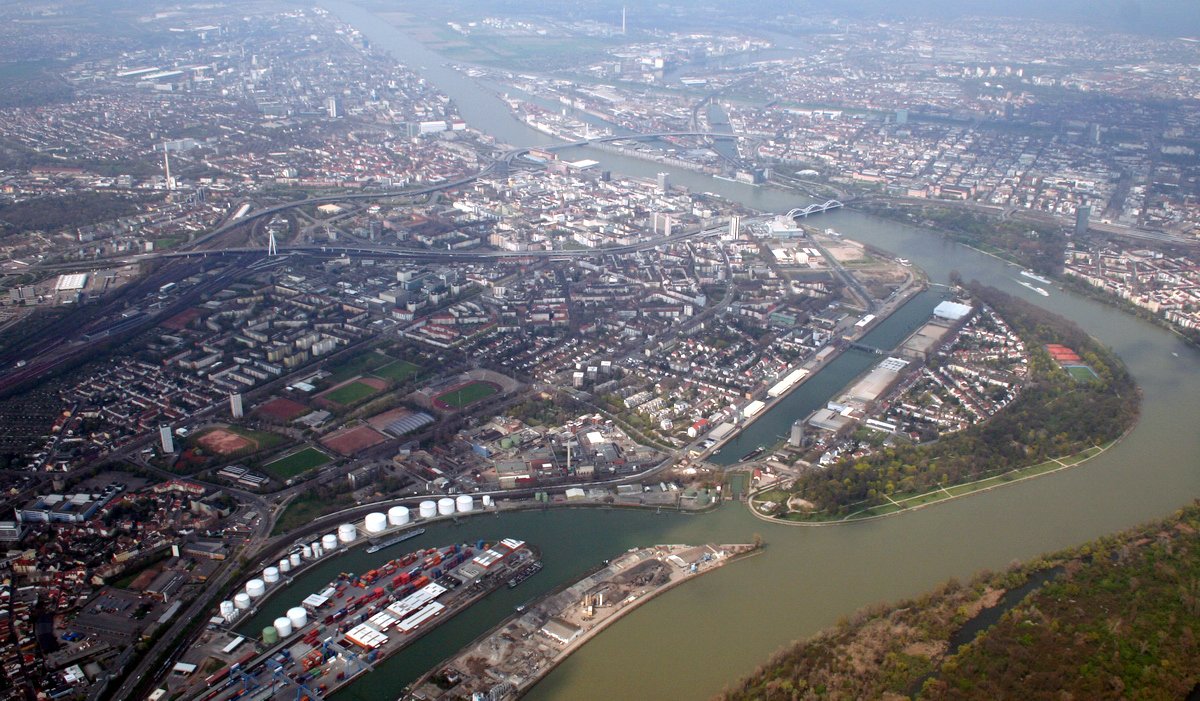
Ludwigshafen am Rhein

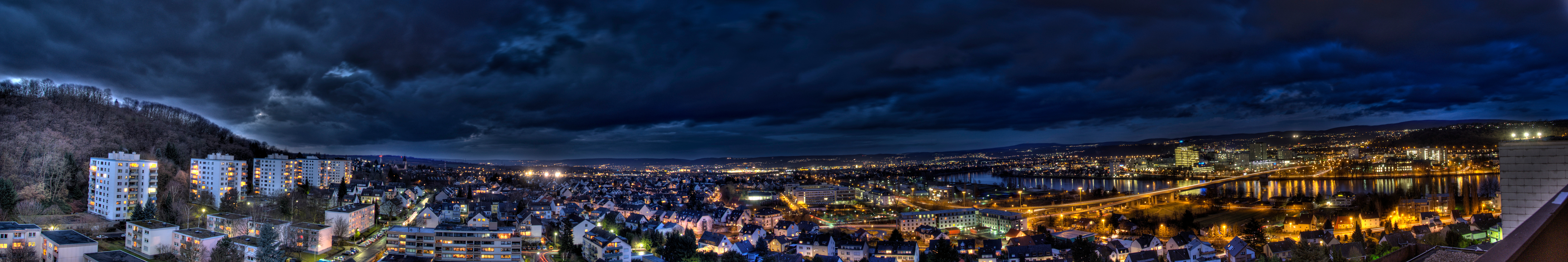
Koblenz

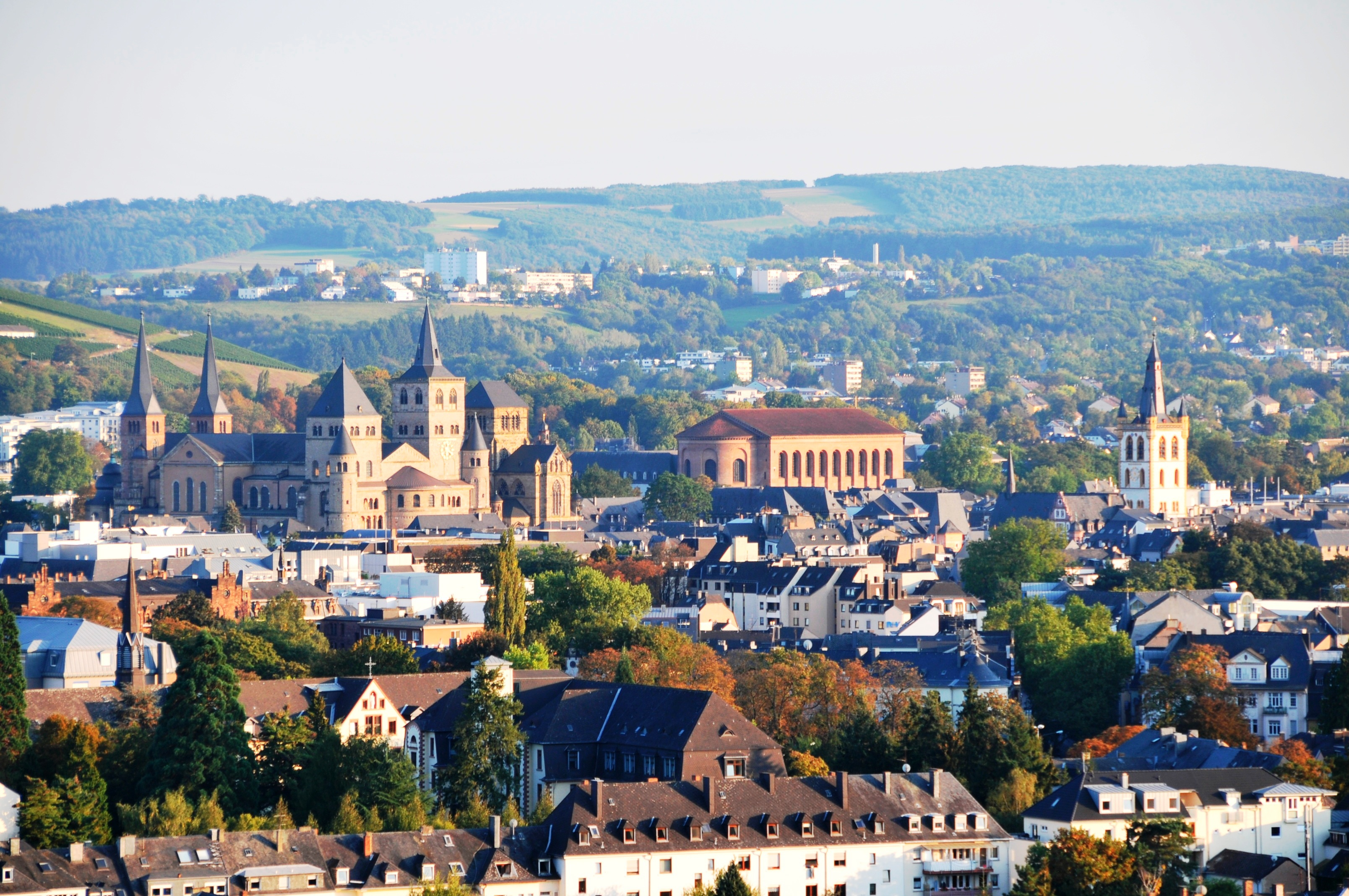
Trier

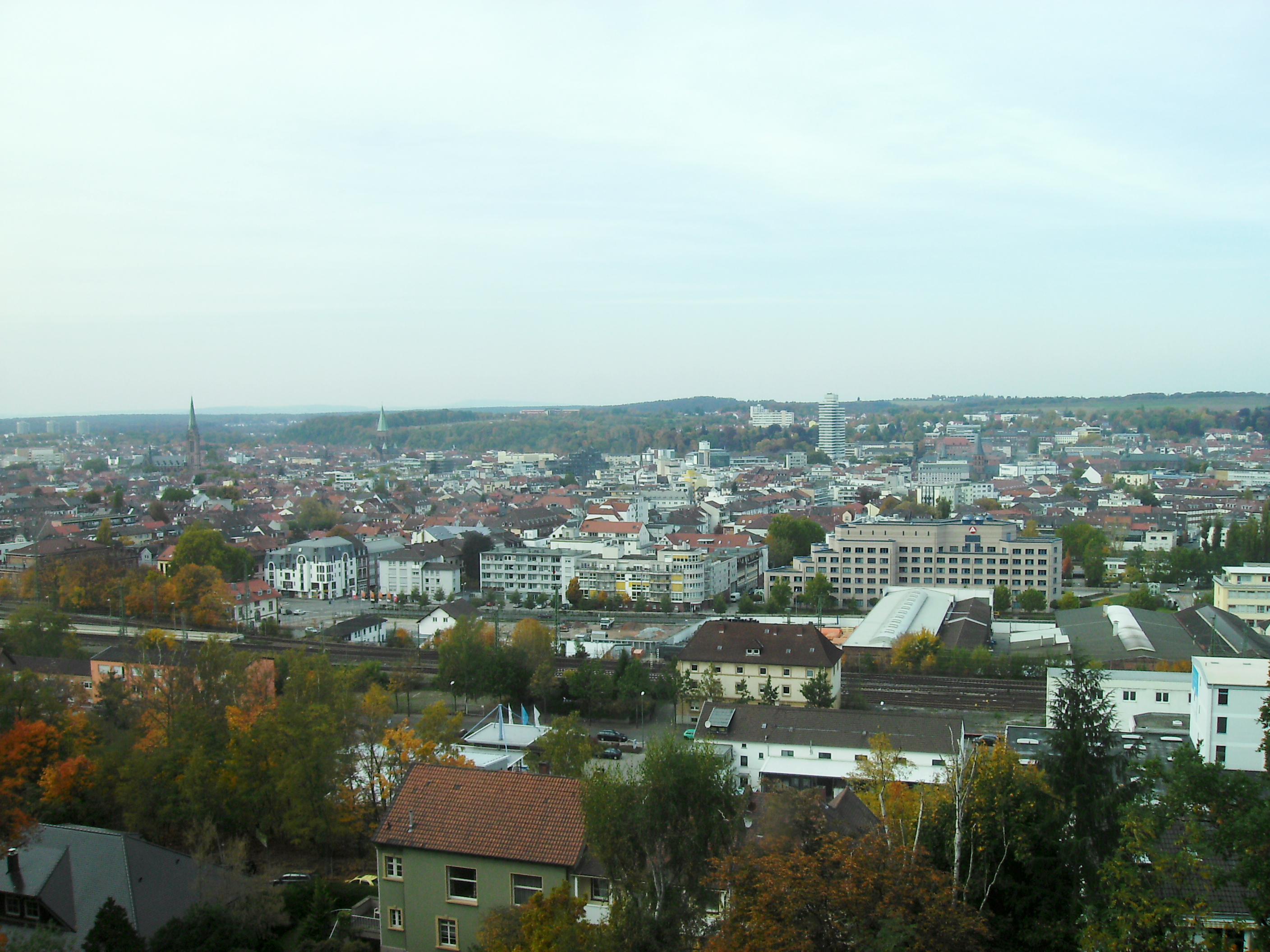
Kaiserslautern

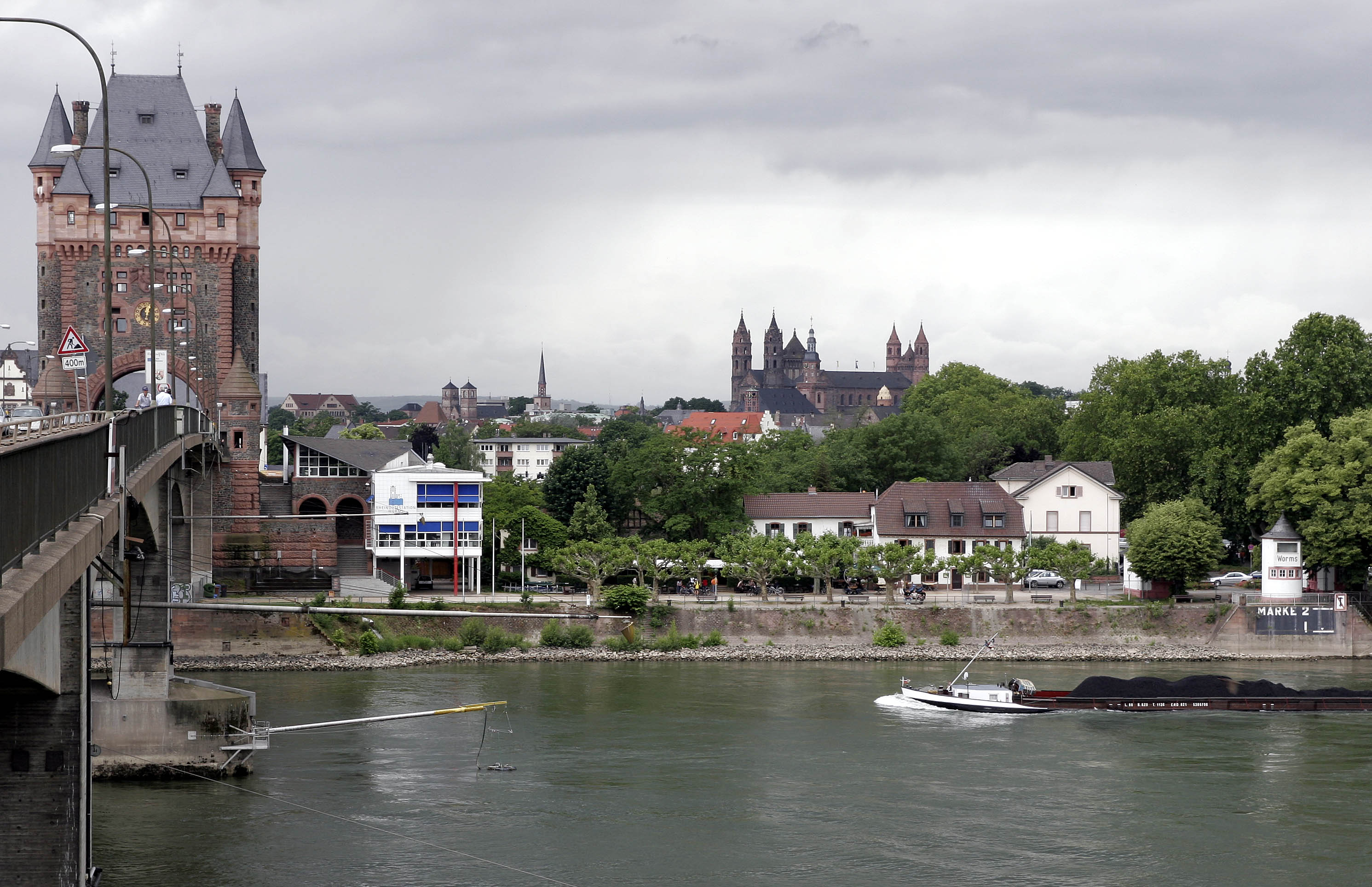
Worms

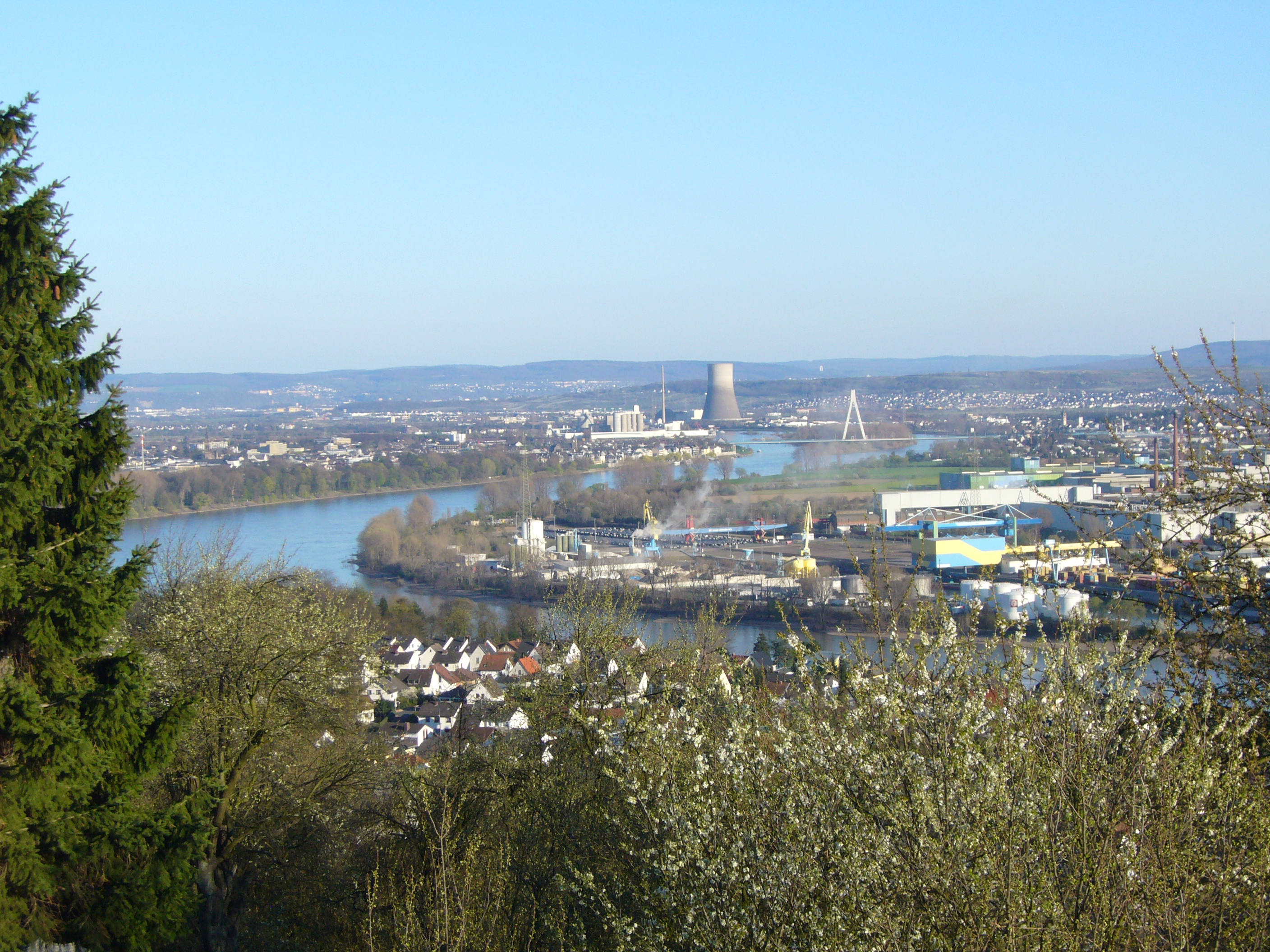
Neuwied

The following table lists the 47 cities or communes in Rhineland-Palatinate with a population of at least 10,000 on December 31, 2025, as estimated by the Federal Statistical Office of Germany. A city is displayed in bold if it is a state or federal capital.

1. The city rank by population as of December 31, 2024, as estimated by the Federal Statistical Office of German
2. The city name
3. The name of the district (Landkreis) in which the city lies (some cities are districts on their own called urban districts)
4. The city population as of May 15, 2022, as enumerated by the 2022 German census
5. The city population as of May 9, 2011, as enumerated by the 2011 European Union census
6. The city land area as of December 31, 2025
7. The city population density as of December 31, 2025 (residents per unit of land area)

2025 rank	City	District	2025 estimate	2022 census	2011 census	2025 land area	2025 pop. density
1	**Mainz**	urban district	224,684	220,386	200,344	97.7 km^{2}	2,299/km^{2}
2	Ludwigshafen am Rhein	urban district	177,222	172,889	157,584	77.4 km^{2}	2,289/km^{2}
3	Koblenz	urban district	113,378	112,963	107,825	105 km^{2}	1,077/km^{2}
4	Trier	urban district	104,342	102,727	105,671	117 km^{2}	891.4/km^{2}
5	Kaiserslautern	urban district	100,426	99,689	96,340	140 km^{2}	718.9/km^{2}
6	Worms	urban district	86,753	84,986	79,207	109 km^{2}	797.9/km^{2}
7	Neuwied	Neuwied	67,083	66,125	64,144	86.5 km^{2}	775.5/km^{2}
8	Bad Kreuznach	Bad Kreuznach	54,168	53,062	43,244	55.6 km^{2}	974.9/km^{2}
9	Neustadt an der Weinstraße	urban district	52,945	52,778	52,164	117 km^{2}	452.2/km^{2}
10	Speyer	urban district	49,564	49,482	49,540	42.7 km^{2}	1,160/km^{2}
11	Landau in der Pfalz	urban district	48,209	47,072	43,361	82.9 km^{2}	581.3/km^{2}
12	Frankenthal (Pfalz)	urban district	48,140	47,992	46,415	43.9 km^{2}	1,097/km^{2}
13	Pirmasens	urban district	39,761	38,936	40,887	61.4 km^{2}	648.1/km^{2}
14	Ingelheim am Rhein	Mainz-Bingen	35,016	34,754	33,732	73.3 km^{2}	477.6/km^{2}
15	Zweibrücken	urban district	33,323	33,141	34,200	70.6 km^{2}	471.7/km^{2}
16	Idar-Oberstein	Birkenfeld	30,170	29,753	29,073	91.6 km^{2}	329.4/km^{2}
17	Andernach	Mayen-Koblenz	30,039	29,995	29,151	53.3 km^{2}	563.2/km^{2}
18	Bad Neuenahr-Ahrweiler	Ahrweiler	27,961	25,930	29,073	63.4 km^{2}	442.1/km^{2}
19	Bingen am Rhein	Mainz-Bingen	25,384	24,802	23,812	37.7 km^{2}	673.7/km^{2}
20	Germersheim	Germersheim	21,715	21,465	19,803	21.7 km^{2}	1,002/km^{2}
21	Schifferstadt	Rhein-Pfalz-Kreis	21,387	21,221	18,764	28.1 km^{2}	762.2/km^{2}
22	Haßloch	Bad Dürkheim	20,396	20,301	19,802	40.0 km^{2}	510.5/km^{2}
23	Mayen	Mayen-Koblenz	19,713	19,288	18,607	58.2 km^{2}	338.8/km^{2}
24	Alzey	Alzey-Worms	19,468	19,035	17,531	35.2 km^{2}	552.8/km^{2}
25	Bad Dürkheim	Bad Dürkheim	19,159	19,020	18,219	103 km^{2}	186.8/km^{2}
26	Wittlich	Bernkastel-Wittlich	19,049	18,751	18,237	49.6 km^{2}	383.7/km^{2}
27	Lahnstein	Rhein-Lahn-Kreis	18,719	18,299	17,726	37.6 km^{2}	497.6/km^{2}
28	Wörth am Rhein	Germersheim	18,387	18,558	17,289	132 km^{2}	139.7/km^{2}
29	Konz	Trier-Saarburg	18,121	17,999	17,561	44.6 km^{2}	406.6/km^{2}
30	Bendorf	Mayen-Koblenz	17,726	17,581	16,589	24.1 km^{2}	734.9/km^{2}
31	Remagen	Ahrweiler	17,603	17,719	15,835	33.2 km^{2}	530.1/km^{2}
32	Sinzig	Ahrweiler	17,256	17,272	17,073	41.1 km^{2}	419.9/km^{2}
33	Boppard	Rhein-Hunsrück-Kreis	15,771	15,769	15,413	74.9 km^{2}	210.6/km^{2}
34	Bitburg	Bitburg-Prüm	15,554	15,405	13,295	47.5 km^{2}	327.1/km^{2}
35	Montabaur	Westerwaldkreis	14,884	14,601	12,503	33.8 km^{2}	440.7/km^{2}
36	Grünstadt	Bad Dürkheim	14,419	14,180	12,849	18.1 km^{2}	797.1/km^{2}
37	Mutterstadt	Rhein-Pfalz-Kreis	13,403	13,203	12,392	20.5 km^{2}	654.8/km^{2}
38	Limburgerhof	Rhein-Pfalz-Kreis	11,684	11,551	10,776	9.0 km^{2}	1,298/km^{2}
39	Diez	Rhein-Lahn-Kreis	11,428	11,167	10,862	12.4 km^{2}	920.9/km^{2}
40	Mülheim-Kärlich	Mayen-Koblenz	11,159	11,135	10,691	16.4 km^{2}	679.6/km^{2}
41	Herxheim bei Landau/Pfalz	Südliche Weinstraße	11,093	10,856	10,311	29.1 km^{2}	380.8/km^{2}
42	Grafschaft, Rhineland	Ahrweiler	10,817	11,067	10,798	57.6 km^{2}	187.8/km^{2}
43	Böhl-Iggelheim	Rhein-Pfalz-Kreis	10,645	10,460	10,173	32.8 km^{2}	324.2/km^{2}
44	Morbach	Bernkastel-Wittlich	10,542	10,582	10,532	122 km^{2}	86.2/km^{2}
45	Betzdorf	Altenkirchen	10,363	10,142	10,058	9.6 km^{2}	1,084/km^{2}
46	Bobenheim-Roxheim	Rhein-Pfalz-Kreis	10,045	9,949	9,832	20.5 km^{2}	489.8/km
47	Bad Ems	Rhein-Lahn-Kreis	10,030	9,914	8,979	15.4 km^{2}	650.9/km
