= Schifferstadt station =

Separation station in Schifferstadt, Rhineland-Palatinate, Germany

Schifferstadt
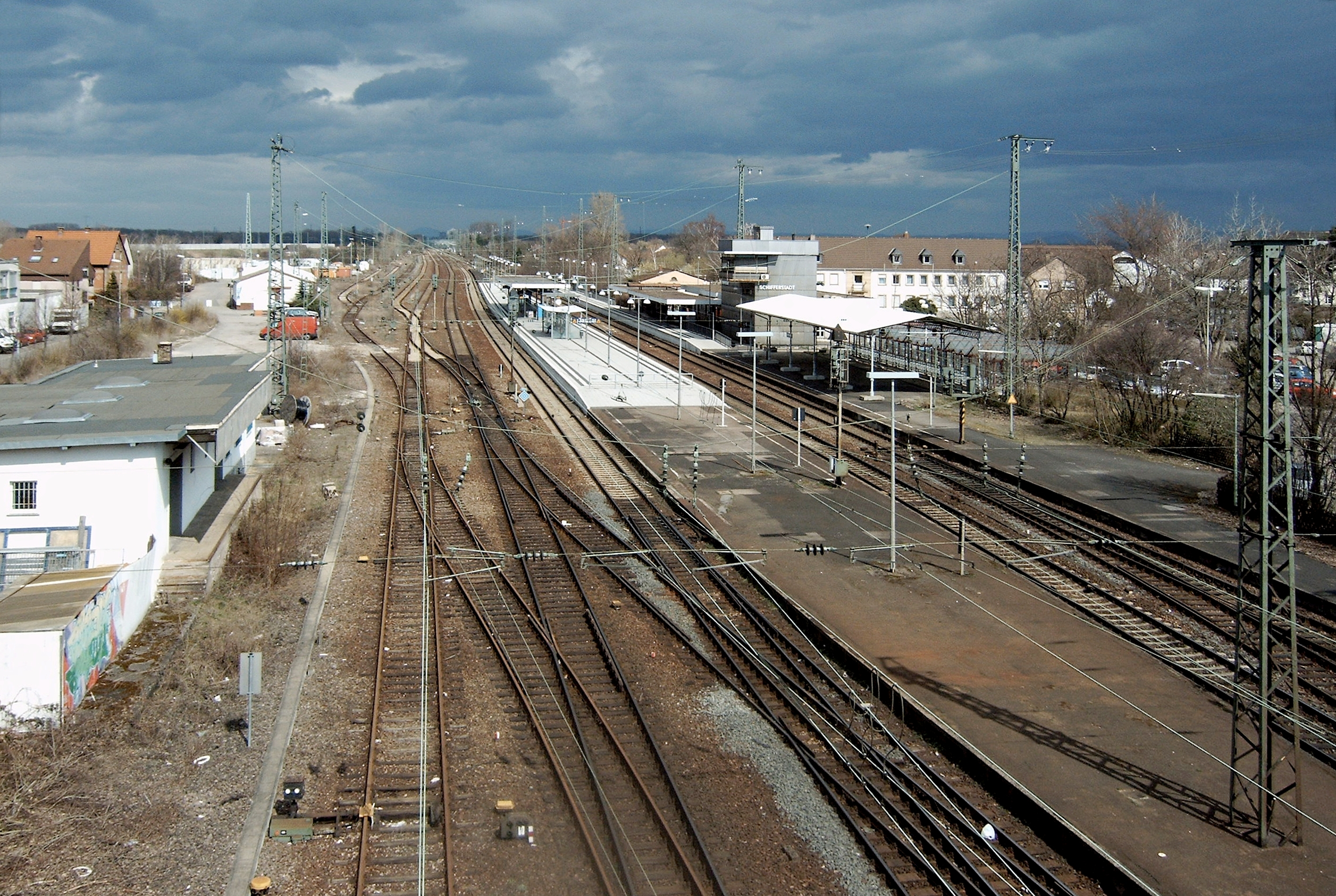

General information
- Location: Bahnhofstr. 87, Schifferstadt, Rhineland-Palatinate; Germany
- Coordinates: 49°23′31″N 8°21′52″E
- Owner: Deutsche Bahn
- Operator: DB Netz; DB Station&Service
- Lines: Ludwigshafen-Saarbrücken (KBS 670); Schifferstadt–Wörth (KBS 677)
- Platforms: 3

Construction
- Accessible: Yes

Other information
- Station code: 5567
- DS100 code: RSD
- IBNR: 8000254
- Category: 3
- Fare zone: VRN: 123
- Website: www.bahnhof.de

History
- Opened: 11 June 1847

Services
Preceding station	DB Regio Mitte	Following station
Böhl-Iggelheim towards Koblenz Hbf	RE 1 RE 4126 only	Ludwigshafen (Rhein) Mitte towards Heidelberg Hbf
Ludwigshafen Hbf towards Frankfurt (Main) Hbf	RE 4	Speyer Hbf towards Karlsruhe Hbf
Preceding station	Rhine-Neckar S-Bahn	Following station
Böhl-Iggelheim towards Homburg (Saar) Hbf	S1	Limburgerhof towards Osterburken
Böhl-Iggelheim towards Kaiserslautern Hbf	S2	Limburgerhof towards Mosbach (Baden)
Schifferstadt Süd towards Germersheim	S3	Limburgerhof towards Karlsruhe Hbf
Schifferstadt Süd towards Ludwigshafen (Rhein) BASF Nord	S4	Limburgerhof towards Ludwigshafen (Rhein) Hbf
Location

Schifferstadt station is a separation station in the town of Schifferstadt in the German state of Rhineland-Palatinate, where the Speyer line branches off from the Mannheim–Saarbrücken railway.

== History ==
The station is on the first section of the Palatine Ludwig Railway (Mannheim–Saarbrücken railway), inaugurated between Neustadt and Ludwigshafen in 1847. The line from Speyer and Germersheim was opened in the same year. Since 12 March 1964, electric trains have run through Schifferstadt.

With the opening of the Rhine-Neckar S-Bahn, the station became a junction of the Rhine-Neckar network, with S-Bahn lines S1 and S2 (towards Kaiserslautern) and lines S3 and S4 (towards Germersheim) separating there. In the evenings Schifferstadt station is also a terminus of some S-Bahn trains.

== Station facilities ==
The station building houses a signal box, a ticket office and a kiosk. In the station area there are also telephone booths, bicycle parking, and a park and ride parking area. In addition the riot police (Bereitschaftspolizei) of Rhineland-Palatinate are also established at the station. The station has an outside platform (platform 1) and a central platform (platform tracks 2 and 3).

== Rail services ==
Schifferstadt station is served by only one regional transport service, the Regional-Express service (RE 4) from Karlsruhe to Mainz. The remaining local services are operated by the Rhine-Neckar S-Bahn. It was formerly served each day by a pair of intercity train (IC) services operate from Karlsruhe to Frankfurt and back, but these now run through without stopping.

=== Regional services ===
Line	Route	Frequency
RE 1	Koblenz – Trier – Saarbrücken – Homburg (Saar) – Neustadt (Weinstr) – Schifferstadt – Ludwigshafen (Rhein) Mitte – Mannheim	One service
RE 4	Frankfurt – Hochheim – Mainz – Worms – Frankenthal – Ludwigshafen – Schifferstadt – Speyer – Germersheim – Graben-Neudorf – Karlsruhe	120 min

=== Rhine-Neckar S-Bahn ===
Line	Route	Frequency
S1	Homburg - Kaiserslautern – Neustadt – Schifferstadt – Ludwigshafen – Mannheim – Heidelberg – Mosbach – Osterburken	Hourly
S2	Kaiserslautern – Neustadt – Schifferstadt – Ludwigshafen – Mannheim – Heidelberg – Mosbach	Hourly
S3	Germersheim - Speyer – Schifferstadt – Ludwigshafen – Mannheim – Heidelberg – Bruchsal – Karlsruhe	Hourly
S4	Germersheim - Speyer – Schifferstadt – Ludwigshafen – Mannheim – Heidelberg – Bruchsal	Individual services
