= Limburgerhof station =

Railway station in Limburgerhof, Germany

Limburgerhof
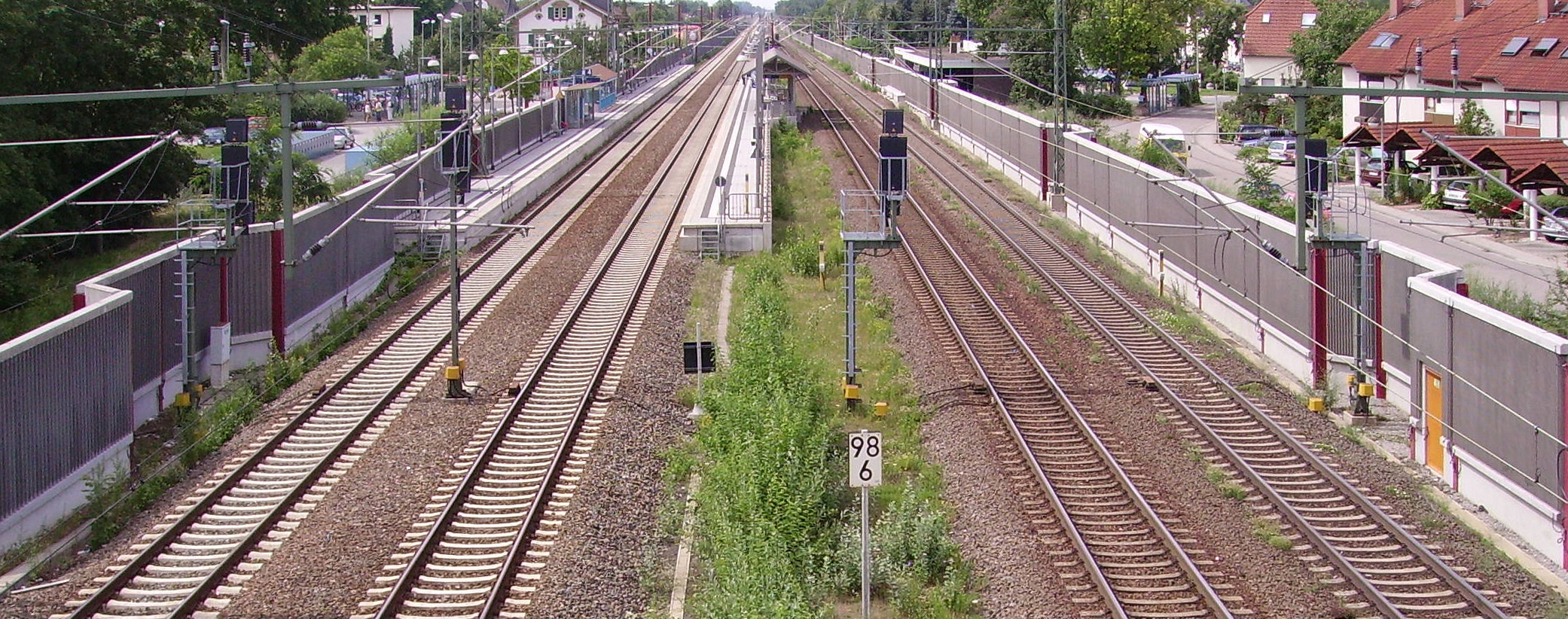
- Limburgerhof station in July 2007 (left in the picture) with the original entrance building in the background; on the right are the long-distance tracks and the current entrance building

General information
- Location: Am Bahnhofplatz 1, Limburgerhof, Rhineland-Palatinate; Germany
- Coordinates: 49°25′27″N 8°23′26″E
- Lines: Mannheim–Saarbrücken (km 98.5) (KBS 665.1/665.2/670)
- Platforms: 2

Construction
- Accessible: Yes
- Architectural style: Neoclassical

Other information
- Station code: 3721
- DS100 code: RLI
- IBNR: 8003687
- Category: 4
- Fare zone: VRN: 123
- Website: www.bahnhof.de

History
- Opened: 11 June 1847
- Former names: Mutterstadt

Services
| Preceding station | Rhine-Neckar S-Bahn | Following station |
|---|---|---|
| Schifferstadt towards Homburg (Saar) Hbf | S1 | Ludwigshafen-Rheingönheim towards Osterburken |
| Schifferstadt towards Kaiserslautern Hbf | S2 | Ludwigshafen-Rheingönheim towards Mosbach (Baden) |
| Schifferstadt towards Germersheim | S3 | Ludwigshafen-Rheingönheim towards Karlsruhe Hbf |
| Schifferstadt towards Ludwigshafen (Rhein) BASF Nord | S4 | Ludwigshafen-Rheingönheim towards Ludwigshafen (Rhein) Hbf |
Location
- Location within Rhineland-Palatinate

Limburgerhof station – called Mutterstadt until 1930 – is in the town of Limburgerhof in the German state of Rhineland-Palatinate. Deutsche Bahn classifies it as a category 4 station and it has two platform tracks and two through tracks. The station is located in the network of the Verkehrsverbund Rhein-Neckar (Rhine-Neckar transport association, VRN) and belongs to fare zone 123. Its address is Am Bahnhofsplatz 1.

It is located on the Mannheim–Saarbrücken railway, which essentially consists of the Palatine Ludwig Railway (Pfälzische Ludwigsbahn, Ludwigshafen–Bexbach). It was opened on 11 June 1847, when the Ludwigshafen–Neustadt section of the Ludwig Railway was put into full operation under the name of Mutterstadt, since it originally served the municipality of Mutterstadt. Its present name was given to it because the settlement of Limburgerhof was established in the area from 1900; this was raised to an independent municipality on 1 January 1930.

In the meantime, it was rebuilt as a halt. Since December 2003, it has been served by lines S1 and S2 of the Rhine-Neckar S-Bahn. Its former entrance building is heritage listed.

== Location ==
The station is located in the northern part of the built-up area of Limburgerhof. The Mannheim–Saarbrücken railway runs through this area directly from northeast to southwest. In its west is the street of Bahnhofsplatz (station forecourt), in the east is Speyerer Straße. The station has bicycle parking, a store for travel supplies and barrier-free access.

== History ==
=== Railway initiatives around Mutterstadt ===
Originally it had been planned to build a railway running north–south in the then Bavarian Circle of the Rhine (Rheinkreis). However, it was agreed to first build a railway running east–west, which was to be used primarily for transporting coal from the Saar district (now part of the Saarland) to the Rhine.

At first, however, it was unclear whether this would run through the area of the municipality of Mutterstadt. Speyer, the capital of the Palatinate, fought to become the eastern terminus of the route. It was argued essentially that the cathedral city was an old trading town, whereas Rheinschanze, which was alternatively proposed as the end of the line, would only serve the transit of goods as it was merely a military base. However, these endeavours did not succeed as the main focus of attention was on the Rhine-Neckar region—especially on Mannheim—and the export of coal to the area on the other side of the Rhine was regarded as more important.

Two options were discussed for the general route through Kaiserslautern, as the development of a route through the Palatinate Forest (Pfälzerwald) proved to be complicated. At first the responsible engineers considered a route through the Dürkheim valley. However, this proved impractical because its side valleys were too low, and above all the climb to Frankenstein would have been too steep. This would have required stationary steam engines and rope haulage to overcome the differences in altitude.

Originally, the line would have run along the southern edge of the village, but the municipality of Mutterstadt decided that the route should run in the extreme east of its territory at the time. As a result, no station was planned for the municipality. It was not until later that it was agreed to build a station in Mutterstadt.

=== Further development (1847–1945) ===
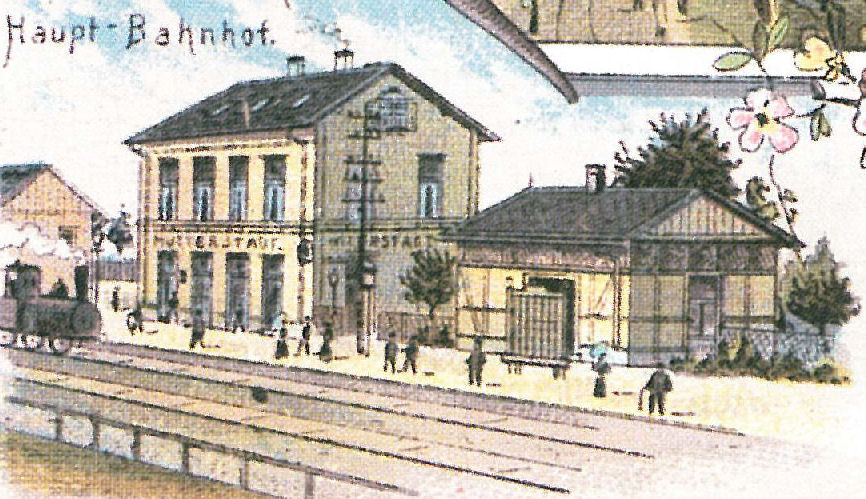
Mutterstadt station in 1900

The station was opened with the Ludwigshafen–Neustadt section of the Ludwig Railway on 11 June 1847. Because the stations in Rheingönheim and Mundenheim were not opened until a few decades later, it was the second last station from the west before the terminus in Ludwigshafen. Mutterstadt was connected from 1890 to the narrow-gauge Ludwigshafen–Dannstadt railway; for this reason, the station on the Ludwigsbahn was unofficially often referred to as Mutterstadt Hauptbahnhof.

In 1922, the station was integrated into the newly founded Reichsbahndirektion (Reichsbahn railway division) of Ludwigshafen. Starting from about 1900, the immediate catchment area of the station developed into a residential area at the initiative of BASF and on 1 January 1930 became an independent municipality as Limburgerhof. As a result the station’s name was changed to Limburgerhof. During the dissolution of the railway division of Ludwigshafen on 1 April 1937, it was transferred to the railway division of Mainz.

=== Developments since the Second World War ===
After the Second World War, Deutsche Bundesbahn assigned the station to the Bundesbahndirektion (Bundesbahn division) of Mainz, which was assigned all railway lines within the newly created state of Rhineland-Palatinate. On 1 August 1971, the station came under the jurisdiction of the railway division of Karlsruhe with the dissolution of the railway division of Mainz.

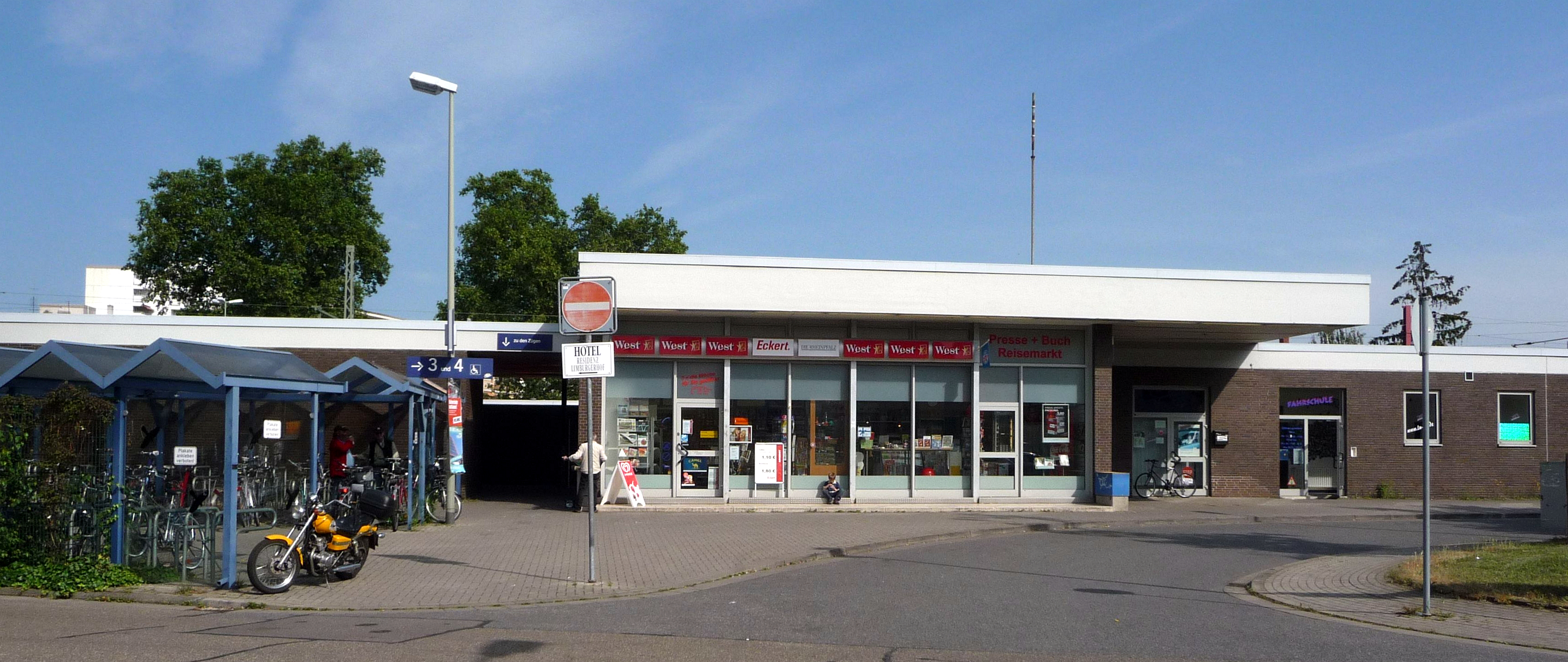
The new entrance building on the west side of the station after World War II

Despite its loss of traffic, the station was still classified as a station (rather than a halt) until the early 2000s. The platforms were made accessible for the handicapped in 2003 when they were upgraded for the integration of the Mannheim–Saarbrücken railway to Kaiserslautern into the network of the Rhine-Neckar S-Bahn. The S-Bahn was opened on 14 December 2003 and Limburgerhof station has been integrated in the network since then. At the same time, the railway tracks were rationalised and it was reclassified as a halt (Haltepunkt, meaning it has no longer has any sets of points). Starting about a kilometre to the north of the station, a bypass line for long-distance traffic runs parallel to the existing route through Limburgerhof and originally had the function of bypassing the existing line through the neighbouring Schifferstadt station.

== Infrastructure ==
The original entrance building on the east side of the railway station is a neoclassical structure with plaster work and was built in 1854. In addition, there was a toilet block and a wooden goods shed, which was demolished in 1992. After the Second World War a new entrance building was opened on the other side of the line.
