= Böhl-Iggelheim =

- Municipality
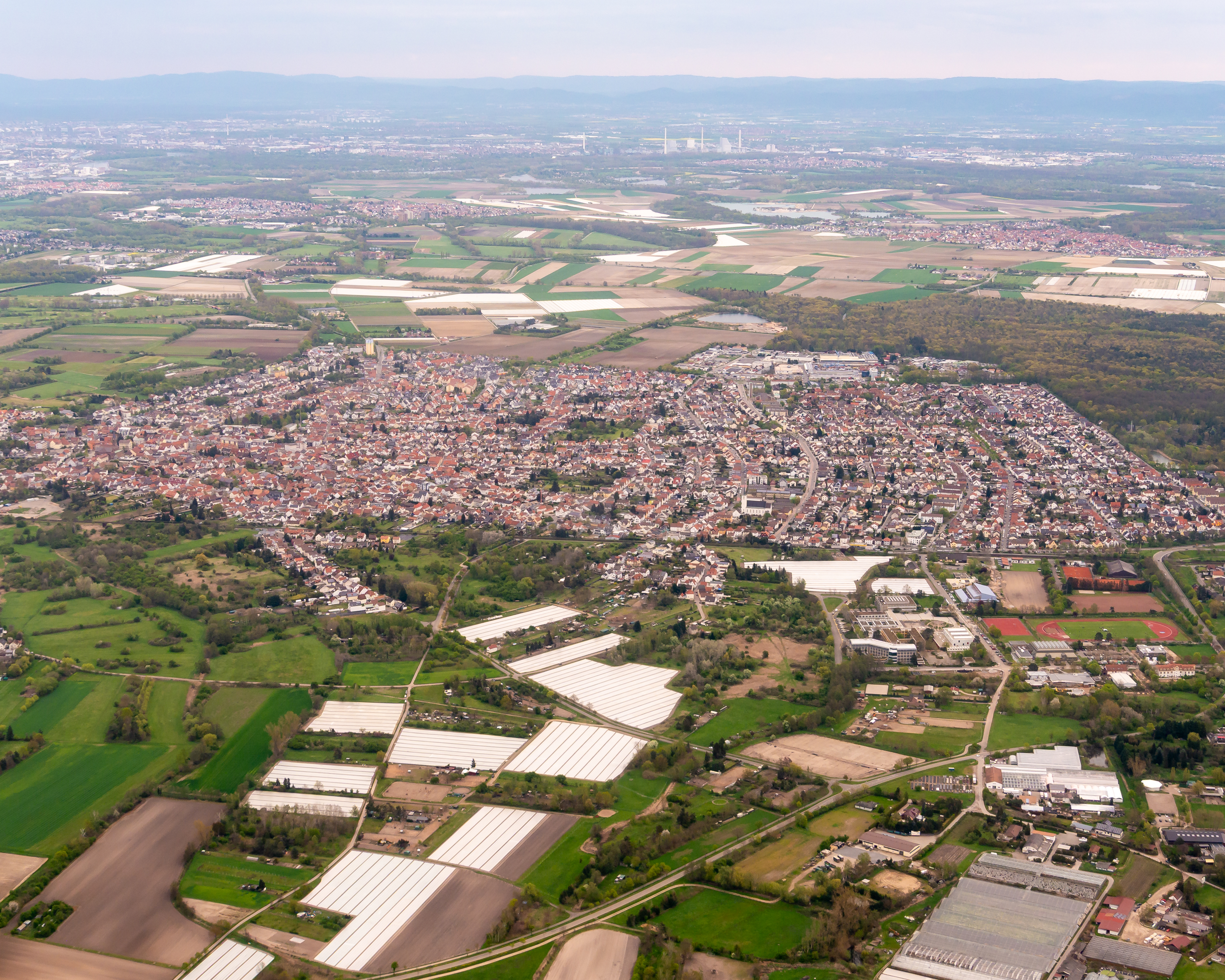

- Coat of arms

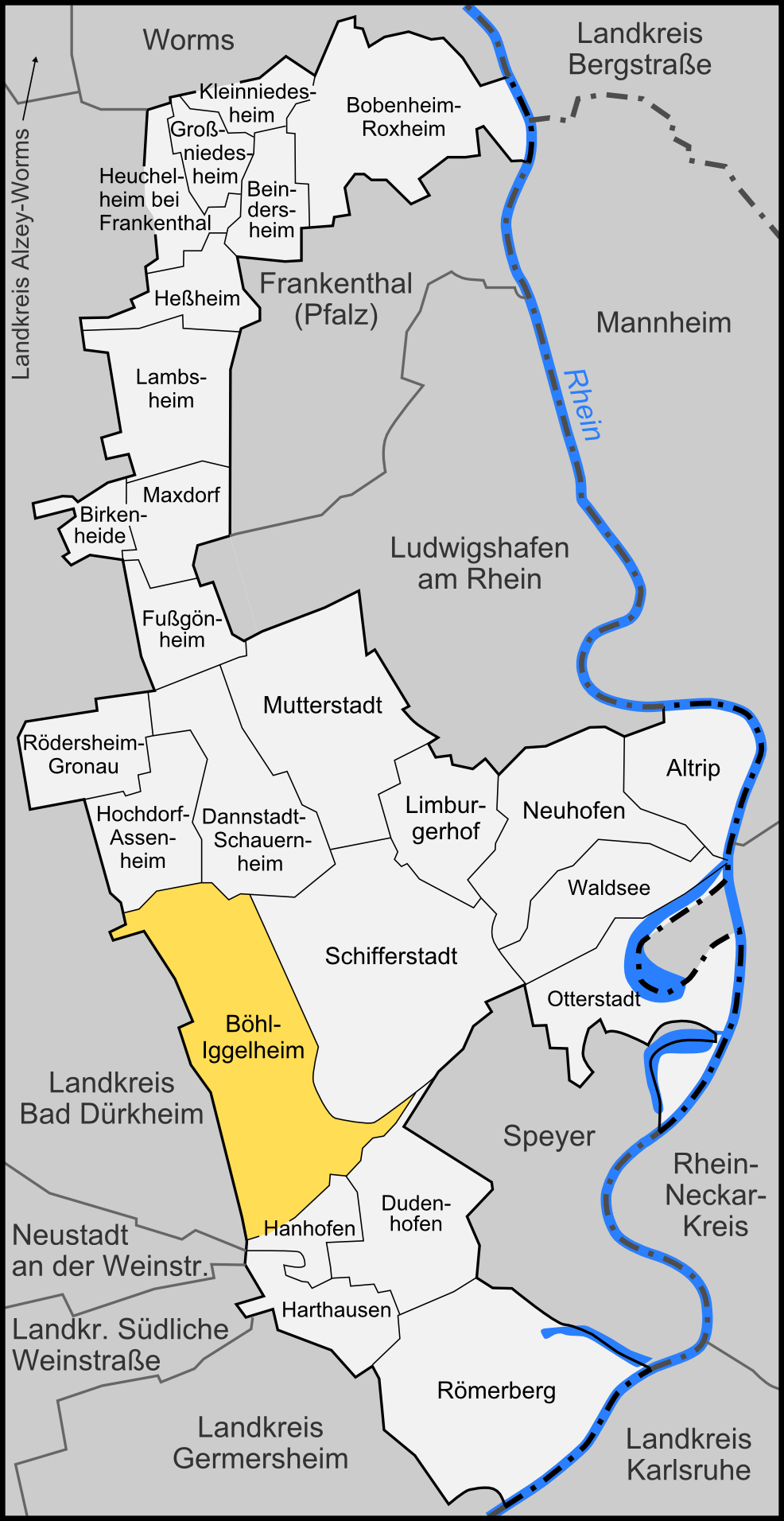
- Location of Böhl-Iggelheim within Rhein-Pfalz-Kreis district
- Interactive map of Böhl-Iggelheim
- Location within Germany Location within Rhineland-Palatinate
- Coordinates: 49°23′N 8°18′E
- Country: Germany
- State: Rhineland-Palatinate
- District: Rhein-Pfalz-Kreis

Government
  - Mayor (2022–30): Peter Christ (CDU)

Area
  - Total: 32.83 km^{2} (12.68 sq mi)
- Elevation: 110 m (360 ft)

Population (2025-12-31)
  - Total: 10,643
  - Density: 324.2/km^{2} (839.6/sq mi)
- Time zone: UTC+01:00 (CET)
  - Summer (DST): UTC+02:00 (CEST)
- Postal codes: 67459
- Dialling codes: 06324
- Vehicle registration: RP
- Website: www.boehl-iggelheim.de

Böhl-Iggelheim (German pronunciation: [ˈbøːl ˈʔɪɡl̩haɪm]) is a municipality in the Rhein-Pfalz-Kreis, in Rhineland-Palatinate, Germany. It has about 8,200 inhabitants and is situated approximately 15 km southwest of Ludwigshafen, and 10 km northwest of Speyer.

== Geography ==
Böhl-Iggelheim is in the very middle part of the flood plain of the River Rhine and is a typical Lower Palatinate village. The nearest cities are Mannheim and Ludwigshafen in the East and Speyer in the South.

The Niederwiesenweiher ("Low Meadows Pond,") which is a large pond where sand and gravel was excavated for the nearby motorway, lies to the East of Iggelheim. It is used for swimming and angling in Summer and ice skating in Winter when it is really cold. All the way to Speyer (10 km), the road from Iggelheim is surrounded on both sides by forest, within which there are many paths for walkers. Böhl-Iggelheim station is on the south-eastern edge of Böhl on the Mannheim–Saarbrücken railway and is served by the Rhine-Neckar S-Bahn.

Two wind turbines have been installed on the border of Böhl (49°22'55.1"N 8°16'07.3"E and 49°23'10.2"N 8°16'13.0"E,) but these belong to Meckenheim and Hassloch.

== Population ==
In 1957, Böhl-Iggelheim was formed consisting of an amalgamation of the northern part Böhl and the southern part Iggelheim. Böhl has a population of 3800 and Iggelheim almost 4400 inhabitants.

== History ==
Böhl was founded in the 8th Century as a Frankish village. Iggelheim had been founded about 100 years before as a Christian convent.

Both villages belonged to the realm of the German Kingdom and previously to the Frankish Empire. During the 30 Year's War both villages were burnt down by Spanish and Swedish invaders. From 1797 on, Böhl and Iggelheim belonged to the French and the Palatinate part of Bavaria after which they came under the direction of the new city of Ludwigshafen.

Even today it still belongs to Ludwigshafen and has its area council offices there under the name "Rheinpfalzkreis" (in English, "Rhenish Palatinate area.")

== Politics ==
The city council is dominated by the CDU, SPD and local parties FWG and BIL. The Mayor Peter Christ is a member of the CDU. There is also a youth council run by local young people.

== Notable people ==
- Christian Reif (* 24. Oktober 1984), 2010 European champion in Long jump
