= Böhl-Iggelheim station =

Railway station in Böhl-Iggelheim, Germany

Böhl-Iggelheim
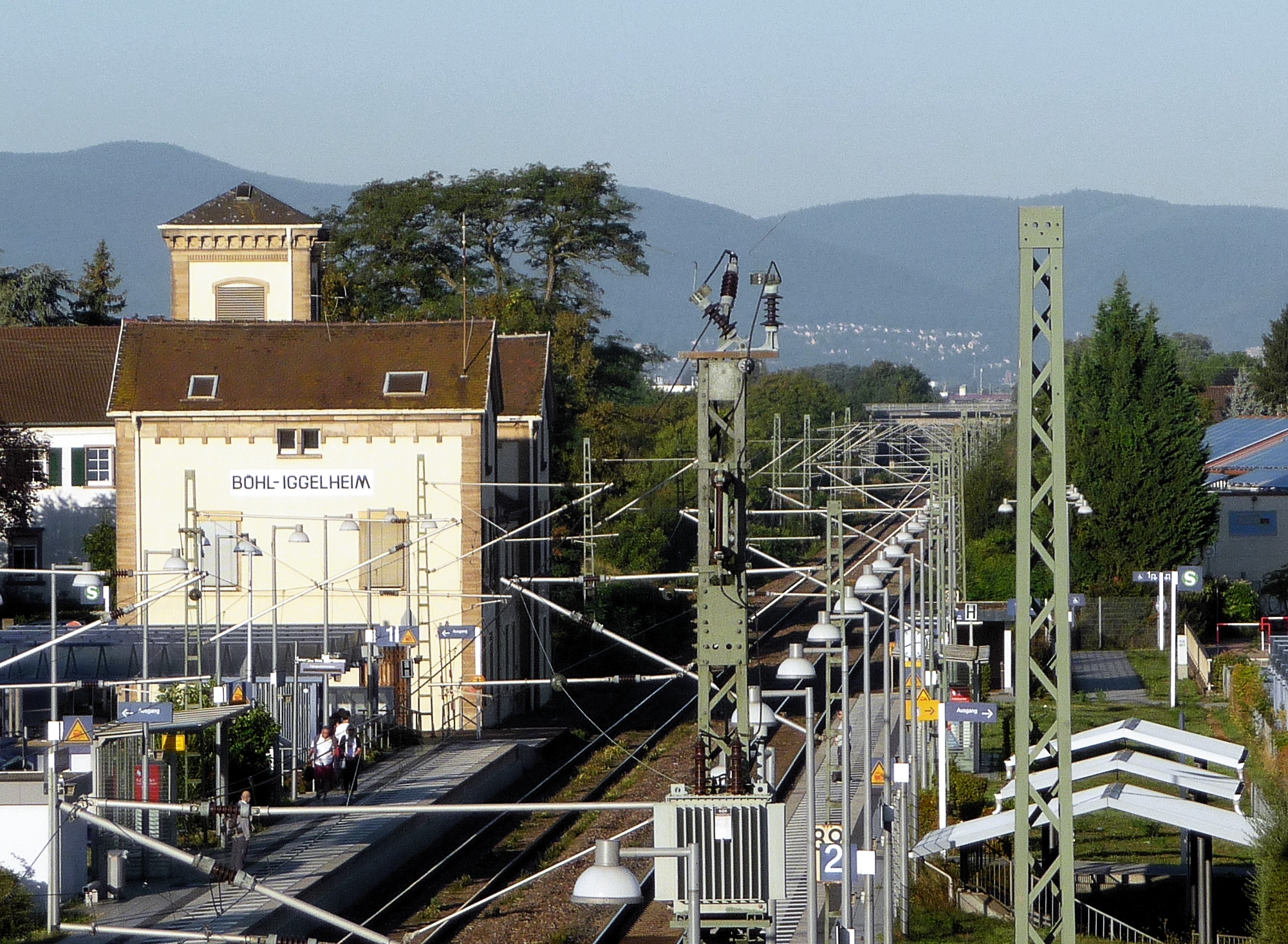
- Böhl-Iggelheim station in September 2012

General information
- Location: Am Bahnhofplatz 4, Böhl, Böhl-Iggelheim, Rhineland-Palatinate; Germany
- Coordinates: 49°22′48″N 8°18′19″E
- Lines: Mannheim–Saarbrücken (km 89.7) (KBS 665.1/665.2/670)
- Platforms: 2

Construction
- Accessible: Yes
- Architectural style: Maximilian style (Gothic Revival)

Other information
- Station code: 747
- DS100 code: RBOE
- IBNR: 8001057
- Category: 5
- Fare zone: VRN: 133
- Website: www.bahnhof.de

History
- Opened: 11 June 1847
Location

Böhl-Iggelheim station is in the town of Böhl-Iggelheim in the German state of Rhineland-Palatinate. Deutsche Bahn classifies it as a category 5 station and it has two platforms. The station is located in the network of the Verkehrsverbund Rhein-Neckar (Rhine-Neckar transport association, VRN). Its address is Am Bahnhofsplatz 4.

It is located on the Mannheim–Saarbrücken railway, which essentially consists of the Palatine Ludwig Railway (Pfälzische Ludwigsbahn, Ludwigshafen–Bexbach). It was opened on 11 June 1847, when the Ludwigshafen–Neustadt section of the Ludwig Railway was put into full operation. Until the Second World War, the station was significant as a regional freight hub, but since about 1970 it has served almost entirely as a passenger station. In the meantime, it has been reconstructed as a halt (Haltepunkt). Since December 2003, it has been served by lines S1 and S2 of the Rhine-Neckar S-Bahn. Its former entrance building is heritage listed.

== Location ==
The station is located on the south-eastern edge of the village of Böhl. Running parallel to and north of the railway tracks is the local Bahnhofstraße ("station street"). South of the railway line is an industrial area, which the street of Am Bahnhofsplatz ("at the station forecourt") passes through. The eastern area of the station is bridged by Landesstraße 628 (a state road).

== History ==
=== Railway initiatives around Böhl and Iggelheim ===
Originally it had been planned to build a railway running north–south in the then Bavarian Circle of the Rhine (Rheinkreis). However, it was agreed to first build a railway running east–west, which was to be used primarily for transporting coal from the Saar district (now part of the Saarland) to the Rhine.

At first, it was unclear whether this should run through the area of the then autonomous municipalities of Böhl and Iggelheim. Speyer, the capital of the Palatinate, fought to become the eastern terminus of the route. It was argued essentially that the cathedral city was an old trading town, whereas Rheinschanze, which was alternatively proposed as the end of the line, would only serve the transit of goods as it was merely a military base. However, these endeavours did not succeed as the main focus of attention was on the Rhine-Neckar region – especially on Mannheim – and the export of coal to the area on the other side of the Rhine was regarded as more important. Speyer, however, was to receive a branch line.

Two options were discussed for the general route through Kaiserslautern, as the development of a route through the Palatinate Forest (Pfälzerwald) proved to be complicated. At first the responsible engineers considered a route through the Dürkheim valley. However, this proved impractical because its side valleys were too low, and above all the climb to Frankenstein would have been too steep. This would have required stationary steam engines and rope haulage to overcome the differences in altitude.

Originally it was planned to build a railway station only in the neighbouring towns of Schifferstadt and Haßloch. However, it was subsequently agreed to also provide Böhl with a station. Due to the importance for the neighbouring town of Iggelheim, it was named Böhl-Iggelheim.

=== Construction of the railways on the Gemarkung Böhl ===
In November 1844, railway construction started in the Böhl district and in the neighbouring communities with the provision of information to the owners of affected properties that set out the requirement that they make their boundaries clearly visible. Seven owners in Böhl were initially not ready to sell, but eventually gave way. Those owners who sold immediately received 14 gulden per lot, while the hesitant received 6 gulden and 30 Kreuzer (half a gulden). Amounts under 100 gulden were paid by the Neustadt bank of L. Dacque from June 1845 onwards. Subsequently, actual construction began and the Ludwig Railway was opened on 11 June 1847. Railway operations also provided some jobs. In 1847, seven persons from Böhl applied for positions in the railway.

The village’s post office was also installed in the new station. In 1907, however, the municipality asked for the post office to be moved to the town centre, but the postal authorities in Speyer insisted on it staying in the station, partly because the route from the town centre to the station was not long and because the postal services and railways depended on each other. The post office remained in the station until 1920.

The station had been built together with a crossing keeper’s house. In the autumn of 1847, a loading ramp was built for cattle for fattening and for sale and in the subsequent period there were further minor structural changes to the installations. In 1868, there were signalmen’s houses, but they were demolished in 1928.

=== Enlargement of station in 1923 ===
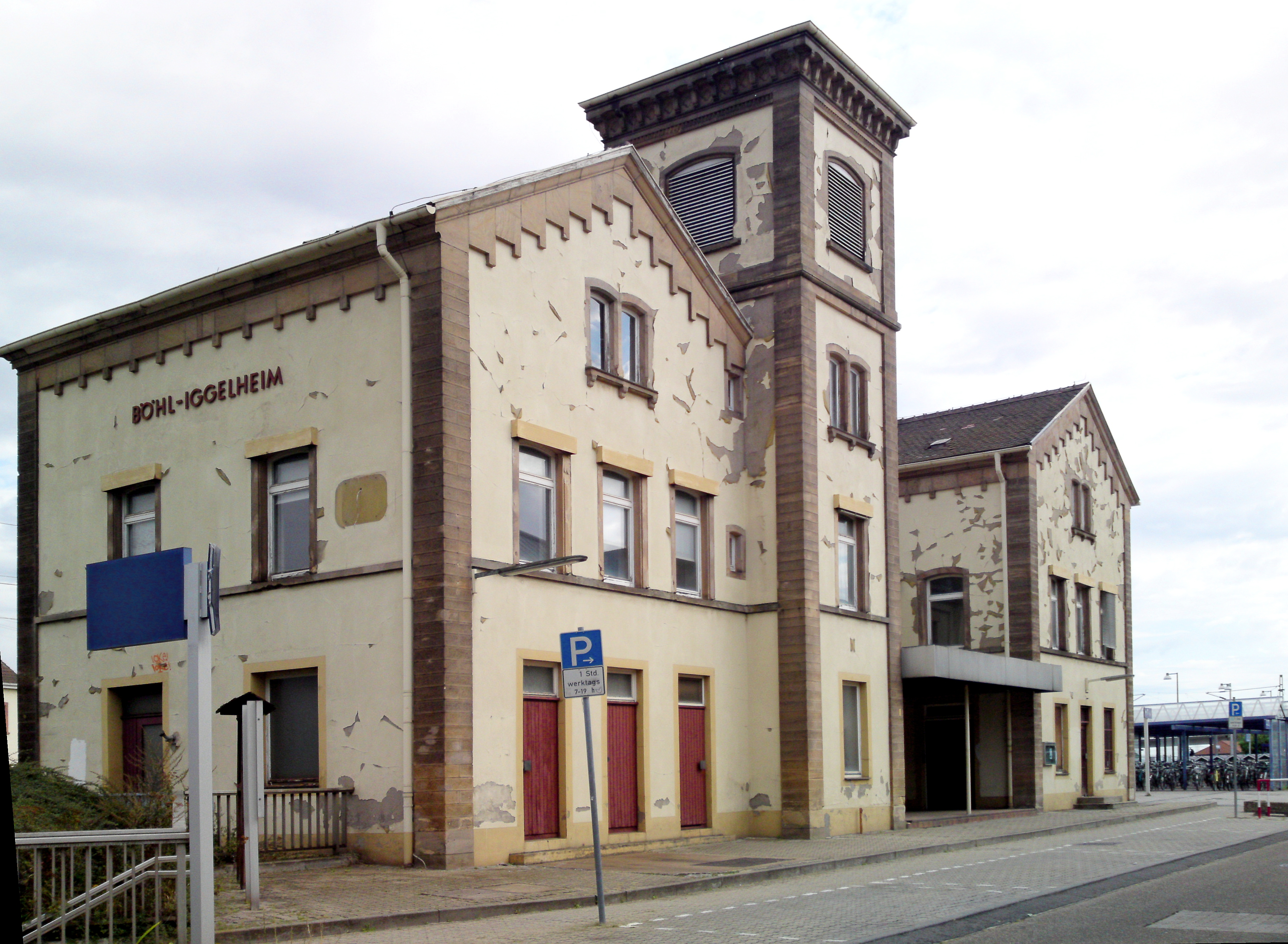
Former entrance building

In 1922, the station was integrated into the newly founded Reichsbahndirektion (Reichsbahn railway division) of Ludwigshafen. During the dissolution of the railway division of Ludwigshafen on 1 April 1937, it was transferred to the railway division of Mainz.

After the construction of the third track in 1923 the station was enlarged. This resulted in an underpass, a signal box towards Schifferstadt and a new large wooden ramp for freight loading. Coal was particularly important for freight operations in Böhl, as there were a total of seven coal traders in Böhl and Iggelheim. The coal trader Schmitt in Iggelheimer Straße even had its own siding. Other freight handling involved mainly vegetables, livestock and building materials of all kinds. The local industry in particular benefited from the station. Large goods consignments were wood for shoring up mines from the Lenz company, bicycles from the Schwarz company and goods from the Schöffler paint factory. From 1933 onwards, the station had its own small locomotive for marshalling the numerous freight wagons to be removed.

In a Second World War air raid on 14 February 1942, the station, the railway tracks, the power lines and some surrounding residential buildings were damaged. The locomotive shed was completely destroyed.

=== Developments since the Second World War ===
After the Second World War, Deutsche Bundesbahn assigned the station to the Bundesbahndirektion (Bundesbahn division) of Mainz, which was assigned all railway lines within the newly created state of Rhineland-Palatinate.

After the war, the station soon gained importance as a freight hub for local industry, especially the companies of Garthe and Orth, which uses the railway to transport their goods. However, freight handling soon fell again as the companies preferred to use road freight. As a result of this development, the express goods shed in the station forecourt was demolished. The goods shed was temporarily rented to Garthe before it was demolished in favour of new express tracks. The signal box was closed around 1968.

On 1 August 1971, the station came under the jurisdiction of the railway division of Karlsruhe with the dissolution of the railway division of Mainz. Subsequently, the classification of the station was reduced to a halt.

The platforms were made accessible for the handicapped in 2003 when they were upgraded for the integration of the Mannheim–Saarbrücken railway to Kaiserslautern into the network of the Rhine-Neckar S-Bahn. The S-Bahn was opened on 14 December 2003 and the station has been integrated in the network since then.

== Infrastructure ==
The listed entrance building is a stately plaster building erected in the so-called Maximilianstil (Maximilian style, a form of Gothic Revival). Its middle part dates back to 1847; the gabled house in the west as well as the staircase tower were added in the 1860s. The eastern wing was built around 1910. It is no longer has a significant use for railway operations.

== Sources ==
=== Further reading ===
- Theo Brendel (2005). "Die Eisenbahn". In Gemeindeverwaltung Böhl-Iggelheim (ed.). Böhl 780–2005 (in German). Böhl-Iggelheim. pp. 365–369.
