= Limburgerhof =

- Municipality
- Coat of arms

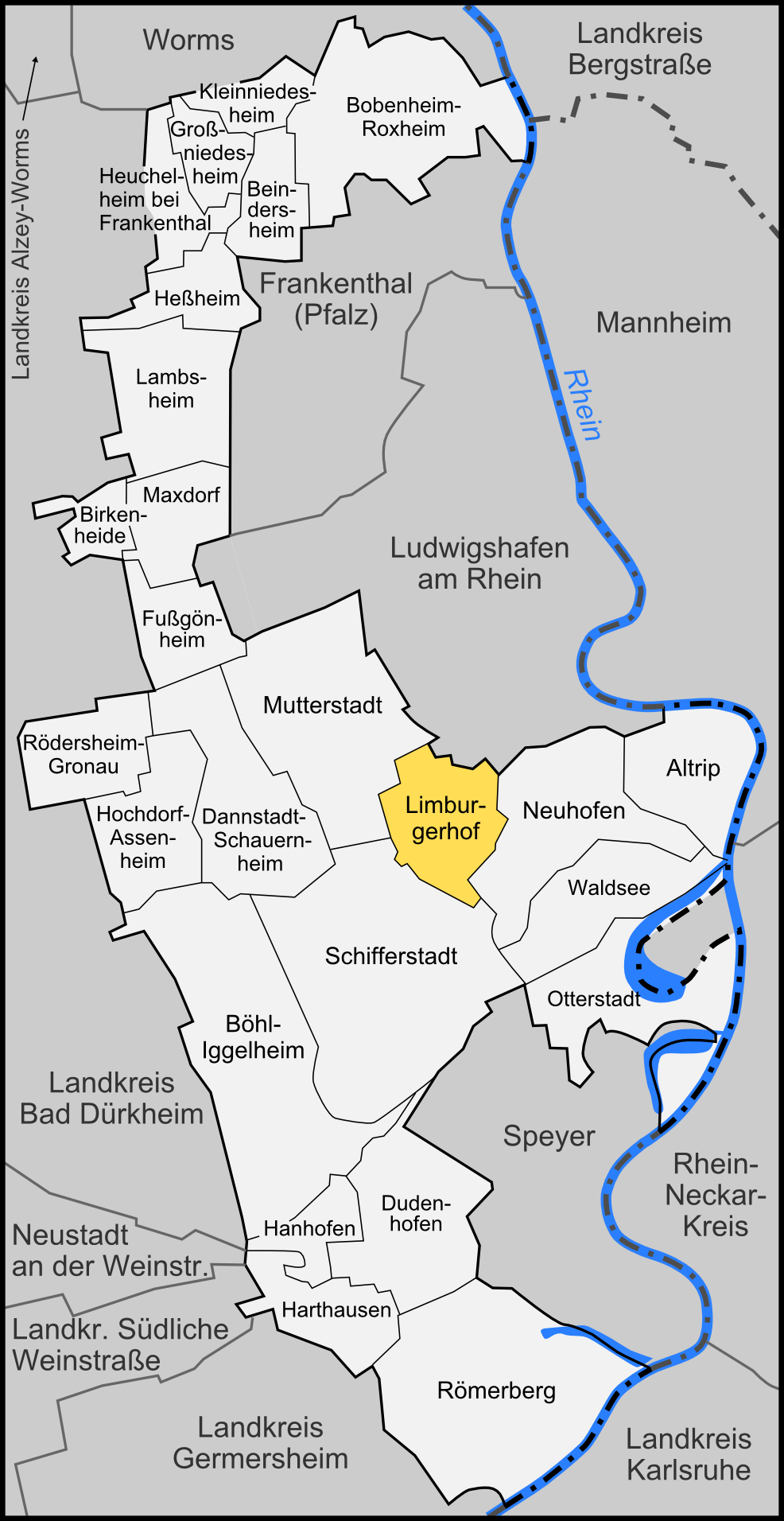
- Location of Limburgerhof within Rhein-Pfalz-Kreis district
- Interactive map of Limburgerhof
- Location within Germany Location within Rhineland-Palatinate
- Coordinates: 49°25′N 8°24′E
- Country: Germany
- State: Rhineland-Palatinate
- District: Rhein-Pfalz-Kreis

Government
  - Mayor (2018–26): Andreas Poignée (CDU)

Area
  - Total: 9 km^{2} (3.5 sq mi)
- Elevation: 97 m (318 ft)

Population (2025-12-31)
  - Total: 11,619
  - Density: 1,300/km^{2} (3,300/sq mi)
- Time zone: UTC+01:00 (CET)
  - Summer (DST): UTC+02:00 (CEST)
- Postal codes: 67117
- Dialling codes: 06236
- Vehicle registration: RP
- Website: www.limburgerhof.de

Limburgerhof (German pronunciation: [ˈlɪmbʊʁɡɐhoːf]) is a municipality in the Rhein-Pfalz-Kreis, in Rhineland-Palatinate, Germany, 7 km southwest of Ludwigshafen.

It is known in the region because of an Agrochemical Center of the world's largest chemical company BASF, which has its headquarters in Ludwigshafen. The village with a population of about 10 000 was founded in 1930.

== Geography ==
Limburgerhof is located between Ludwigshafen and Speyer. Limburgerhof station is on the Mannheim–Saarbrücken railway and is served by the Rhine-Neckar S-Bahn.

== History ==
In 1035 the King of the Saliers Konrad II gave the land around Schifferstadt to the Limburg Abbey, near Bad Dürkheim. The land nowadays belonging to Limburgerhof was part of it. The oldest part of Limburgerhof that still exists is Rehhütte which was first mentioned in 1590. The mill on the Rehbach stream had already been mentioned in 1241.

In 1664 Elector Karl Ludwig settled two Mennonite families from Switzerland in Kohlhof, which is still part of Limburgerhof. From their land six farms developed. The Mennonite community still exists.

In 1826 Graf Waldner von Freundstein bought the estate on the crossroads between Mannheimer Weg and the Mainz to Speyer road that Francois Biechy established in 1807. Two of these buildings that he constructed are still here: the small castle in classicist style and the three-storey tower in the park.

Biechy and von Freundstein developed the land, that in the 17th and 18th centuries had often been a place of war, into fertile agricultural land. In 1851 the tradesman Carl Gottlob Reihlen built the Friedensau sugar factory and began the production of sugar beet on the Limburgerhof land.

BASF took over the estate in 1898. In 1902 they built the “Old Colony” of 63 semi-detached houses as a housing estate for workers. Following this unique settlement came the agricultural research centre in 1914. In 1917 BASF took over the estate and two farms in Rehhütte, which today have been turned into a modern conference centre and estate management centre.

At this time the BASF Agricultural Centre, which has made Limburgerhof’s name known throughout the world, has 1400 employees in the areas of plant protection, plant biotechnology, fine chemistry and fertilisers.

The recent development has run parallel to industrial growth in Ludwigshafen and is connected with the construction of the railway to Saarbrücken by Paul von Denis in the middle of the 19th century. But first the construction of the “Old Colony” was the starting point for this growth. In 1901 there were 200 residents, their number grew to 2300 in 1930, in 1958 to 5800 and today there are 10,600 residents.

The main increase in Limburgerhof’s population came after the Second World War. Refugees from the East and the growing interest among city dwellers in finding living areas outside the congested city areas necessitated new building areas. The infrastructure including schools, sewage system, green areas, library and sports areas were quickly extended. in 1968 the first German Master of Indiaca startet in Limburgerhof.

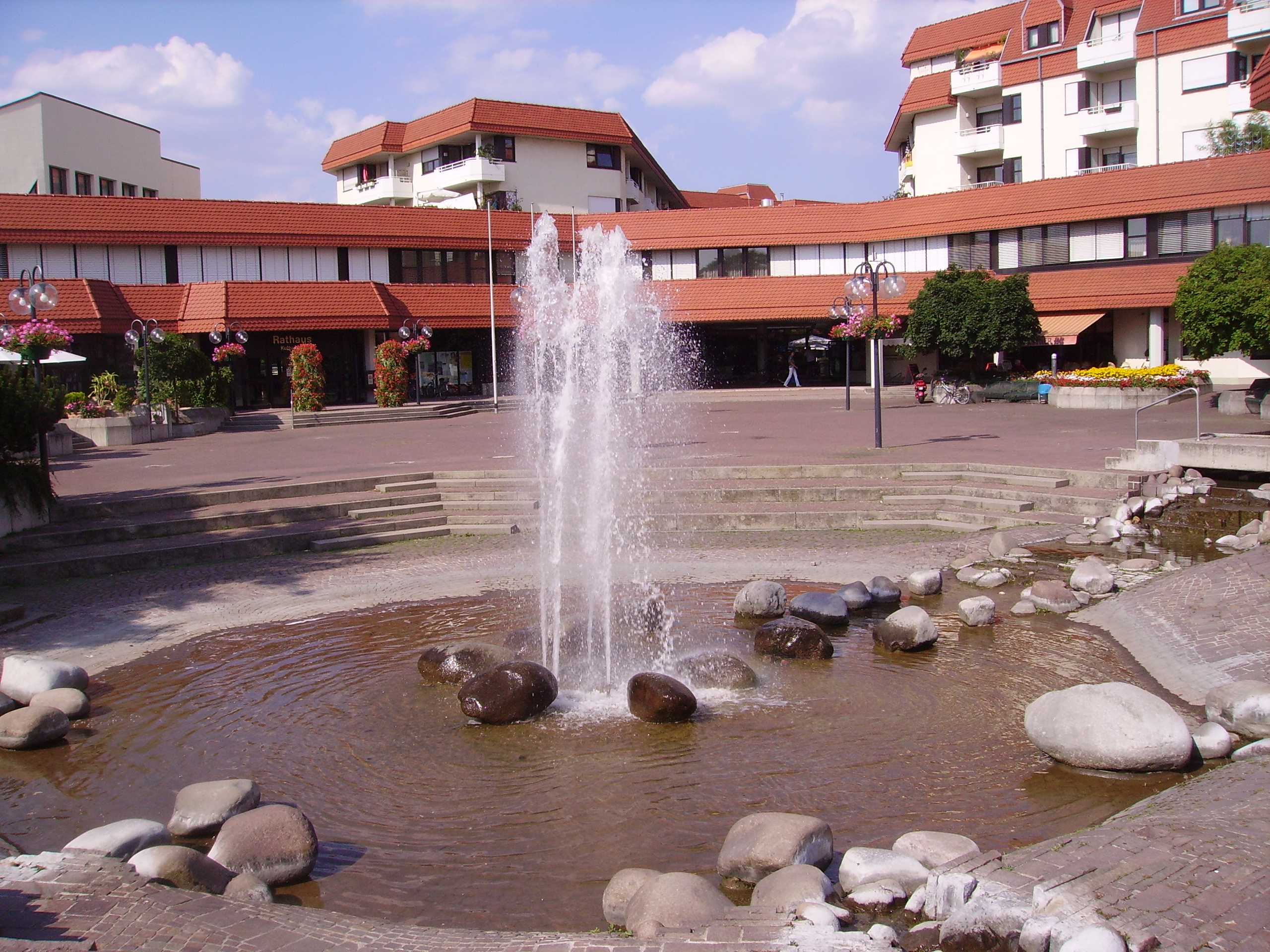
town hall

In 1983 a town centre building with Town Hall, room for cultural events, theatre, doctors’ surgeries, shops and apartments was opened and became the focal point of the town. Since 1975 the town has been twinned with the French town of Chenôve in Burgundy.

The living areas around the industrial centres in the Rhein-Neckar triangle are more and more important. Limburgerhof is ideal because of its excellent transport links and high living standard and many leisure opportunities. Particularly important in the town is the promotion of clubs, looking after senior citizens and also children and youthwork. In 1993 Limburgerhof was one of the winners in the competition for “Child Friendly Towns”.

== Education ==
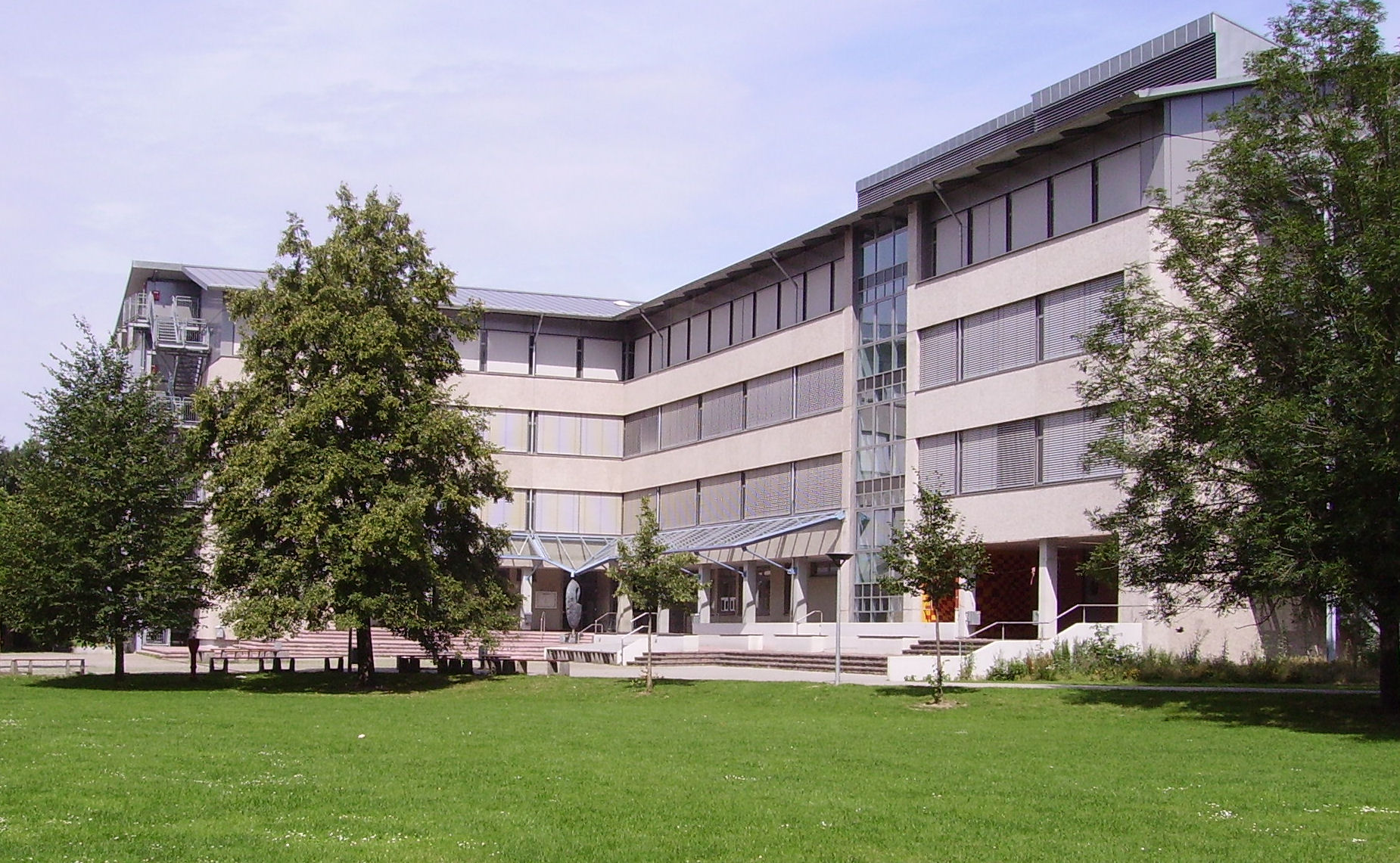
school

There are two primary schools, the Domholz- and the Carl-Bosch-Schule. Besides there is a secondary school, which combines Realschule and Hauptschule.

== Hotels ==
The only hotel in Limburgerhof is the small 4-star Residenz Hotel, built around 1990.

== Sports ==
There is a small stadium, called Waldstadion, close to the Domholzschule.
