= Heidelberg Hauptbahnhof =

Main railway station in Heidelberg

Heidelberg Hbf
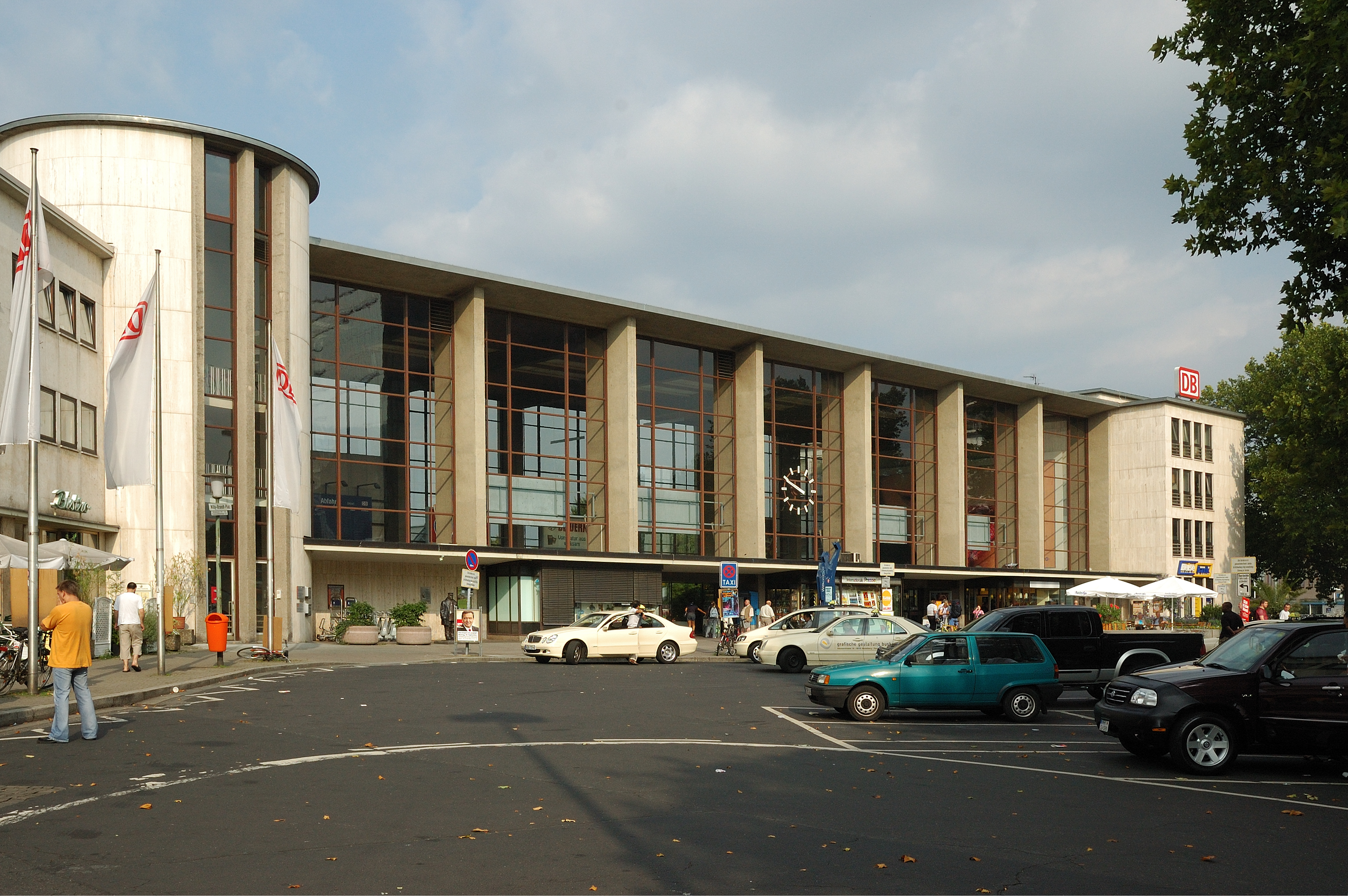
- East facade of the station main building in Willy-Brandt-Platz

General information
- Location: Heidelberg, Baden-Württemberg; Germany
- Coordinates: 49°24′13″N 8°40′31″E
- Owner: Deutsche Bahn
- Operator: DB InfraGO
- Lines: Main-Neckar Railway (650); Schifferstadt–Mannheim–Heidelberg (665); Mannheim–Saarbrücken (670); Baden mainline (701); Neckar Valley Railway (705); Elsenz Valley Railway (706)
- Platforms: 9 (1–5 and 7–10)

Construction
- Accessible: Yes
- Architect: Helmuth Conradi
- Architectural style: Modernist

Other information
- Station code: 2628
- DS100 code: RH
- IBNR: 8000156
- Category: 2
- Fare zone: VRN: 125
- Website: www.bahnhof.de

History
- Opened: 1955

Passengers
- 2009: 42,000 daily
Services
| Preceding station | DB Fernverkehr | Following station |
|---|---|---|
| Mannheim Hbf towards Berlin Gesundbrunnen | ICE 11 | Stuttgart Hbf towards München Hbf |
| Weinheim (Bergstraße) Hbf towards Berlin Ostbahnhof | ICE 13 | Wiesloch-Walldorf towards Karlsruhe Hbf or Stuttgart Hbf |
| Weinheim (Bergstraße) Hbf towards Hamburg-Altona | ICE 15 | Vaihingen (Enz) towards Stuttgart Hbf |
| Darmstadt Hbf One-way operation | ICE/ECE 20 | Stuttgart Hbf Terminus |
| Mannheim Hbf towards Hamburg Hbf or Kiel Hbf | ICE 22 | Vaihingen (Enz) towards Stuttgart Hbf |
| Weinheim towards Bremen Hbf | ICE 26 | Wiesloch-Walldorf towards Karlsruhe Hbf |
| Mannheim Hbf towards Dortmund Hbf | IC 34 | Wiesloch-Walldorf One-way operation |
| Mannheim Hbf towards Köln Hbf | ICE 45 | Vaihingen (Enz) towards Stuttgart Hbf |
| Mannheim Hbf towards Dresden Hbf | IC 55 | Vaihingen (Enz) towards Stuttgart Hbf |
| Mannheim Hbf towards Dortmund Hbf | IC 55 Allgäu | Vaihingen (Enz) towards Oberstdorf |
| Weinheim (Bergstraße) Hbf towards Frankfurt (Main) Hbf | ICE 62 | Stuttgart Hbf towards Graz Hbf |
| Mannheim Hbf towards Dortmund Hbf | ICE 62 Bodensee | Stuttgart Hbf towards Innsbruck Hbf |
| Wiesloch-Walldorf towards Zürich HB | IC 87 | Weinheim towards Frankfurt (Main) Hbf |
| Mannheim Hbf One-way operation | ICE 89 | Stuttgart Hbf towards St. Anton am Arlberg |
| Weinheim (Bergstraße) Hbf towards Frankfurt (Main) Hbf | ICE 89 | Stuttgart Hbf towards St. Anton am Arlberg |
| Preceding station | | Following station |
| Darmstadt Hbf towards Berlin Hbf | FLX 10 | Stuttgart Hbf Terminus |
| Preceding station | (Stuttgart) | Following station |
| Mannheim Hbf Terminus | RE 10a | Neckargemünd towards Heilbronn |
| Mannheim Hbf Terminus | RE 10b | Neckargemünd towards Heilbronn |
| Preceding station | DB Regio Mitte | Following station |
| Terminus | RE 40 | Wiesloch-Walldorf towards Freudenstadt Hbf |
| Terminus | RE 73 | Wiesloch-Walldorf towards Karlsruhe Hbf |
| Heidelberg-Pfaffengrund/Wieblingen towards Frankfurt (Main) Hbf | RB 68 | Heidelberg-Kirchheim/Rohrbach towards Wiesloch-Walldorf |
| Preceding station | Rhine-Neckar S-Bahn | Following station |
| Heidelberg-Pfaffengrund/Wieblingen towards Homburg (Saar) Hbf | S1 | Heidelberg-Weststadt/Südstadt towards Osterburken |
| Heidelberg-Pfaffengrund/Wieblingen towards Kaiserslautern Hbf | S2 | Heidelberg-Weststadt/Südstadt towards Mosbach (Baden) |
| Heidelberg-Pfaffengrund/Wieblingen towards Germersheim | S3 | Heidelberg-Kirchheim/Rohrbach towards Karlsruhe Hbf |
| Heidelberg-Pfaffengrund/Wieblingen towards Ludwigshafen (Rhein) BASF Nord | S4 | Heidelberg-Kirchheim/Rohrbach towards Ludwigshafen (Rhein) Hbf |
| Terminus | S5 | Heidelberg-Weststadt/Südstadt towards Eppingen or Bad Rappenau |
| Terminus | S51 | Heidelberg-Weststadt/Südstadt towards Aglasterhausen |
Location

Heidelberg Hauptbahnhof (commonly known as Heidelberg Hbf) is the main railway station for the city of Heidelberg. In 2005 it was used by around 42,000 passengers per day and is one of the largest passenger stations in the German state of Baden-Württemberg. The station is classified by Deutsche Bahn as a category 2 station.

The first station was built in 1840 as a terminus near Heidelberg's old town, Altstadt, at the site of the modern Adenauerplatz. Urban problems as a result of the extension of part of the station to form a through station in 1862 and a lack of expansion options resulted in a decision the early 20th century to relocate the station as a new through station a kilometre to the west. Interrupted by two world wars, the relocation of the Heidelberg railway facilities took over 50 years. Inaugurated in 1955, the station is now considered to be "the most beautiful and architecturally interesting buildings of Deutsche Bundesbahn", and since 1972 it has been listed as a "cultural monument of special importance" under the historical monuments register of Baden-Württemberg. The station is located in Willy-Brandt-Platz about two kilometres west of central Heidelberg. Diagonally opposite is the former headquarters of Heidelberger Druckmaschinen. It is served by the Rhine-Neckar S-Bahn.

== History ==
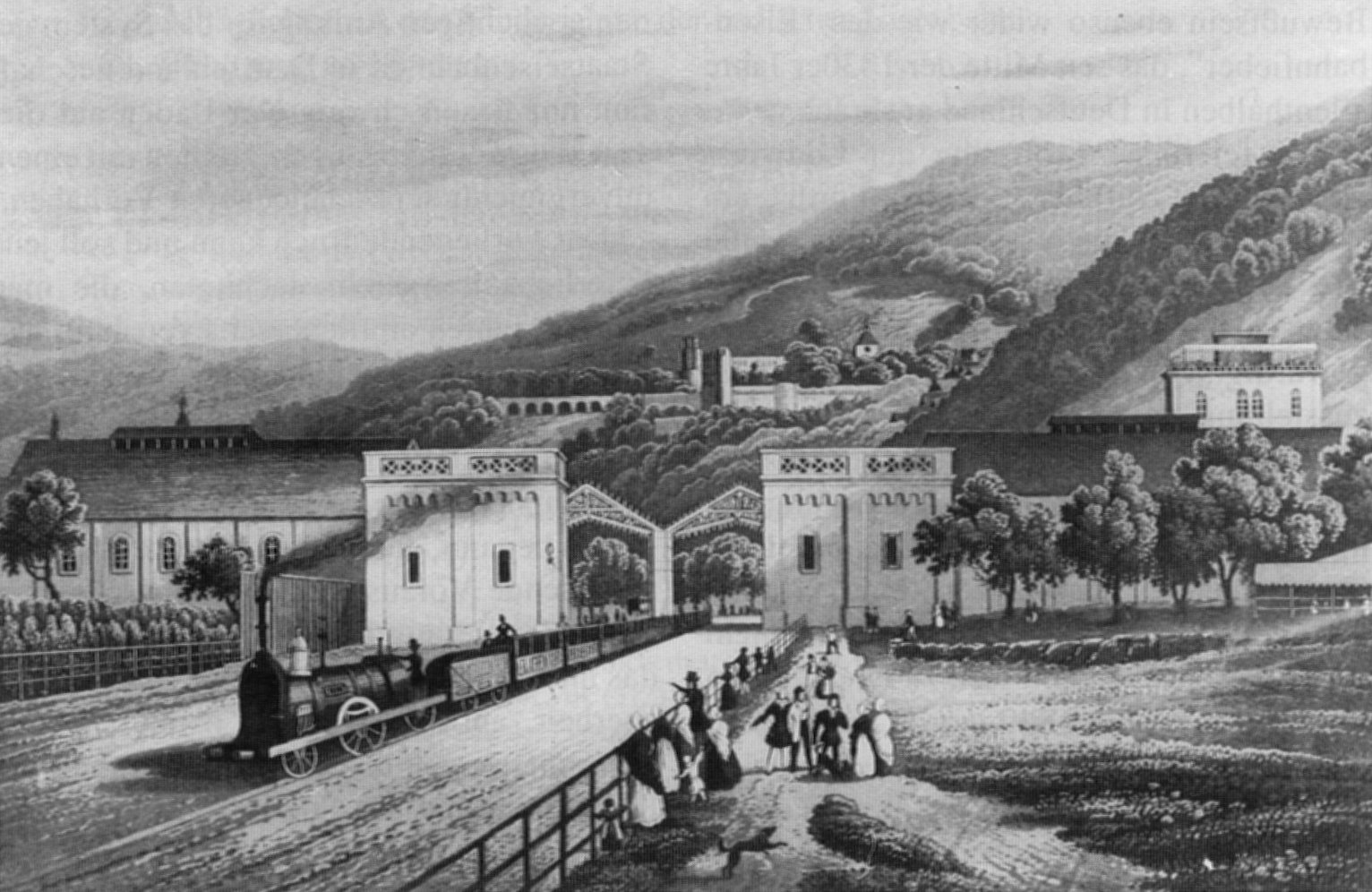
Old station in 1840

On 12 September 1840 the original terminal station was opened in Heidelberg at the end of the first section of the Baden Mainline from Mannheim Hauptbahnhof. It was decided to build the station as a terminal station so that it could be as close as possible to the city. The station was between today's Poststraße and Bahnhofstraße and the station forecourt fronted the Rohrbacherstraße. The station, which was designed by the architect Friedrich Eisenlohr, consisted of several simply designed buildings in a neoclassical style with romantic and ornamental elements. The main building was built on the side towards the city from red Neckar sandstone and it was covered with a contrasting slate roof. The two-span wooden train shed covered four platform tracks and it was comparatively large for the period at 75 metres long and 28 metres wide. The exit of the station platform was flanked by two gate towers, used as water towers. Within the station there were six sets of points and 15 turntables on which light carriages could be rotated manually. According to the first timetable, four trains ran daily to Mannheim, requiring a running time of 35 to 40 minutes.

In 1843, the line was opened from Heidelberg to Karlsruhe Hauptbahnhof. In 1846, the Main-Neckar Railway opened to Frankfurt and a second station was completed in 1848 with "architecture in an exemplary manner" and was integrated into the existing station track field. The station was also designed by Eisenlohr and was largely symmetrical to the existing station infrastructure, the construction of which had made allowance for a possible extension to the north. Because the Main-Neckar Railway was a standard gauge line, in contrast to 1600 mm broad gauge of the Baden State Railway until it was regauged in April 1855, all freight had to be transhipped, using a freight shed in the middle of the station. The two main station buildings were linked by an arcade in the centre of which was a gateway that served as the main entrance to the station. In addition, there were two mixed gauge tracks connecting to a roundhouse and via a transfer table to a carriage shed. The station remained in this basic form for the next 100 years.

=== Conversion into a through station in 1862 and problems with urban development ===
With the opening of the Odenwald Railway in 1862, the station became a through station and was extended slightly to the south. In 1873 Heidelberg became the terminus of a branch line to Schwetzingen and Speyer. In 1864, a connecting curve was opened between the lines to Mannheim and Karlsruhe in order to relieve the station. A new freight yard and marshalling yard were built in 1873 west of Römerstraße along the route to Mannheim.

At the beginning of the 20th century the development of Bergheim to the north of the station and modern Weststadt to the south of it prevented the extension of railway precinct. In 1902, 340 trains operated on weekdays from Heidelberg station. In the timetable of 1954/1955 over 400 services ran. Important long-distance trains bypassed Heidelberg, because the capacity of the station was exhausted.

At the same time the station was affected by town planning. With increased road traffic following the construction of the Odenwald Railway in 1862, the level crossing of Rohrbacher Straße in the modern Adenauerplatz, in particular, proved to be annoying. At the end of 1949, 10,800 vehicles passed through the crossing, which was closed to road traffic for three to four hours each day. A pedestrian underpass was opened there in 1893. Passengers on the Heidelberg tramway had to pass through the crossing on foot as the tram lines ended on both sides of the level crossing.

=== Attempts to relocate the station 1902–1955 ===
In 1873, there was consideration of relocating the railway station. This was opposed by hoteliers whose businesses were located in the area. When one of the wooden station buildings burnt down in 1892, some spectators wished that the flames had spread to the whole station. The nationalisation of the Main-Neckar Railway in 1895 facilitated the development of initial plans in the 1890s. First, the city's preference was that the station be raised in its old central location. In 1901, the Heidelberg citizens' committee approved a proposal of the Baden State Railways to build a new through station a good kilometre west of the old site. It envisaged the construction of 20 platform tracks. The total construction costs was estimated to be 40 million marks.

After groundbreaking in 1902, work began on building the passenger station in a cutting about three km long, up to 250 metres wide and four to five metres deep. The excavated material was used to raise the marshalling yard and the freight yard to a higher level. The marshalling yard, which was located southwest of the passenger station, went into operation in March 1914. In October 1910, after 15 months of digging, the nearly 2,500 metres long Königstuhl tunnel was completed, connecting the Odenwald Railway to the new rail infrastructure. The work was stopped at the beginning of the First World War. At that time, the freight trains from the Odenwald Railway ran through the Königstuhl tunnel, somewhat reducing the stress on level crossings in the Heidelberg region.

After the war, the construction project was initially abandoned due to the economic situation. From 1926, an operations station and train depot were built between the planned passenger station and Wieblingenan; these went into operation in 1928. Between 1932 and 1936 Karlstor station was rebuilt at the eastern portal of the Königstuhl tunnel. In 1933, the railway division decided it was unable to finance the continued construction of the station for the foreseeable future.

In the Nazi period, Carl Neinhaus, Mayor of Heidelberg from 1929 to 1945, was the "key figure" in the planning of the relocation of the station. Neinhaus aimed at a comprehensive redesign of the city centre, requiring the clearing of railway property. In 1936, the city council instructed the architect Paul Bonatz to produce designs, and two years later he was joined by German Bestelmeyer, Hans Freese and Konstanty Gutschow. In 1938, Neinhaus made contact with Albert Speer. As a result of the assistance of Speer, Hitler signed a decree in May 1941 under which Heidelberg received the status of a so-called redesigned city (Neugestaltungsstadt). This would have sped up plans so that construction work could begin immediately after the end of the Second World War.

Among the plans that were suspended in 1943 due to the war, was an idea conceived by Freese: a wide boulevard in the area of the former station, connecting the new station to the city centre. The road would have given a view of Heidelberg Castle to the east and the entrance building of the new station to the west. The station building would have been placed perpendicular to the street and obliquely to the rail tracks.

During World War II only a small part of the station was destroyed; most affected were parts of the operations depot and the freight yard. From 1947 another public debate began over the continued construction of the station. 80% of the planned facilities with a value of DM 70 million (in 1952 values) had been completed at the end of the war. In a review of the plans, the number of platform tracks was reduced from 20 to eight, so that the cost of the remaining construction was reduced to DM 12 million. The state of Baden-Württemberg financed the work with a loan of DM 2.5 million. The first sod was turned again on 12 September 1950, starting the first major construction project of Deutsche Bundesbahn, which was founded in 1949, when the cutting, which had been largely unused since 1914, was deepened by 50 centimetres to make more space for the planned electrification.

=== New through station in 1955 ===
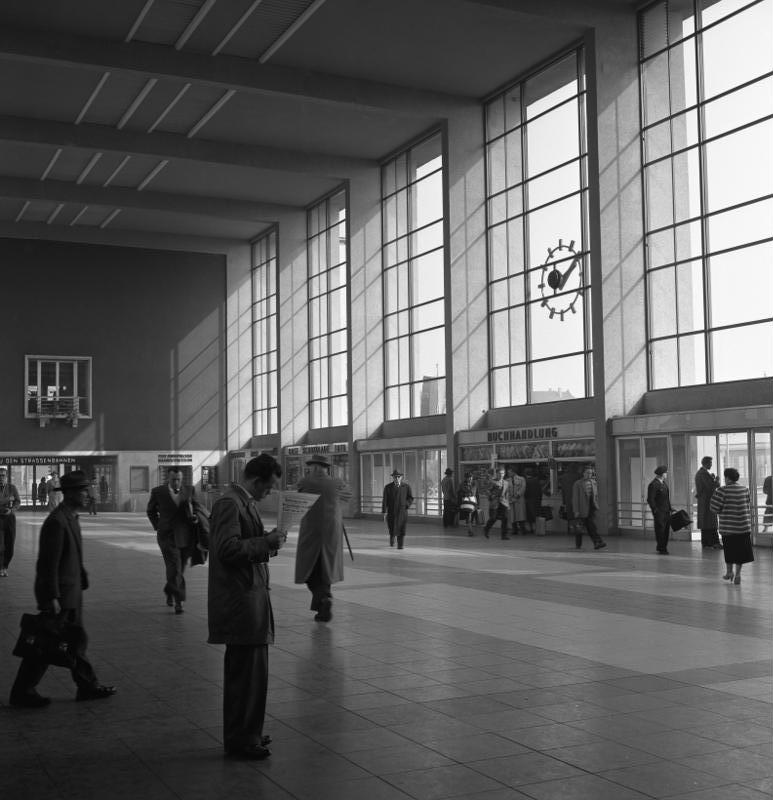
Main hall of the new entrance building (1957)

On 5 May 1955, the new Hauptbahnhof was opened by Federal President Theodor Heuss. The President, who had lived for some years in Heidelberg, had arrived in Heidelberg on a special train from Bruchsal. The actual operations of the station commenced on the night of 7 and 8 May. This meant that two embankments, which temporarily connected to the old station, had to be removed. The tracks to the new station had already been built between the embankments. In the first days after the start of operation there were teething problems that were attributed to technical problems with the switches and the lack of experience of the personnel with the new facilities. 18 long-distance services stopped at Heidelberg in the new timetable; these had previously bypassed the city because of the congestion at the old station.

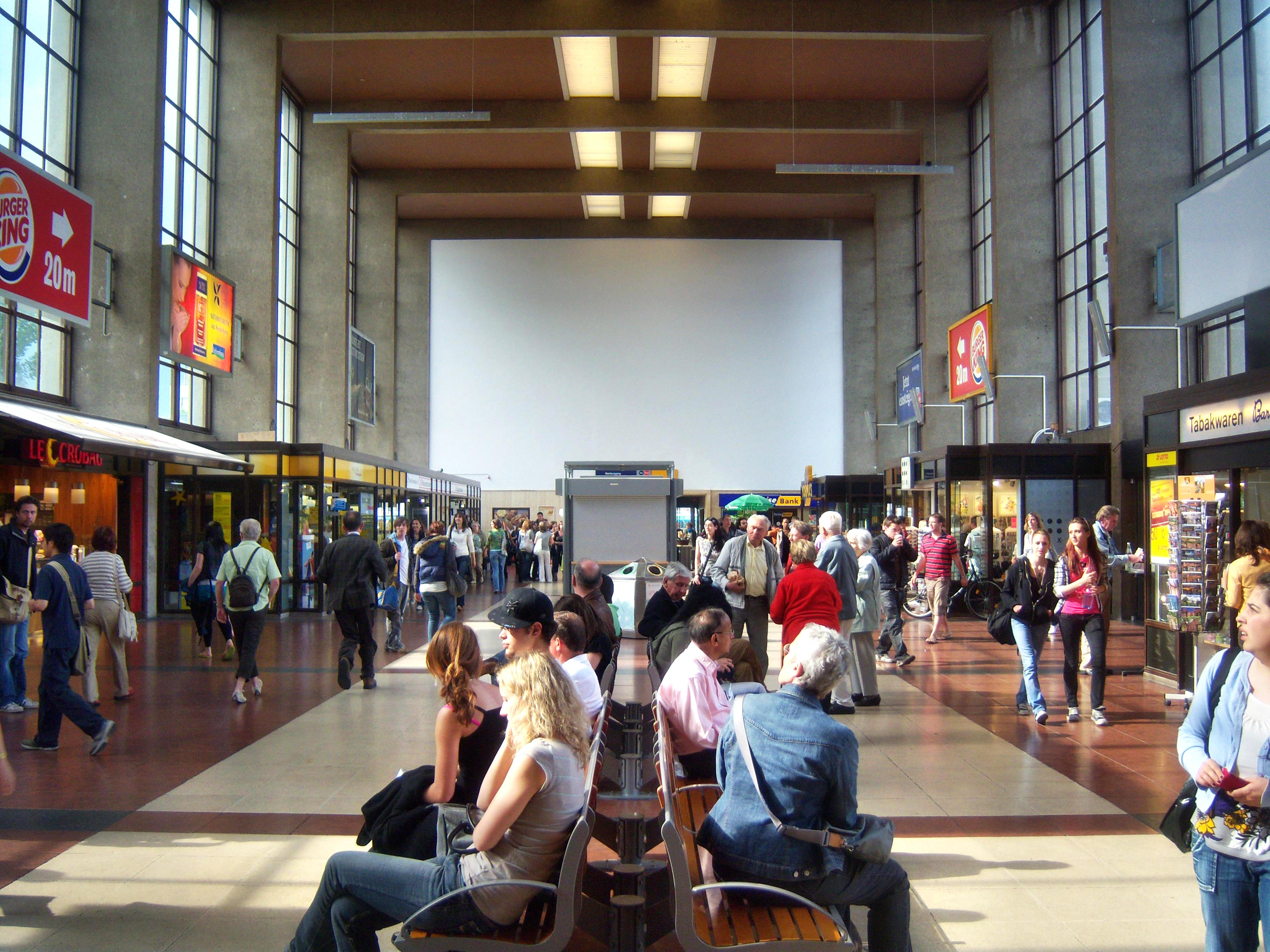
Interior of the new station

The station building of the new station was designed by Deutsche Bundesbahn director Helmuth Conradi (1903–1973), who in the 1920s had studied architecture under Paul Schmitthenner and Paul Bonatz of the Stuttgart School of architecture (particularly associated with Stuttgart Hauptbahnhof). The ticket hall was built with glazed longitudinal walls at an angle of 50 degrees to the tracks, as designed by Hans Freese during the Nazi period. On the south wall, which is of 53 metres long, 16 metres wide and 12 metres high, there is a sgraffito by Karl Joseph Huber on the theme of motion ("Helios with the Sun Chariot", Helios mit dem Sonnenwagen). A second section of the building was laid parallel to the tracks with rooms for the reception of luggage and express freight, waiting rooms and the station restaurant on the ground floor and offices for the railway administration on the upper floors. Located in the angle between two sections of the building there is a spiral staircase connecting to both sections. Extending from the station building to the platforms is a 91 metre long and 20 metre wide hall. The roof of the hall was built with curved surfaces made of prestressed concrete and filled with glass.

At its inauguration in 1955, the station building was criticised by some as a "glass case of inaccessibility." A later commentator commended the concourse hall for its "architectural and operational excellence”. The long glass facades have an “elegance and lightness" previously unknown in railway buildings and they were said to correspond to the "ideals of the architecture of the 1950s: transparency, lightness and spaciousness." Here, the modernity of the glass facade stands in contrast to the vertical structure of the reception hall façade with its relatively strong, neo-classical concrete roof supports, according to a publication of the State Historical Monuments Office (Landesamt für Denkmalpflege) of Baden-Württemberg in 2010.

The central relay interlocking panel was housed in the entrance building. It replaced the old station's ten signal boxes. The number of signal boxes in the station area was reduced from 45 to seven. On the west side there was a separate area with another platform for the United States Army. Two baggage tunnels were built for the loading of baggage and mail trains. Instead of the, until then usual, lifts there were connecting ramps to the platforms. In order to park trains coming from the west and terminating in Heidelberg, a set of 12 carriage sidings, a carriage washing facility and a carriage workshop were established near the engine depot. Another set of carriage sidings were established east of the station with four sidings.

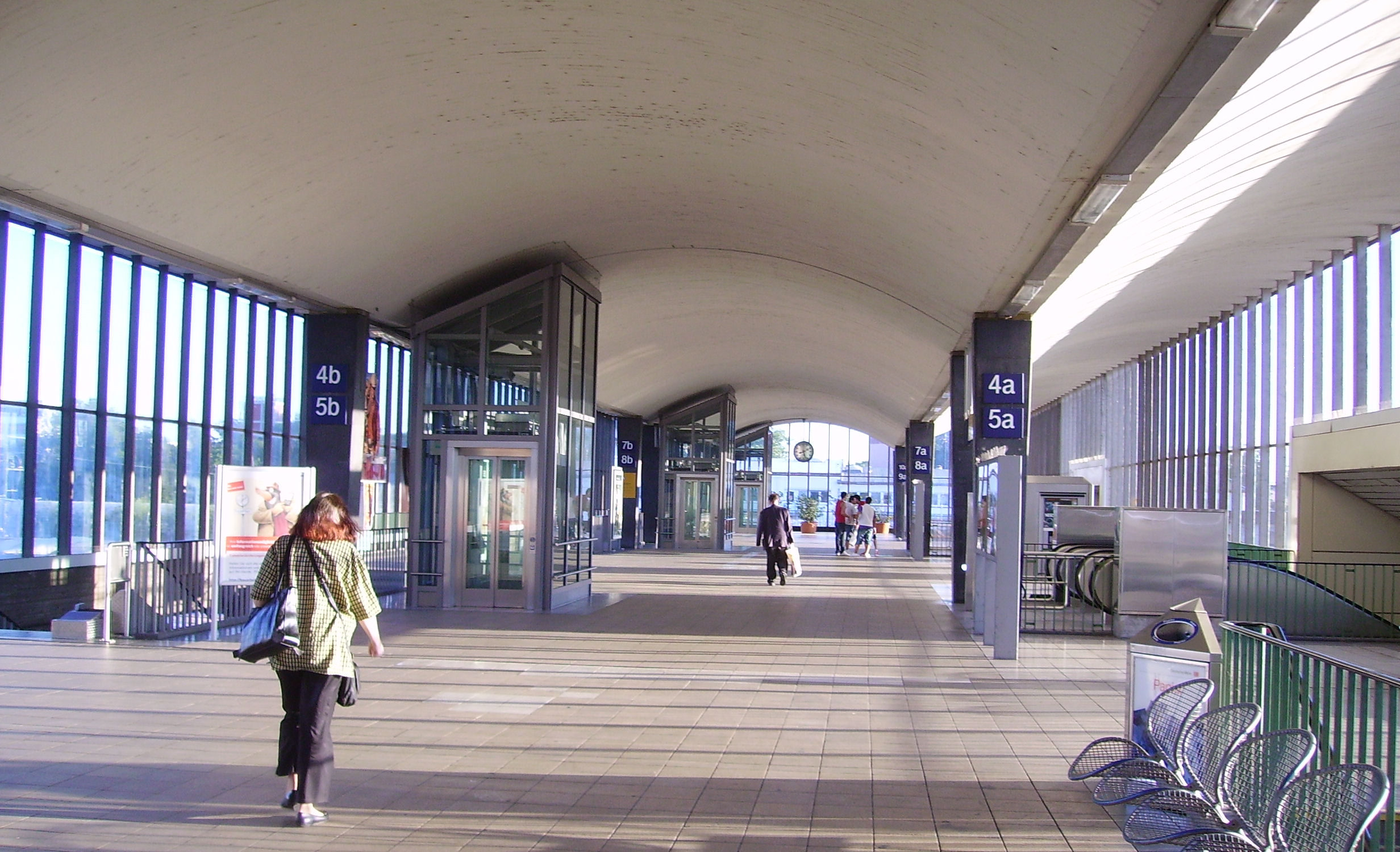
Hallway over the platforms in 2008 after the installation of escalators and lifts

Since the new Heidelberg station was fully electrified in 1955, electric shunting locomotives are used. The first locomotives based in Heidelberg were class E69, which were replaced in 1964 by class E60 locomotives. Also stationed in Heidelberg depot from 1962 were the first express locomotives of class E 10.12 and regional electric multiple units of class ET 56. The operation of steam locomotives to Heidelberg ended in 1965 and the coal handling facilities were closed in 1968. As of 1970 only shunting locomotives and railcars were maintained in Heidelberg; in May 1989 the depot was closed.

The closure of the branch line to Schwetzingen in 1966 was followed in the 1990s by the ending of the operation of many long-distance services via Heidelberg. In the spring of 2003, lifts were installed between the cross-platform hall and the platforms to provide barrier-free access for the disabled. As early as 1987, escalators were installed on the platforms for intercity traffic. In December 2003, Heidelberg station became a node on the Rhine-Neckar S-Bahn. The signal control centre lost its function in 2006, since signal control operations in the south west region of Deutsche Bahn were centralised in Karlsruhe. The signal control centre building remained unchanged until its eventual demolition in 2024.

The abandonment of the carriage of mail by rail in July 1997 led to closure of the railway post office, which was located south of Montpellier bridge, near the station. Also in 1997, the marshalling yard and freight yard in Heidelberg were abandoned in favour of the Mannheim yard. The station was originally designed with a capacity of 2,500 cars per day, but now handled from 400 to 500 cars per day. Construction started in 2010 on the new district of Bahnstadt (railway town) on the grounds of the former freight yard and the operations depot. In order to develop the Bahnstadt, an extension of the hall of the station concourse to the south was completed.

=== Use of the old station site ===
The opening of the new Heidelberg Hauptbahnhof in May 1955 made 24 hectares (59 acres) of railway land available. The City Council developed a master plan in the early 1950s revising the plans from the Nazi era: it envisaged the construction of a generously proportioned east–west link road, the Kurfürstenanlage, which is up to 70 metres (230 ft) wide. About 60% of the vacant space was used for the construction of streets and squares. Carl Neinhaus, who had been removed in 1945 by the American authorities during denazification, was re-elected mayor of Heidelberg in 1952 and expressed the hope in 1955 that the new link road would become a lively street with shops in a relatively short time and that it would emerge a "calling card of the city”.

In July 1956, a tram line was opened along the Kurfürstenanlage to the new station. The construction of the road has been gradual, particularly the building of administrative buildings along it, including the district court of Heidelberg. In the early 1960s, the Menglerbau tower block was built on the site of the former station and it is still the only residential high-rise in Heidelberg. In 1990, the Berufsgenossenschaft Chemie (chemical trades association) building was established in the new station forecourt, now named after Willy Brandt. The Print Media Academy, an office and training centre of Heidelberger Druckmaschinen, was opened in 2000; the S-Printing Horse, the largest horse sculpture in the world, is located in front of it. Since May 1993, the tram station lies to the immediate north of the entrance building; this is also served by the interurban trains of the Oberrheinischen Eisenbahn-Gesellschaft (Upper Rhine Railway Company, OEG). For this purpose, the OEG track towards Wieblingen was laid and connected at the Hauptbahnhof to the tram network.

The urban development of Kurfürstenanlage was described as "sobering” in 2010. The hoped-for shops, cafes and restaurants have failed. The road is unattractive for pedestrians due to its high volume of traffic. The Rhein-Neckar-Zeitung newspaper stated in 1995 that the station “lies a little too far off, out in the west” (nach wie vor etwas abseits‚ draußen im Westen), without the expected strong pull. The anticipated integration of the districts of Bergheim and Weststadt on the Kurfürstenanlage had failed according to the Heidelberg local newspaper.

== Renovation ==
According to Deutsche Bahn, "the entire station building is in dire need of renovation. Due to usage adjustments and technical changes, several functions that were originally integrated into the station building have been gradually abandoned or relocated to other locations as well." According to plans, this renovation will be realized through both general repairs and an expansion of services to serve modern usage. The first part of this work was carried out by the city of Heidelberg and its private partners, through the integration of the station to the new Bahnstadt neighborhood just south of the existing tracks. This included new offices, commercial space, a subterranean bicycle parking garage, a hotel, and apartments, as well as a new bridge linking the existing pedestrian platform access to these amenities.

The planning work from Deutsche Bahn for their portion of the project began in 2025 and main works are scheduled to begin in the second half of 2026. They are scheduled to last for 26 months.

== Services ==
=== Long-distance ===
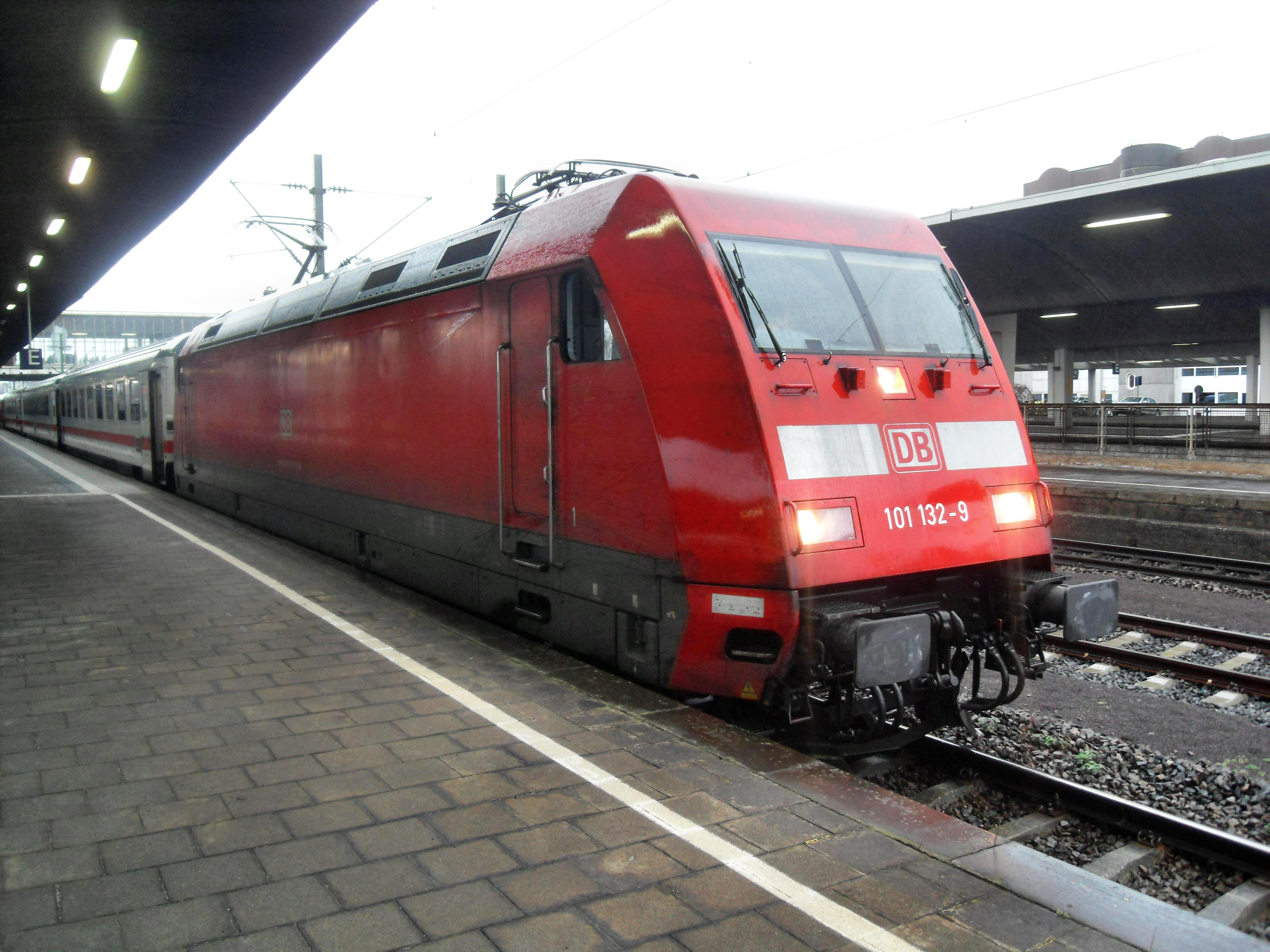
EuroCity in Heidelberg Hauptbahnhof

The station serves the major economic centre and popular tourist town of Heidelberg and is part of Deutsche Bahn's long-distance network. It is served by Intercity and Euro City trains as well as individual Intercity-Express trains. In the 2026 timetable, the following services stop at the station:

| Line | Route | | Frequency |
|---|---|---|---|
| ICE 11 | Berlin Gesundbrunnen – Berlin – Erfurt – Frankfurt – Frankfurt Airport – Mannheim – Heidelberg – Stuttgart – Augsburg – Munich | | Once a day |
| ICE 13 | Berlin Ostbahnhof – Berlin – Wolfsburg – Braunschweig – Kassel – Frankfurt South – Darmstadt – Heidelberg – | Karlsruhe | Every 4 hours |
| ICE 13 | Berlin Ostbahnhof – Berlin – Wolfsburg – Braunschweig – Kassel – Frankfurt South – Darmstadt – Heidelberg – | Stuttgart | Every 4 hours |
| ICE 22 | (Kiel –) Hamburg – Hanover – Göttingen – Kassel-Wilhelmshöhe – Frankfurt – Frankfurt Airport – Mannheim – Heidelberg – Stuttgart | | 1 train pair |
| ICE 26 | Bremen – Hannover – Göttingen – Kassel-Wilhelmshöhe – Gießen – Frankfurt – Darmstadt – Heidelberg – Bruchsal – Karlsruhe | | Every 4 hours |
| IC 34 | (Stuttgart – Pforzheim – Karlsruhe – Heidelberg – Mannheim - Frankfurt-Flughafen – )Frankfurt – Wetzlar – Siegen – Siegen – Kreuztal – Finnentrop – Iserlohn – Witten – Dortmund | | Mon–Fri: 1 train (at night) |
| IC 35 | Norddeich Mole – Norddeich – Emden – Münster – Recklinghausen – Gelsenkirchen – Oberhausen – Duisburg – (Düsseldorf Airport–) Düsseldorf – Köln – Bonn – Koblenz – Mainz – Mannheim – Heidelberg – Vaihingen (Enz) – Stuttgart | | 1 train pair on the weekend |
| ICE 42 | Dortmund – Essen – Duisburg – Düsseldorf – Cologne – Cologne/Bonn Airport – Siegburg/Bonn – Montabaur – Wiesbaden – Mainz – Frankfurt am Main – Mannheim – Heidelberg – Bruchsal – Karlsruhe – Vaihingen – Ludwigsburg – Stuttgart – Ulm – Augsburg – Munich | | 1 train pair |
| ICE 45 | Cologne – Cologne/Bonn Airport – Wiesbaden – Mainz – Mannheim – Heidelberg – Stuttgart | | 1 train pair (Mon–Fri) |
| IC 51 | Leipzig – Weimar – Erfurt – Gotha – Eisenach – Fulda – Frankfurt (Main) Süd – Darmstadt – Heidelberg – Karlsruhe | | 1 train (Sun) |
| ICE 55; IC 55 | Dresden – Dresden-Neustadt – Riesa – Leipzig – Leipzig/Halle Airport – Halle – Köthen – Magdeburg – Helmstedt – Braunschweig – Hanover – Minden – Bad Oeynhausen – Herford – Bielefeld – Gütersloh – Hamm – Dortmund – Hagen – Wuppertal – Solingen – Cologne – Bonn – Koblenz – Mainz – Mannheim – Heidelberg – Vaihingen (Enz) – Stuttgart | | Every 2 hours |
| ICE 55; IC 55 | Dortmund – Essen – Düsseldorf – Cologne – Bonn – Koblenz – Mainz – Mannheim – Heidelberg – Vaihingen – Stuttgart – Ulm – Oberstdorf | | 1 train pair |
| ICE 62 | Frankfurt – Darmstadt – Weinheim – Heidelberg – Stuttgart – Munich – Salzburg – Villach – Klagenfurt – Graz | | 2 train pairs |
| ICE 62 | Dortmund – Bochum – Essen – Duisburg – Düsseldorf – Köln Messe/Deutz – Frankfurt Airport – Mannheim – Heidelberg – Stuttgart – Ulm – Friedrichshafen Stadt – Lindau-Reutin – Bregenz – St. Anton – Innsbruck | | 1 train pair |
| IC 87 | Frankfurt – Heidelberg – Stuttgart – Singen (– Zürich/Konstanz) | | Individual services |
| FLX 10 | Berlin Hbf – Berlin Südkreuz – Halle (Saale) – Erfurt – Gotha – Eisenach – Fulda – Frankfurt South – Darmstadt – Heidelberg – Stuttgart | | 1–2 train pairs |

=== Regional services ===
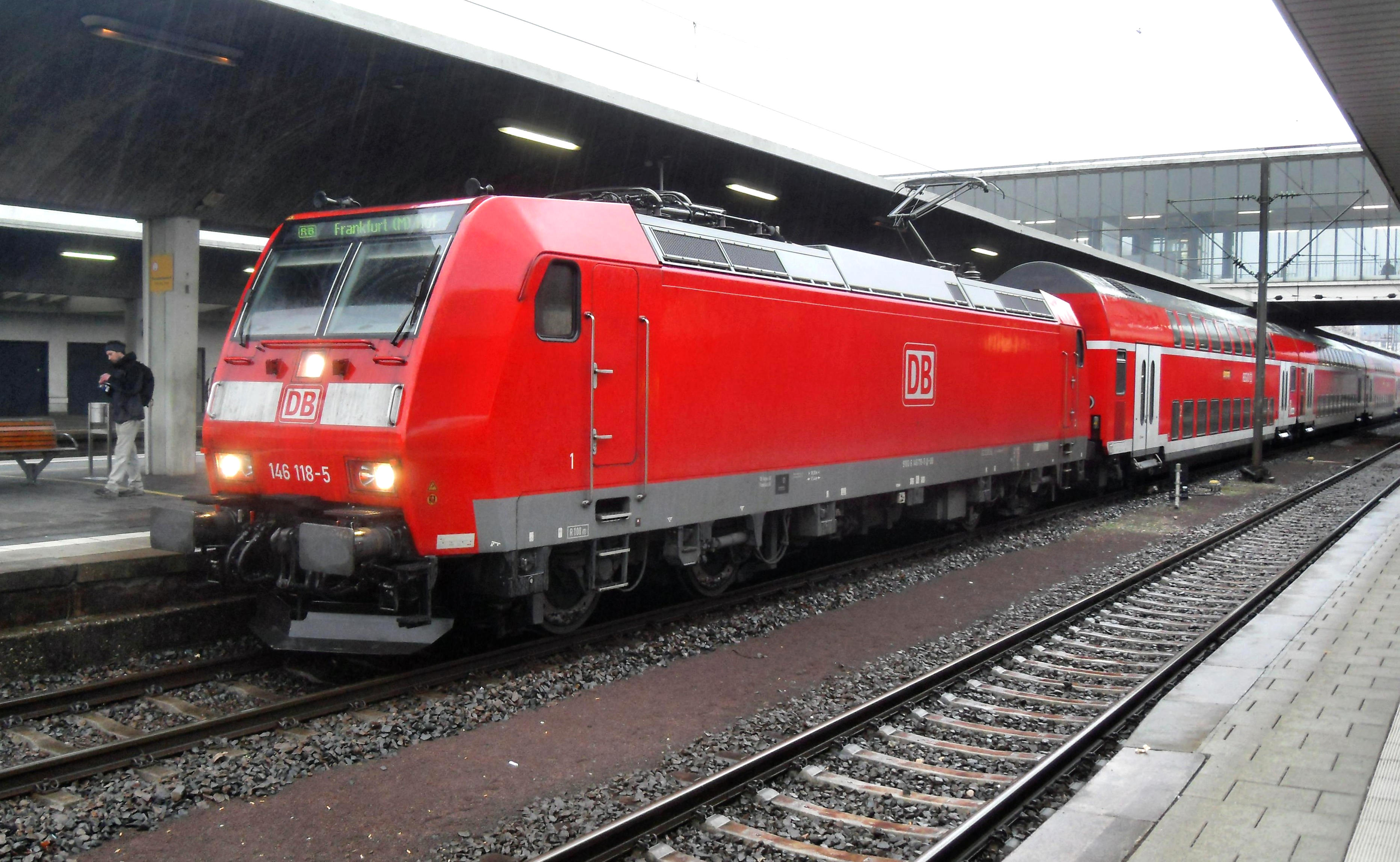
RegionalBahn service with electric locomotive of the Bombardier Traxx type in Heidelberg station on its way to Frankfurt over the Main-Neckar Railway

In local rail passenger transport, there is an hourly Regionalbahn service via Darmstadt to Frankfurt, as well as Monday to Friday to Wiesloch-Walldorf via Heidelberg-Kirchheim/Rohrbach, two Regional-Express services to Heilbronn, each running every two hours alternately via Sinsheim or Eberbach and Mosbach-Neckarelz, as well as an hourly Regional-Express service to Karlsruhe. In the 2026 timetable, the following services stop at the station:

| Line | Route | Frequency |
|---|---|---|
| RE 1 | Heidelberg – Mannheim – Neustadt – Homburg – Saarbrücken – Trier – Koblenz | One train pair |
| RE 10a | Mannheim – Heidelberg – Eberbach – Mosbach-Neckarelz – Bad Friedrichshall – Heilbronn | Every two hours |
| RE 10b | Mannheim – Heidelberg – Meckesheim – Sinsheim – Bad Friedrichshall – Heilbronn | Every two hours |
| RE 40 | Mannheim – Heidelberg – Wiesloch-Walldorf – Bruchsal – Karlsruhe – Freudenstadt | One train pair |
| RE 73 | (Mannheim –) Heidelberg – Wiesloch-Walldorf – Bruchsal –Karlsruhe | Hourly |
| RB 68 | Frankfurt am Main – Darmstadt – Bensheim – Weinheim – Neu-Edingen/Friedrichsfeld – Heidelberg – Wiesloch-Walldorf | Hourly |

=== Rhine-Neckar S-Bahn ===
Heidelberg Hauptbahnhof is also significant for regional transportation. It has been a major node on the Rhine-Neckar S-Bahn, operated by DB Regio since 2003.

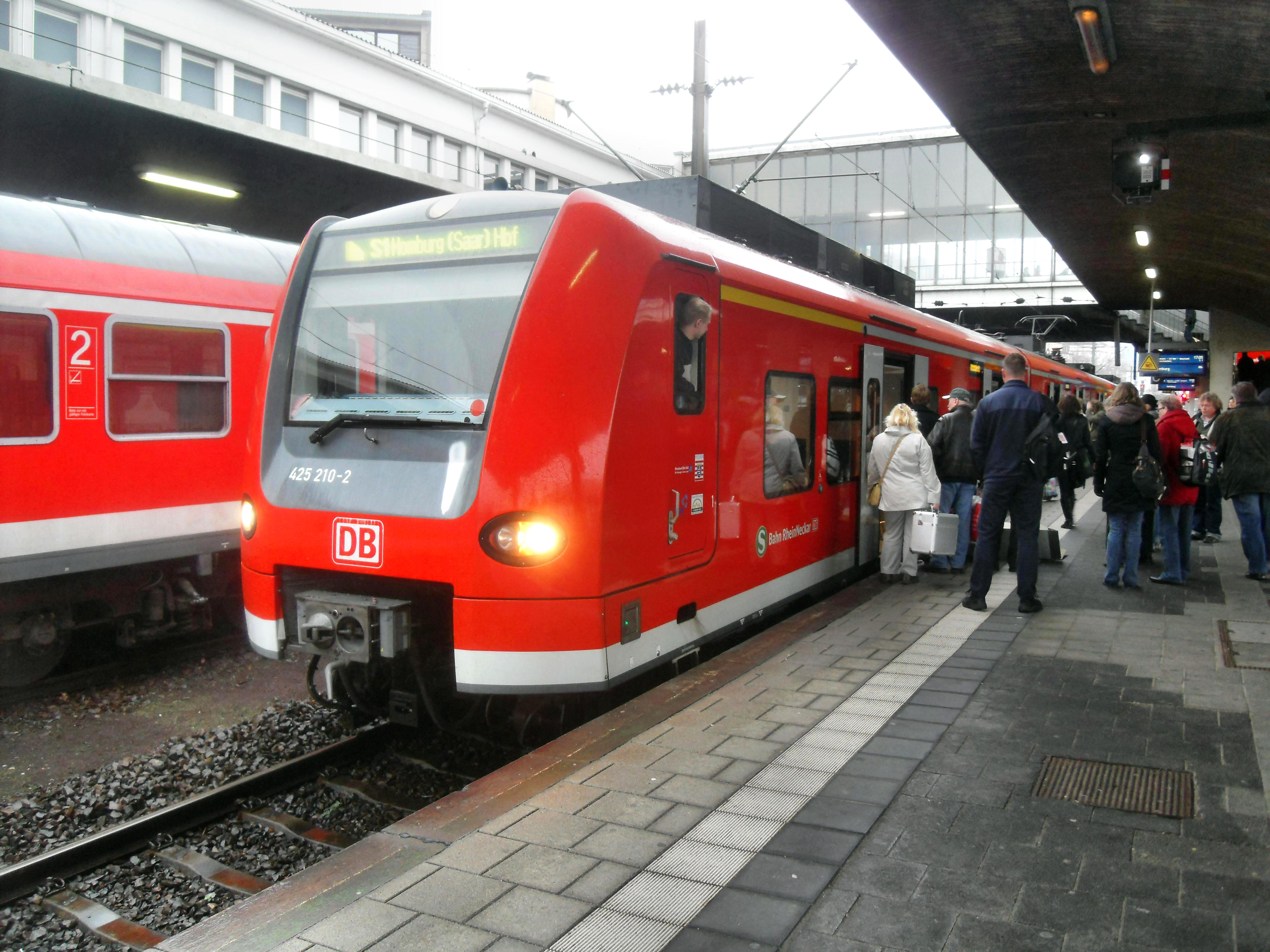
Service on line S1 of the Rhine-Neckar S-Bahn operated with Class 425 EMU on the way to Homburg (Saar)

| Line | Route |
|---|---|
| S1 | Homburg (Saar) – Kaiserslautern – Neustadt (Weinstr) – Ludwigshafen (Rhein) – Mannheim – Heidelberg – Neckargemünd – Eberbach – Mosbach (Baden) – Osterburken |
| S2 | Kaiserslautern – Neustadt (Weinstr) – Ludwigshafen (Rhein) – Mannheim – Heidelberg – Neckargemünd – Eberbach – (Mosbach (Baden) ) |
| S3 | Germersheim – Speyer – Ludwigshafen (Rhein) – Mannheim – Heidelberg – Wiesloch-Walldorf – Bruchsal – Karlsruhe |
| S4 | Germersheim – Speyer – Ludwigshafen (Rhein) – Mannheim – Heidelberg – Wiesloch-Walldorf – Bruchsal |
| S5 | Heidelberg – Neckargemünd – Meckesheim – Sinsheim (Elsenz) – Eppingen |
| S51 | (Mannheim – ) Heidelberg – Aglasterhausen |

=== Long-distance buses ===
An intercity coach service is also provided, where different companies such as Flixbus and Deinbus connect Heidelberg with several national and international destinations.

== See also ==
- Rail transport in Germany
- Railway stations in Germany

== Notes ==
=== References ===
- Berger, Manfred (1988). Historische Bahnhofsbauten III: Bayern, Baden, Württemberg, Pfalz, Nassau Hessen [Historical Railway Stations III] (in German). Berlin: Transpress. ISBN 3-344-00267-8.
- Feitenhansl, Roland (2010). "Avantgarde gestern und heute. Bahnhofsbauten der 1950er Jahre in Baden-Württemberg" (PDF). Denkmalpflege in Baden-Württemberg. Nachrichtenblatt der Landesdenkmalpflege (in German). 39 (3): 134–139. ISSN 0342-0027. Archived from the original (PDF, 6.5 MB) on 2014-05-13.
- Kaiser, Joseph (2005). 50 Jahre neuer Heidelberger Hauptbahnhof/Von den Anfängen bis zum modernsten Bahnhof Deutschlands [50 years of the new Heidelberg Hauptbahnhof: from the beginnings to the most modern station in Germany] (in German). Ludwigshafen: Pro Message. ISBN 3-934845-25-8.
- Lurz, Meinholf (1978). Erweiterung und Neugestaltung der Heidelberger Stadtmitte [Expansion and Renovation of Heidelberg City Centre]. Neue Hefte zur Stadtentwicklung und Stadtgeschichte (in German). Vol. 1. Heidelberg: Brausdruck. ISBN 3-921524-99-7.
- Muth, Frank (2003). Straßenbahnen in Heidelberg. 100 Jahre "Blau-Weiße" in der Neckarstadt (in German). Munich: GeraMond. ISBN 3-7654-7197-6.
- Pressedienst der Bundesbahndirektion Karlsruhe (1955). 115 Jahre Bahnhof Heidelberg 1840–1955. Festschrift zur Eröffnung des Heidelberger Hauptbahnhofs am 5. Mai 1955 (in German). Heidelberg: Hüthig & Dreyer.
