= Aglasterhausen station =

Railway station in Aglasterhausen, Germany

Aglasterhausen
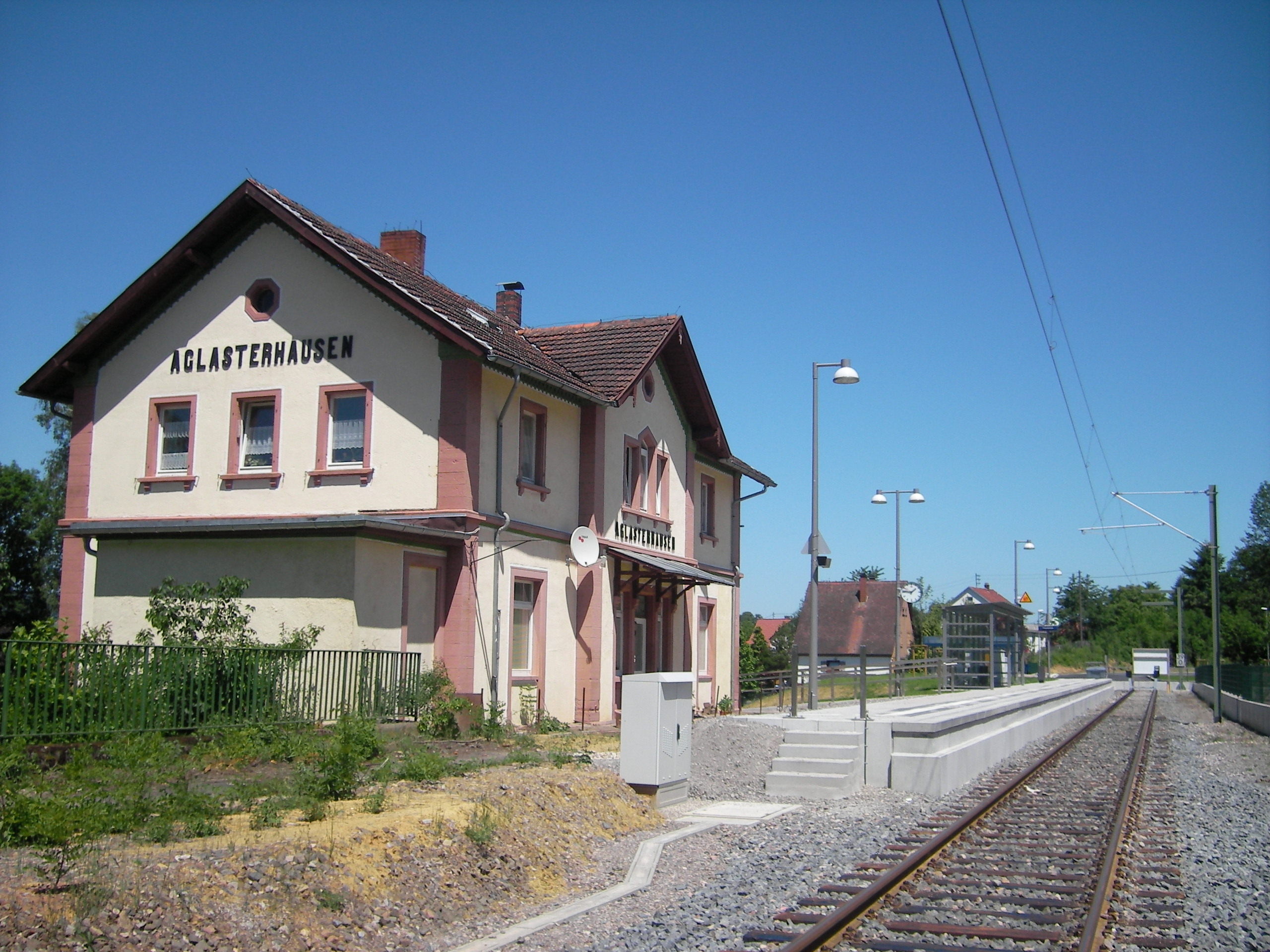
- Aglasterhausen station

General information
- Location: Bahnhofstraße 40, Aglasterhausen, Baden-Württemberg; Germany
- Coordinates: 49°21′00″N 8°59′27″E
- Owner: Deutsche Bahn
- Operator: DB Station&Service
- Line: Meckesheim–Neckarelz railway (km 38.9)
- Platforms: 1

Construction
- Accessible: Yes

Other information
- Station code: 8168
- DS100 code: RAG
- IBNR: 8007445
- Category: 7
- Fare zone: VRN: 270
- Website: www.bahnhof.de

History
- Opened: 23 October 1862

Services
Preceding station	Rhine-Neckar S-Bahn	Following station
Helmstadt (Baden) towards Heidelberg Hbf	S51	Terminus
Location

Aglasterhausen station is the terminus of the Meckesheim–Neckarelz railway in Aglasterhausen in the German state of Baden-Württemberg. It has one platform and is located in the network administered by the Verkehrsverbund Rhein-Neckar (VRN). It is classified by Deutsche Bahn as a category 7 station.

It was opened with the Odenwald Railway (Odenwaldbahn) from Heidelberg to Würzburg as a through station on 23 October 1862. The section from Aglasterhausen to Obrigheim was closed on 25 September 1971, turning Aglasterhausen station into a terminus. It has been the terminus of line S51 of the Rhine-Neckar S-Bahn since June 2010.

== History ==
The Grand Duchy of Baden State Railway, which operated railways in Baden from 1840 to 1920, when it was integrated into Deutsche Reichsbahn, commenced operations of the Baden Odenwald railway between Heidelberg, Meckenheim, Aglasterhausen and Mosbach on 23 October 1862. With the opening of the Neckar Valley Railway on the Neckargemünd–Neckarsteinach–Eberbach–Neckarelz–Mosbach route on 24 May 1879, the Meckenheim–Neckarelz route became more and more neglected. The Aglasterhausen–Obrigheim section was closed at the timetable change on 25 September 1971. Südwestdeutsche Verkehrs-Aktiengesellschaft (SWEG) took over the line from Deutsche Bundesbahn under a fixed 20-year lease on 1 January 1982.

With the transfer of responsibility for the Elsenz Valley Railway and the Schwarzbach Valley Railway to the Rhine-Neckar S-Bahn, the line was electrified, Aglasterhausen station was completely modernised and a raised platform was installed there. At the same time, the second track (formerly used for loading timber) was removed. The track now ends at a buffer stop.

The original station building still exists and it has been renovated.

== Operations ==
The station is served by line S 51 of the Rhine-Neckar S-Bahn every hour from 5am to midnight, Monday to Friday, with extra trains in the peaks. The extra trains run only between Aglasterhausen and Meckesheim. Class 425 EMUs are used.

Line	Route	Frequency
S51	(Heidelberg Hbf – Neckargemünd –) Meckesheim – Waibstadt – Aglasterhausen	Hourly (+ an extra train during the peak hour)
