= St Ilgen-Sandhausen station =

Railway station in Leimen, Germany

St. Ilgen/Sandhausen
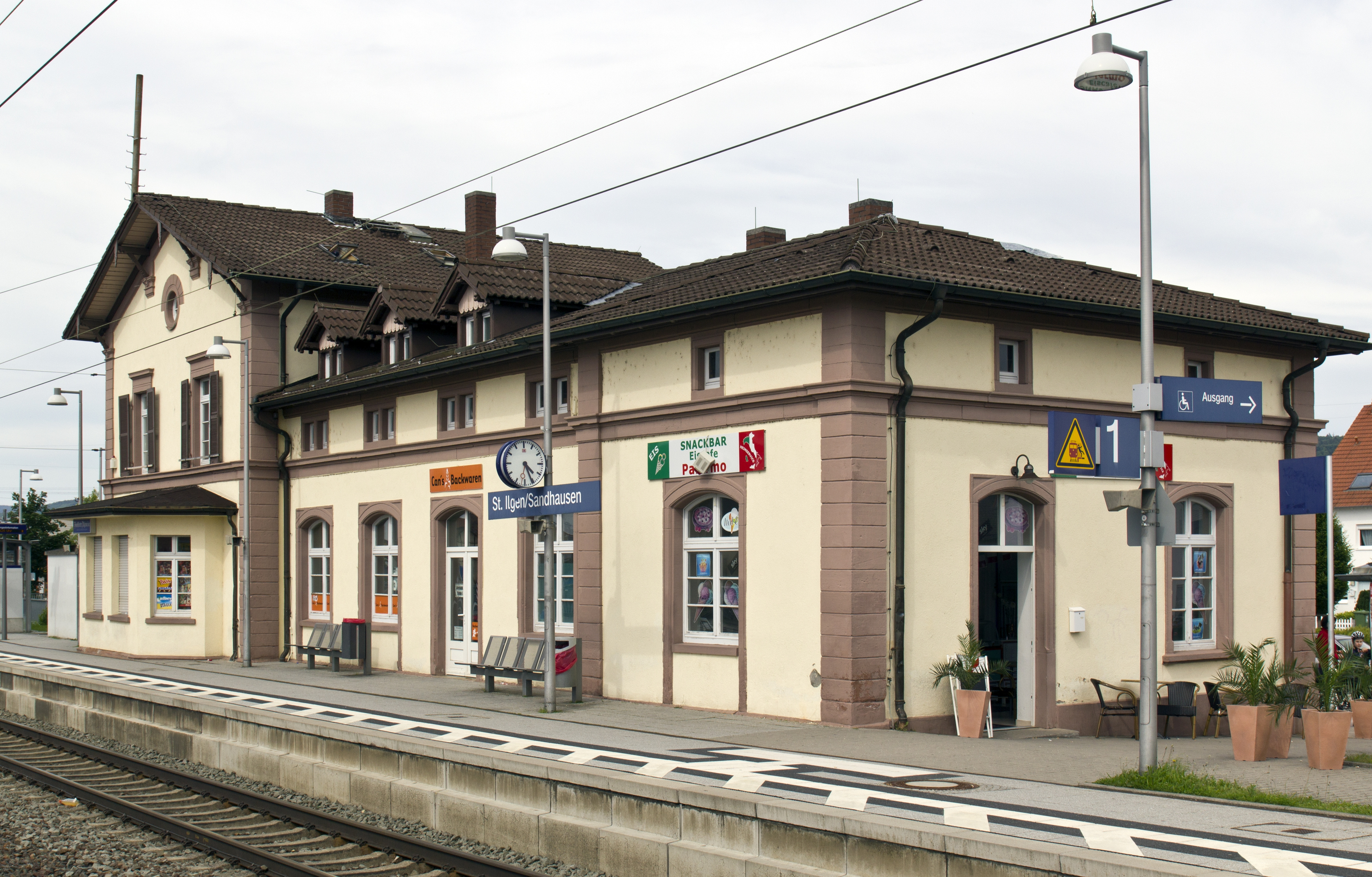
- 2013

General information
- Location: Bahnhofstraße 57; 69181 Leimen; Baden-Württemberg; Germany
- Coordinates: 49.3412°N 8.6689°E
- Elevation: 106 m (348 ft)
- System: Hp
- Owner: Deutsche Bahn
- Operator: DB Station&Service
- Lines: Mannheim–Karlsruhe–Basel railway (KBS 701)
- Platforms: 2 side platforms
- Tracks: 2
- Train operators: DB Regio Mitte; S-Bahn RheinNeckar
- Connections: RB 68; S3S4; 725 751 758 759

Construction
- Parking: yes
- Cycle facilities: yes
- Accessible: yes

Other information
- Station code: 5941
- DS100 code: RSIG
- IBNR: 8005648
- Category: 5
- Fare zone: VRN: 145
- Website: www.bahnhof.de

Services
Preceding station	DB Regio Mitte	Following station
Heidelberg-Kirchheim/Rohrbach towards Frankfurt (Main) Hbf	RB 68	Wiesloch-Walldorf Terminus
Preceding station	Rhine-Neckar S-Bahn	Following station
Heidelberg-Kirchheim/Rohrbach towards Germersheim	S3	Wiesloch-Walldorf towards Karlsruhe Hbf
Heidelberg-Kirchheim/Rohrbach towards Ludwigshafen (Rhein) BASF Nord	S4	Wiesloch-Walldorf towards Ludwigshafen (Rhein) Hbf
Location
- Location within Baden-Württemberg Location within Germany Location within Europe

St. Ilgen/Sandhausen station (German: Haltepunkt St. Ilgen/Sandhausen) is a railway station in the municipality of Leimen, located in the Rhein-Neckar-Kreis in Baden-Württemberg, Germany.
