= Heidelberg-Kirchheim/Rohrbach station =

Railway station in Germany

Heidelberg Kirchheim/Rohrbach
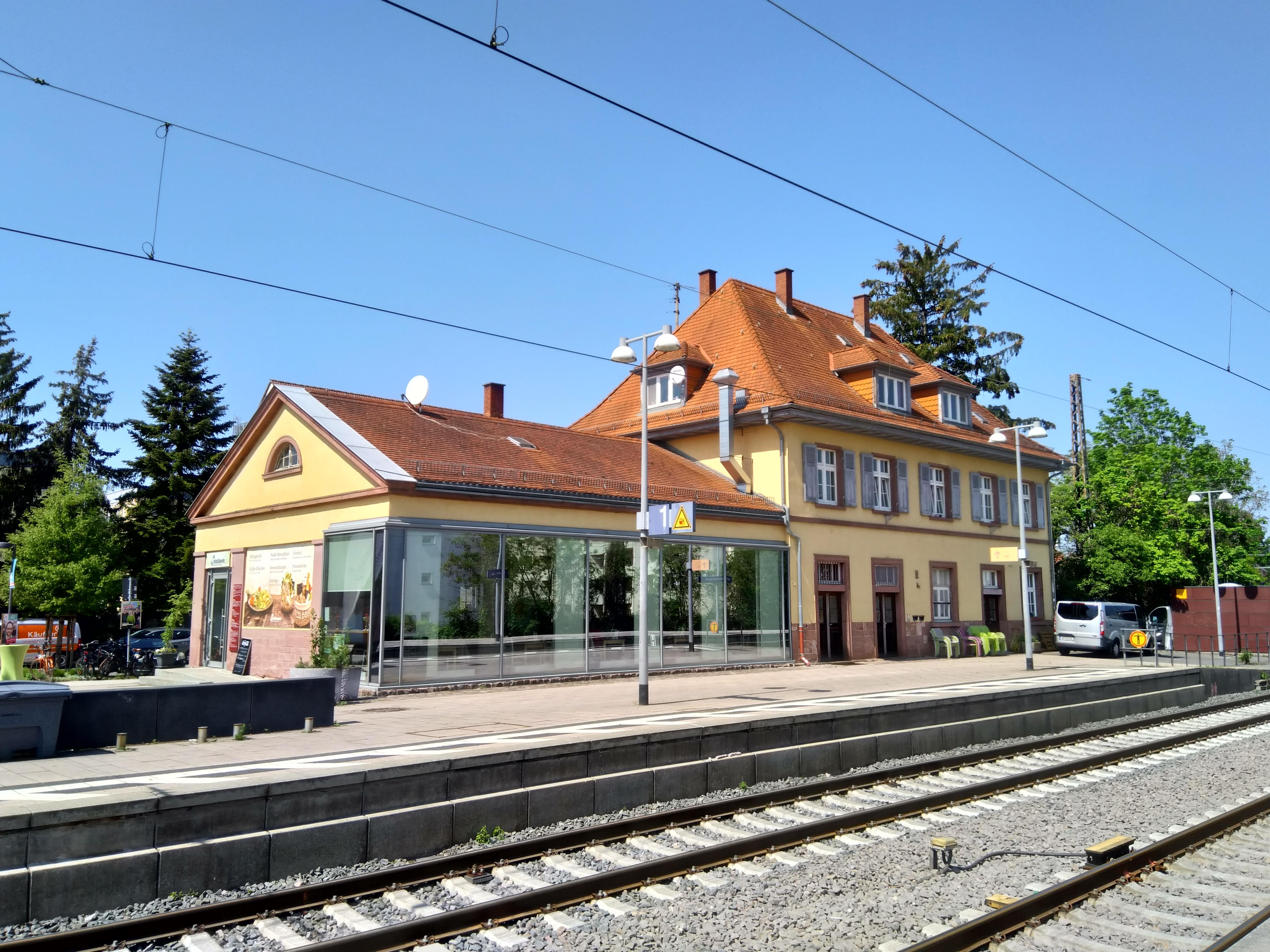
- Former Station Building

General information
- Location: Hardstraße 1, 69124 Heidelberg-Kirchheim, Baden-Württemberg, Germany
- Coordinates: 49°22′48″N 8°40′31″E
- Line: Rhine Valley Railway (km 22.1)
- Tracks: 3

Construction
- Accessible: Yes

Other information
- Station code: 2630
- DS100 code: RHKM
- IBNR: 8002686
- Category: 4
- Fare zone: VRN: 125 and 145
- Website: www.bahnhof.de

History
- Opened: 1865

Services
Preceding station	DB Regio Mitte	Following station
Heidelberg Hbf towards Frankfurt (Main) Hbf	RB 68	St Ilgen-Sandhausen towards Wiesloch-Walldorf
Preceding station	Rhine-Neckar S-Bahn	Following station
Heidelberg Hbf towards Germersheim	S3	St Ilgen-Sandhausen towards Karlsruhe Hbf
Heidelberg Hbf towards Ludwigshafen (Rhein) BASF Nord	S4	St Ilgen-Sandhausen towards Ludwigshafen (Rhein) Hbf
Location

Heidelberg-Kirchheim/Rohrbach station is the second busiest station after Heidelberg Hauptbahnhof in the city of Heidelberg in the German state of Baden-Württemberg. It is classified by Deutsche Bahn (DB) as a category 4 station. It has three platforms and it is in the area where fares are set by the Verkehrsverbund Rhein-Neckar (Rhine-Neckar Transport Association, VRN). Since December 2003, it has been almost exclusively served by services on lines S3 and S4 of the Rhine-Neckar S-Bahn.

== Location and amenities ==
Heidelberg-Kirchheim/Rohrbach station is located along the railway from Heidelberg to Karlsruhe (Rhine Valley Railway, Rheintalbahn) between the two Heidelberg districts of Kirchheim and Rohrbach.

A bridge carries Bürgerstraße (street) over the station and connects Kirchheim and Rohrbach together. Bus route 33 stops on this bridge.

The station includes about 25 parking spaces, bicycle parking and access for the disabled.

== History ==
The Heidelberg–Bruchsal–Karlsruhe section of the Rhine Valley Railway passing through Kirchheim was opened on 10 April 1843 by the Baden State Railways. However, initially there was no station in Kirchheim. It received its own station in 1865. The current station building was built in 1914 and is heritage-listed.

Initially, the trains to Kirchheim ran over a connecting curve from the old Heidelberg station, which was opened as a terminus. Problems caused by the partial conversion of Heidelberg station into a through station in 1862 and a lack of opportunities for expansion meant that a new through station was built in the mid 20th century on a new site that was over a kilometre to the west. The line to the old station was closed and a new line was built to the new main station (Hauptbahnhof).

In 2003, following the integration of Rhine Valley Railway to Karlsruhe in the network of Rhine-Neckar S-Bahn, the platforms were made accessible for the disabled. At the same time, the station was renamed Heidelberg-Kirchheim/Rohrbach. Regular S-Bahn services commenced at the 2003/2004 timetable change on 14 December 2003 and it has been integrated in the S-Bahn network ever since.

=== Platforms ===
The platforms were modernised during the integration of the station into the Rhine-Neckar S-Bahn network. Platform 1 has two different entry heights, while platforms 2 and 3 have three different entry heights.

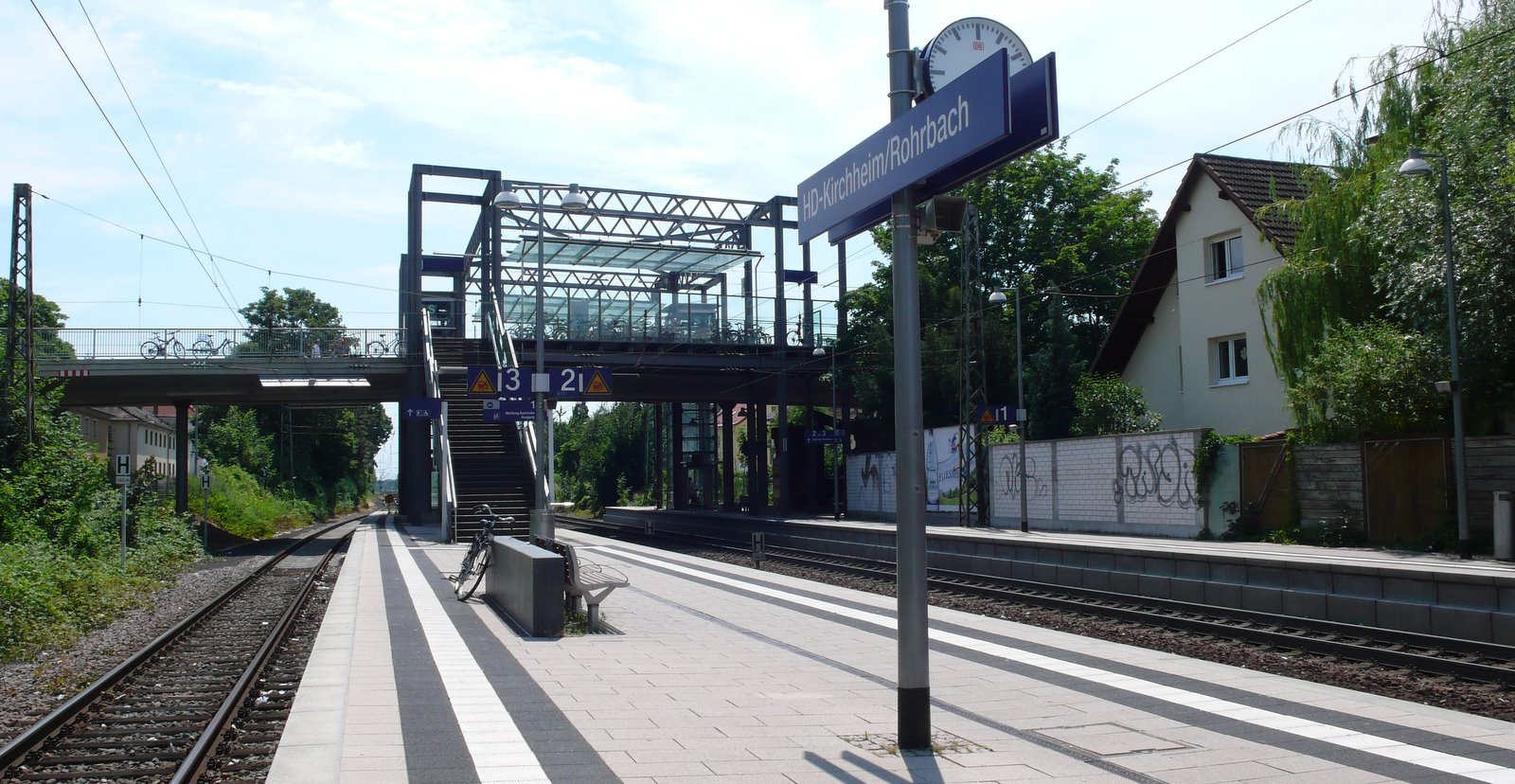
Platforms 2/3 in Foreground, 1 in Background

Platforms
Platform	Usable length	Platform height	Current use
1	127.8/47.2 m	76/22 cm	Services towards Wiesloch-Walldorf/Bruchsal/Karlsruhe
2	183.4/29.1/27.4 m	76/38/28 cm	Services towards Heidelberg/Mannheim/Ludwigshafen/Germersheim
3	183.4/29.1/27.4 m	76/38/28 cm	Siding

== Transport services ==
=== Rail ===
The station is served hourly by services on S-Bahn lines S3 (Germersheim–Karlsruhe Hbf) and S4 (Germersheim–Bruchsal), resulting in a service every half-hour between Germersheim and Bruchsal. Furthermore, individual Regionalbahn services from Heidelberg Hbf to Wiesloch-Walldorf stop in Kirchheim/Rohrbach in the peak hour. In the evening, the Stuttgart–Heidelberg Regional-Express service stops at the station. During the International German Gymnastics Festival (Internationales Deutsches Turnfest) in 2013, which was held between 18 and 26 May 2013, one of two so-called Turnfestzügen (Gymnastics Festival trains) ran from here to Speyer.

Rail services in 2021 timetable
Train type	Route	Frequency
S3	Germersheim – Speyer – Schifferstadt – Ludwigshafen – Mannheim – Heidelberg Hbf – Heidelberg-Kirchheim/Rohrbach – Wiesloch-Walldorf – Bruchsal – Karlsruhe	30/60
S4	Germersheim – Speyer – Schifferstadt – Ludwigshafen (Rhein) – Mannheim – Heidelberg Hbf – Heidelberg-Kirchheim/Rohrbach – Wiesloch-Walldorf – Bruchsal	60 (peaks)
RB 68	Frankfurt – Darmstadt – Heidelberg Hbf – Heidelberg-Kirchheim/Rohrbach – Wiesloch-Walldorf	60 (weekdays)

=== Buses ===
Bus route 33 stops on the bridge that spans the station. In addition, bus route 28 stops on the Rohrbach side of the station.
