= DeinBus.de =

- Company type: Private
- Industry: Transport, Travel, Travel technology
- Founded: 2009
- Founders: Alexander Kuhr, Christian Janisch, Ingo Mayr-Knoch
- Headquarters: Offenbach am Main, Germany
- Services: Intercity bus service
- Website: www.deinbus.de

DeinBus.de (meaning in English YourBus) is a young mobility German provider and offers daily intercity bus service in center Europe. It was launched in 2009. DeinBus.de was sued by Deutsche Bahn and won in court which is deemed responsible for the deregulation of the German mobility market in 2013.
