= Aglasterhausen =

- Municipality
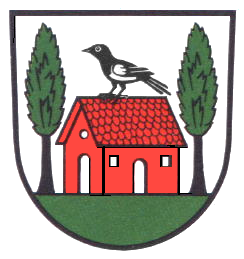
- Coat of arms

- Location of Aglasterhausen within Neckar-Odenwald-Kreis district
- Interactive map of Aglasterhausen
- Location within Germany Location within Baden-Württemberg
- Coordinates: 49°21′14″N 8°59′25″E
- Country: Germany
- State: Baden-Württemberg
- Admin. region: Karlsruhe
- District: Neckar-Odenwald-Kreis
- Subdivisions: 4

Government
  - Mayor (2021–29): Stefan Josef Kron (Ind.)

Area
  - Total: 22.85 km^{2} (8.82 sq mi)
- Elevation: 197 m (646 ft)

Population (2025-12-31)
  - Total: 4,840
  - Density: 212/km^{2} (549/sq mi)
- Time zone: UTC+01:00 (CET)
  - Summer (DST): UTC+02:00 (CEST)
- Postal codes: 74856, 74858
- Dialling codes: 06262
- Vehicle registration: MOS, BCH
- Website: www.aglasterhausen.de

Aglasterhausen is a municipality in the district of Neckar-Odenwald-Kreis, in Baden-Württemberg, Germany.

== History ==
Aglasterhausen is first mentioned in the records of the Bishop of Worms in 1143. It had its own nobility as early as the middle of the 12th century.

In 1416, the town was ceded to the Electorate of the Palatinate, but with the death of Friedrich von Hirschhorn in 1632, that line ended, and the ownership reverted to the bishopric of Worms. This continued until 1803, when Aglasterhausen was given to Baden.

== Mayors ==
- 1981–2013: Erich Dambach
- 2013–2021: Sabine Schweiger
- since 2021: Stefan Josef Kron

== Personalities ==
- Albert Schreiner (1892-1979), Communist politician and historian
- Helmut Degen (1911-1995), composer
- Hans Kissel (1897-1975), major-general
