= Staudernheim station =

Railway station in Staudernheim, Germany

Staudernheim
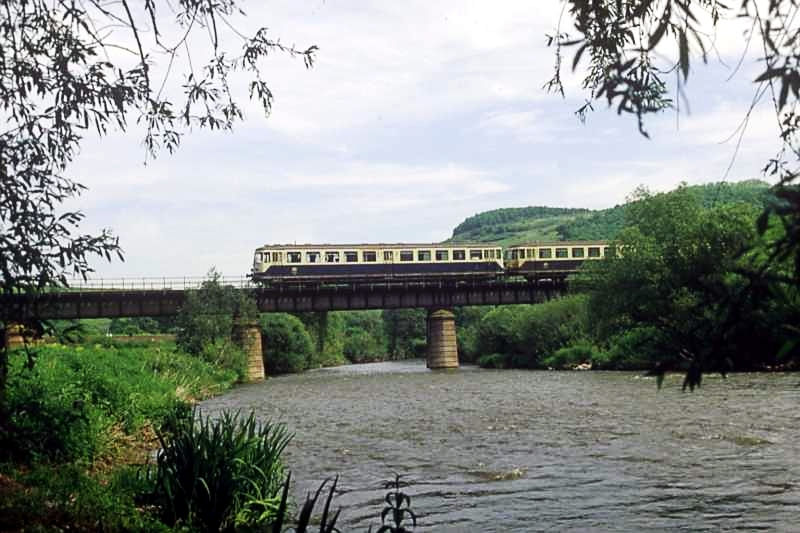
- Accumulator cars crossing the Nahe on the Glan Valley Railway east of the station in 1986

General information
- Location: Bahnhofstr. 1, Staudernheim, Rhineland-Palatinate; Germany
- Coordinates: 49°46′49″N 7°41′35″E
- Lines: Bingen–Saarbrücken (35.3 km; 21.9 mi); Odernheim–Staudernheim (3.6 km; 2.2 mi) (draisine rides)
- Platforms: 3

Construction
- Accessible: Yes

Other information
- Station code: 5973
- DS100 code: SSTH
- IBNR: 8005678
- Category: 5
- Fare zone: RNN: 420; : 6940 (RNN transitional tariff)
- Website: www.bahnhof.de

History
- Opened: 15 December 1859

Services
Preceding station	Vlexx	Following station
Bad Sobernheim towards Saarbrücken Hbf	RE 3	Bad Münster am Stein towards Frankfurt (Main) Hbf
Bad Sobernheim towards Neubrücke (Nahe)	RB 33	Norheim towards Wiesbaden Hbf
Location

Staudernheim station is a through station, located 35.3 km (21.9 mi) from Bingen on the Nahe Valley Railway (Bingen–Saarbrücken), in Staudernheim in the district of Bad Kreuznach in the German state of Rhineland-Palatinate. It was opened with this line on 15 December 1859 and was the first and only station in the Meisenheim exclave of the Landgraviate of Hesse-Homburg, which was absorbed by Prussia in 1866. The station is located in the network area of the Rhein-Nahe-Nahverkehrsverbund (Rhine-Nahe Transport Association, RNN) and it is in fare zone 420. Its address is Bahnhofstraße 1.

== Location ==
The station is not far from the left bank of the Nahe. Residential areas extend to its north and south. It has barrier-free access.

The Nahe Valley Railway runs through the municipality in an east-west direction approximately parallel to the Nahe river on its north side. The Glan Valley Railway, which has been disused since 1996, comes from the south at first in a wide arc around the Disibodenberg monastery ruin and then connects with the Nahe line just outside the station.

== History ==
In the treaty of 7 June 1856 between the Kingdom of Prussia and the Landgraviate of Hesse-Homburg that authorised the construction of the Nahe Valley Railway, it was agreed in Article 5 to build a bridge over the Nahe in the territory of the landgraviate as close as practicable to Staudernheim and to build a station where the line crossed the highway there. It was decided that all ordinary trains would stop there, while express trains would stop only at the neighbouring Sobernheim station in Prussia. After the Bingerbrück–Kreuznach section was opened in 1858, the section between Kreuznach and Oberstein was opened on 15 December 1859, connecting Staudernheim to the rail network. The line was duplicated in 1884.

After 20 years of discussions, Bavaria and Prussia signed a treaty on 28 October 1891 that authorised the construction of the Glan Valley Railway. The Lauterecken–Odernheim section was opened in October 1896. Closing the gap to Staudernhiem was delayed because local landowners attempted to obtain high prices for the sale of their land for the railway. Accordingly, the missing section was opened in December 1896. The line between Kaiserslautern and Staudernheim was opened over its whole length on 1 July 1897.

In the course of the opening of the line, the station underwent a major expansion. In this context, it received, among other things, an additional eight sets of points, three terminal tracks with a total length of 1,500 m (4,900 ft), a turntable with a diameter of 16.07 m (52.7 ft), 297 m-long (974 ft) sidings, a head loading ramp and a side loading ramp, which was about 200 m (660 ft) long. In the eastern part of the station precinct, there was also a watering point for the steam locomotives of the Palatinate Railway.

While in the meantime political circumstances had changed, the construction of a strategic railway from Homburg to Bad Münster was still supported. The Odernheim–Bad Münster am Stein section was finally opened in 1904, which made the Odernheim–Staudernhein section into a feeder service. While the Glan Valley Railway was duplicated from Homburg to Bad Munster, the connecting line from Stdaudernheim remained as a single track.

As part of the modernisation of the Nahe Valley Railway, the mechanical signalling systems at the station were decommissioned around 1980. Passenger services on the Glan Valley Railway were discontinued on the Homburg–Glan-Munchweiler section in 1981, on the Altenglan–Lauterecken-Grumbach section in 1985 and on the Lauterecken-Grumbach–Staudernheim section on 30 May 1986. The Lauterecken-Grumbach–Staudernheim section was officially closed on 1 July 1996.

=== Current development (since 1996) ===
Since 2000, there have been draisine operations on the Glan Valley Railway from Altenglan to its junction with the Nahe Valley Railway east of the station. There are plans to extend this service to the station.

Plans to modernise the station fundamentally were finalised in 2008. This included the provision of disabled access in the form of raising the height of the platforms to 55 cm (22 in), the installation of two lifts, a ramp for wheelchairs and the renewal of the stairs including the adaptation of the stairs to the new platform height. Construction began in 2010 and the cost of the modernisation totalled €2.5 million. The work was completed in June 2012 and the official opening of the modernised station subsequently took place with the participation of several state and local politicians.

== Rail services ==
With the completion of the Nahe Valley Railway in 1860 a total of four pairs of train services ran between Saarbrücken and Bingerbrück. Due to its insignificance, express trains stopped only in neighbouring Sobernheim.

With the completion of the lower Glan Valley Railway in 1897, through services ran from Staudernheim trains to Kaiserslautern and vice versa on the Lauterbrunnen Valley Railway, which was opened in 1883, leading to an increase in traffic at the station. After the Glan Valley Railway was opened in 1904 for its full length between Homburg and Bad Münster, these services were cancelled. Subsequently, the line to Odernheim was operated by steam railcars. Through connections via Odernheim were only restored later. After the closure of the Glan Valley Railway between Odernheim and Bad Münster in 1961, all services on the line ran through Staudernheim; until recently many of them continued to Sobernheim. Until the early 1990s Staudernhiem was a stop for RegionalSchnellBahn (regional rapid transit, a precursor of Regional-Express) services, before this type of service was abandoned.

Since the Nahe Valley Railway between Saarbrücken and Türkismühle has been electrified since 1969, Regionalbahn (RB) services run to the west, with a few exceptions only as far as Türkismühle; electrification of the remaining Nahe Valley Railway has not proceeded because of the complicated topography of the route.

Every day there are hourly services by Regionalbahn services on line RB 33. The Rhein-Nahe-Express stops every two hours at Staudernheim station.

Line	Route	Frequency
RE 3	Rhein-Nahe-Express; Saarbrücken Hbf – Neunkirchen (Saar) Hbf – Ottweiler (Saar) – Türkismühle – Idar-Oberstein – Staudernheim – Bad Kreuznach - Mainz Hbf	Every 2 hours
RB 33	Nahetalbahn; Idar-Oberstein – Staudernheim – Bad Kreuznach - Mainz Hbf	Hourly
