= Bad Münster am Stein station =

Railway station in Bad Kreuznach, Germany

Bad Münster am Stein
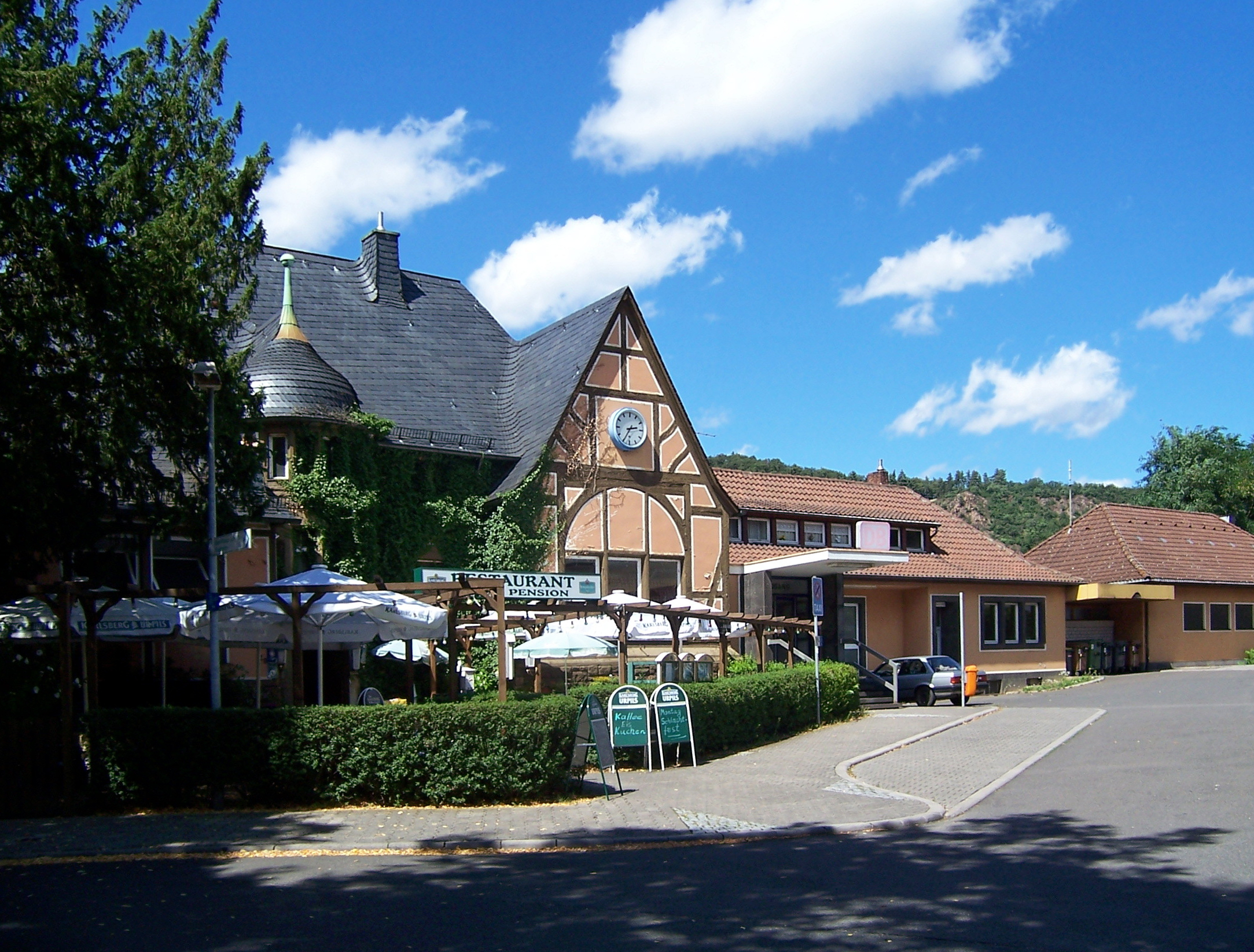
- Entrance building (street side)

General information
- Location: Berliner Str. 20, Bad Münster am Stein-Ebernburg, Bad Kreuznach, Rhineland-Palatinate; Germany
- Coordinates: 49°48′48″N 7°50′49″E
- Lines: Nahe Valley Railway (KBS 672/680); Alsenz Valley Railway (KBS 672); Glan Valley Railway (ex KBS 641)
- Platforms: 4

Construction
- Accessible: N0
- Architectural style: Jugendstil

Other information
- Station code: 307
- DS100 code: SBMS
- IBNR: 8000726
- Category: 4
- Fare zone: RNN: 401; : 6920 (RNN transitional tariff)
- Website: www.bahnhof.de

History
- Opened: 15 December 1859

Services
Preceding station	Vlexx	Following station
Staudernheim towards Saarbrücken Hbf	RE 3	Bad Kreuznach towards Frankfurt (Main) Hbf
Bad Kreuznach towards Koblenz Hbf	RE 17	Rockenhausen towards Kaiserslautern Hbf
Norheim towards Neubrücke (Nahe)	RB 33	Bad Kreuznach towards Wiesbaden Hbf
Preceding station	DB Regio Mitte	Following station
Altenbamberg towards Kaiserslautern Hbf	RB 65	Bad Kreuznach towards Bingen Hbf
Location

Bad Münster am Stein station is a station at a railway junction in Bad Münster am Stein-Ebernburg, a district of Bad Kreuznach in the German state of Rhineland-Palatinate. The station building, dating from about 1910, is protected as a monument. It is classified by Deutsche Bahn as a category 4 station. The station is located in the network of the Rhein-Nahe-Nahverkehrsverbund (Rhine-Nahe local transport association, RNN) and belongs to fare zone 401. Its address is: Berliner Straße 20.

The station, opened in 1859, was initially a through station on the Nahe Valley Railway (Nahetalbahn), which was built by the Rhine-Nahe Railway Company (Rhein-Nahe-Bahn). In 1871, the Alsenz Valley Railway (Alsenztalbahn) was opened from Hochspeyer with its northern terminus in the town then called just Münster. From 1904 to 1961, it was also the north-eastern terminus of the Glan Valley Railway (Glantalbahn), a strategic railway running to Homburg.

== Location ==
=== Local situation ===
The station is located in the centre of the district of Bad Münster am Stein. It has a telephone, parking and a taxi rank.

=== Railway lines ===
The Nahe Valley Railway comes from the north-east and shortly before reaching the station, it crosses the Nahe river on a bridge. It then turns to the west to run on the left (western) bank of the Nahe. The Alsenz Valley Railway comes from the south-southwest and also bridges the Nahe, a few hundred metres down river from the Nahe Valley Railway. The now closed Glan Valley Railway ran on the right bank of the Nahe, before crossing the river shortly before the Alsenz Valley Railway and connecting with the Nahe Valley Railway.

== History ==
=== Connection to the railway network by the Rhine-Nahe Railway ===
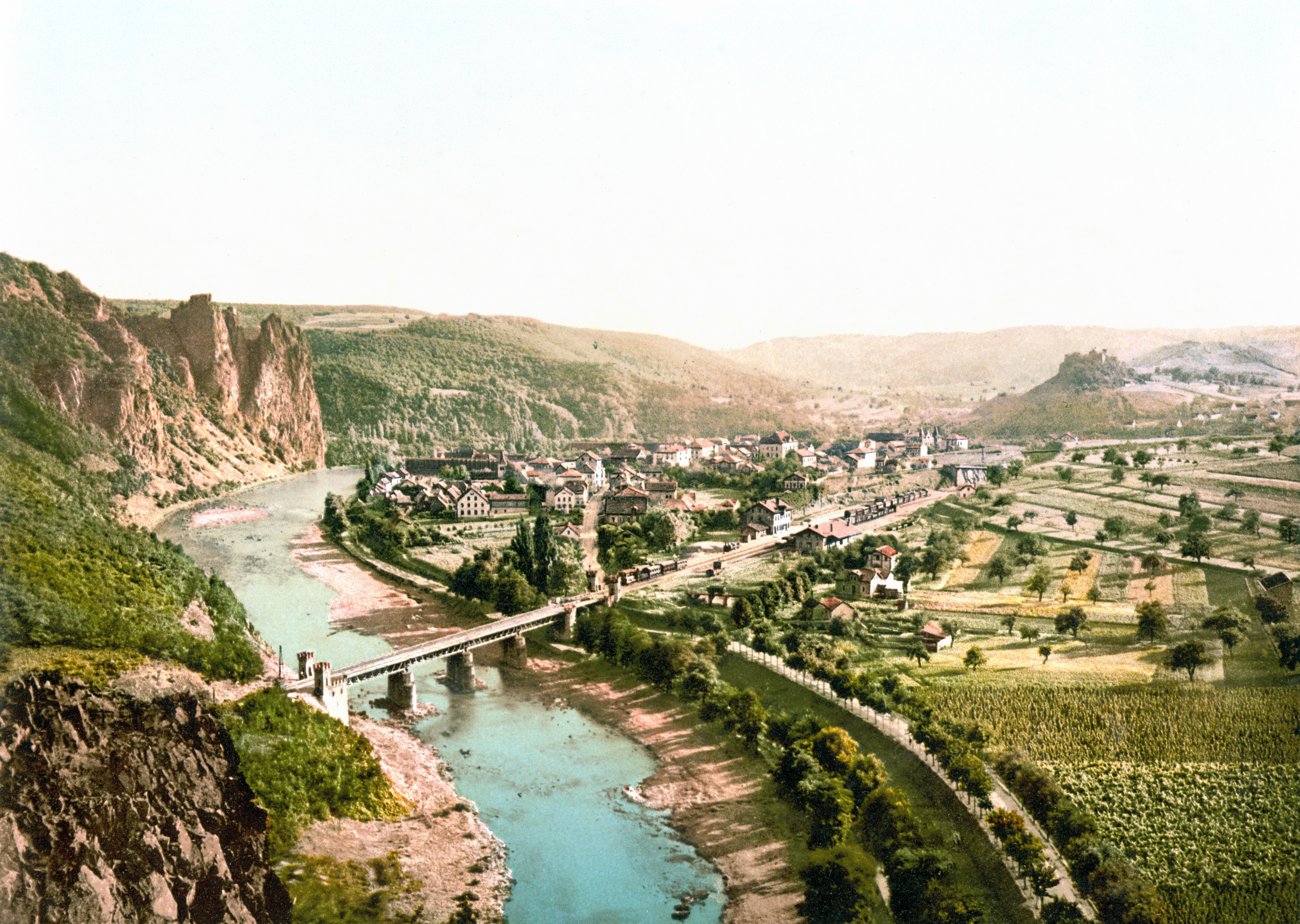
Panorama of Münster am Stein with the first station building of 1859 (centre) in ca. 1900

Although initial efforts to create a railway along the Nahe go back to 1839, disputes between Prussia and the Grand Duchy of Oldenburg over the route, however, delayed its realisation. While Prussia preferred the line run directly along the Nahe, Oldenburg promoted a line through Birkenfeld, which is in a side valley, which was also the capital of its exclave, the Birkenfeld Principality (Fürstentum Birkenfeld). In 1856, the then Bavarian Palatinate proposed that the planned railway leave the Nahe Valley at Boos and run to Altenglan along the Glan via Kusel and from there to St. Wendel or alternatively along the Oster valley to Neunkirchen. The basis of this third variant was that it would be shorter and cheaper than a line along the length of the Nahe. For tactical reasons, Prussia initially expressed interest in these plans, which led to Oldenburg giving way and accepting the route along the Nahe within its territory.

After the Bingerbrück–Kreuznach section was ready for use in 1858, it was opened between Kreuznach and Oberstein on 15 December 1859, which gave Münster access to the railway network.

=== Origin of the Alsenz Valley Railway and the subsequent period ===
From 1859, a continuous north–south main line was built from the Rhineland via Rhenish Hesse to Ludwigshafen in the form of the Left Rhine railway (Linke Rheinstrecke, Cologne–Mainz) and the Mainz–Ludwigshafen railway. However, the route through Mainz was indirect, so plans were made for a shorter route, which used the Nahe Valley Railway from Bingerbrück to Münster and then runs along the Alsenz in the area of the Donnersberg through Enkenbach and continues towards Neustadt. These plans were in competition with efforts to promote a railway from Stadernheim to Kaiserslautern along the Glan and Lauter to Kaiserslautern. The planned route in the Alsenz valley, which was to run immediately south of Münster, was finally supported by Bavaria.

In order to cater to the interests of the city of Kaiserslautern, a connecting curve to Hochspeyer was built south of Fischbach to enable rail operations. The Hochspeyer–Winnweiler section was opened on 29 October 1870. The Winnweiler–Münster section followed on 16 May 1871. With the opening of this line, which was conceived as part of a north–south trunk line, the through station became a junction station. The duplication of the Rhine-Nahe Railway was completed in 1884.

=== Strategic railway ===
A strategic railway was established in the Rhine-Nahe region around 1900. As part of this, the Gau Algesheim–Bad Kreuznach railway and the railway line between Bad Kreuznach and Münster was upgraded to four tracks in 1902.

The connection of the Glan Valley Railway followed in 1904. The Bad Münster am Stein station had to be fundamentally transformed in a confined space. After Münster had received the title Bad, the station was renamed Bad Münster am Stein. Its growing traffic and the town's increasing importance as a spa town led around 1910 to the reorganisation of the station facilities and to the construction of a stately entrance building. During the Second World War, there were several air raids on Bad Münster in 1944 due to its importance as a strategic railway hub. The entrance building was destroyed.

In 1926 and 1927, the Calais-Wiesbaden-Express stopped in Bad Münster. It ran over the Nahe Valley Railway from Calais and across the Glan Valley Railway in the other direction.

=== Developments since the post-war period ===
After the Second World War, the entrance building was rebuilt in a largely identical form. Subsequently, the four-track Bad Kreuznach–Bad Münster section was partially dismantled as there was no longer any requirement for more than two tracks.

At the same time, however, the viability of the Glan Valley Railway, which was built primarily for military reasons, was questioned. Above all, the Odernheim–Bad Münster section, which ran parallel with the Nahe Valley Railway, had very little traffic; The last through train to Homburg ran in 1946. The Odernheim–Bad Münster section was therefore closed and dismantled up to 29 September 1961. From then on, all trains of the Glan Valley Railway had to run east to Staudernheim and reverse there, including the express trains of the Zweibrücken–Mainz route between 1965 and 1979 (known popularly as the Munzinger-Express, after Oskar Munzinger, who as mayor of Zweibrücken and a member of the state diet in Mainz had campaigned for its establishment).

After the abandonment of Ebernburg station in the 1970s, Bad Münster am Stein station was the only one in the municipality of Bad Münster am Stein-Ebernburg, which was created in 1969 as part of the Rhineland-Palatinate administrative reform and was itself incorporated into Bad Kreuznach in 2014.

During the modernisation of the railway line, the mechanical signalling systems were taken out of operation at the station around 1980.

== Infrastructure ==
=== Entrance building ===
The station building dating from around 1910 is a representative one-story Art Nouveau building, which is covered by a large hipped roof and thus reflects the architecture of the spa and bath house of 1911. It is partly built in timber framing. Nearby to its northwest there is also a single-storey outbuilding with a shallow hipped roof.

=== Signal box ===
The station also had three signal boxes. Signal box I (Stellwerk I) was in the northern part of the station, signal box II was in the middle of the platform. Signal box III was in the southern part of the station. Since the 1980s, however, they have been out of operation.

=== Platforms ===
Platforms
Platform	Usable length	Platform height	Current use
1	258 m	20 cm	towards Bingen
2	258 m	20 cm	towards Mainz/Frankfurt
3	290 m	20 cm	towards Kaiserslautern
4	290 m	20 cm	towards Saarbrücken

== Operations ==
=== Passenger services ===
With the opening of the Nahe Valley Railway in 1860, a total of four train pairs operated between Saarbrücken and Bingerbrück. None run on the whole route now. The trains to and from Saarbrücken run over the Gau Algesheim–Bad Kreuznach railway to Mainz hourly, continuing every two hours to Frankfurt am Main. The service that run over the Nahe Valley Railway from Bingen continue over the Alsenz Valley Railway and the Mannheim–Saarbrücken railway or the Kaiserslautern–Enkenbach railway to Kaiserslautern; until the 2000s, they continued from Kaiserslautern over the Biebermühl Railway to Pirmasens.

After the railway line between Saarbrücken and Türkismühle was electrified in 1969, the Regionalbahn (RB) services ran to the west, with only a few exceptions, to Türkismühle until 2014. Electrification of the rest of the route was not considered to be financially justified because of the difficult topography of the line, particularly the need to enlarge tunnels. With the electrification of the line between Türkismühle and Neubrücke in 2014 and the reactivation of the Heimbach (Nahe)–Baumholder railway with services between Baumholder and Idar-Oberstein via Neubrücke, the Regionalbahn services now stop at Idar-Oberstein.

Bad Münster am Stein station is served by the following regional rail services:

Line	Route	Frequency
RE 3	Rhein-Nahe-Express; Saarbrücken – Neunkirchen – Ottweiler – Türkismühle – Idar-Oberstein – Bad Münster – Bad Kreuznach – Mainz (– Frankfurt)	Hourly (to Mainz), every 2 hours (to Frankfurt)
RE 17	Kaiserslautern – Winnweiler – Rockenhausen – Bad Münster – Kreuznach – Bingen – Koblenz	Every 2 hours
RB 33	Nahetalbahn; Idar-Oberstein – Bad Münster – Bad Kreuznach – Mainz	Hourly
RB 65	Alsenztalbahn; Kaiserslautern – Winnweiler – Rockenhausen – Bad Münster – Bad Kreuznach – Bingen	Hourly

=== Freight traffic ===
Due to its topography, the Nahe Valley Railway did not have any importance for long-distance freight traffic. On the Glan Valley Railway, on the other hand, coal trains from today's Saarland and general freight trains took advantage of its larger loading gauge in the 1940s and 1950s.

Freight operations were discontinued at Bad Münster at the end of the 1980s. After the closing of the Odernheim–Bad Münster section of the Glan Valley Railway in 1961, the connecting track from the Kraftwerks Niederhausen (Niederhausen power station) was still served for a few decades and was only dismantled in 1992. This required the freight trains to reverse in Staudernheim.
