= Friedrichsthal (Saar) station =

Railway station in Friedrichsthal, Germany

Friedrichsthal (Saar)
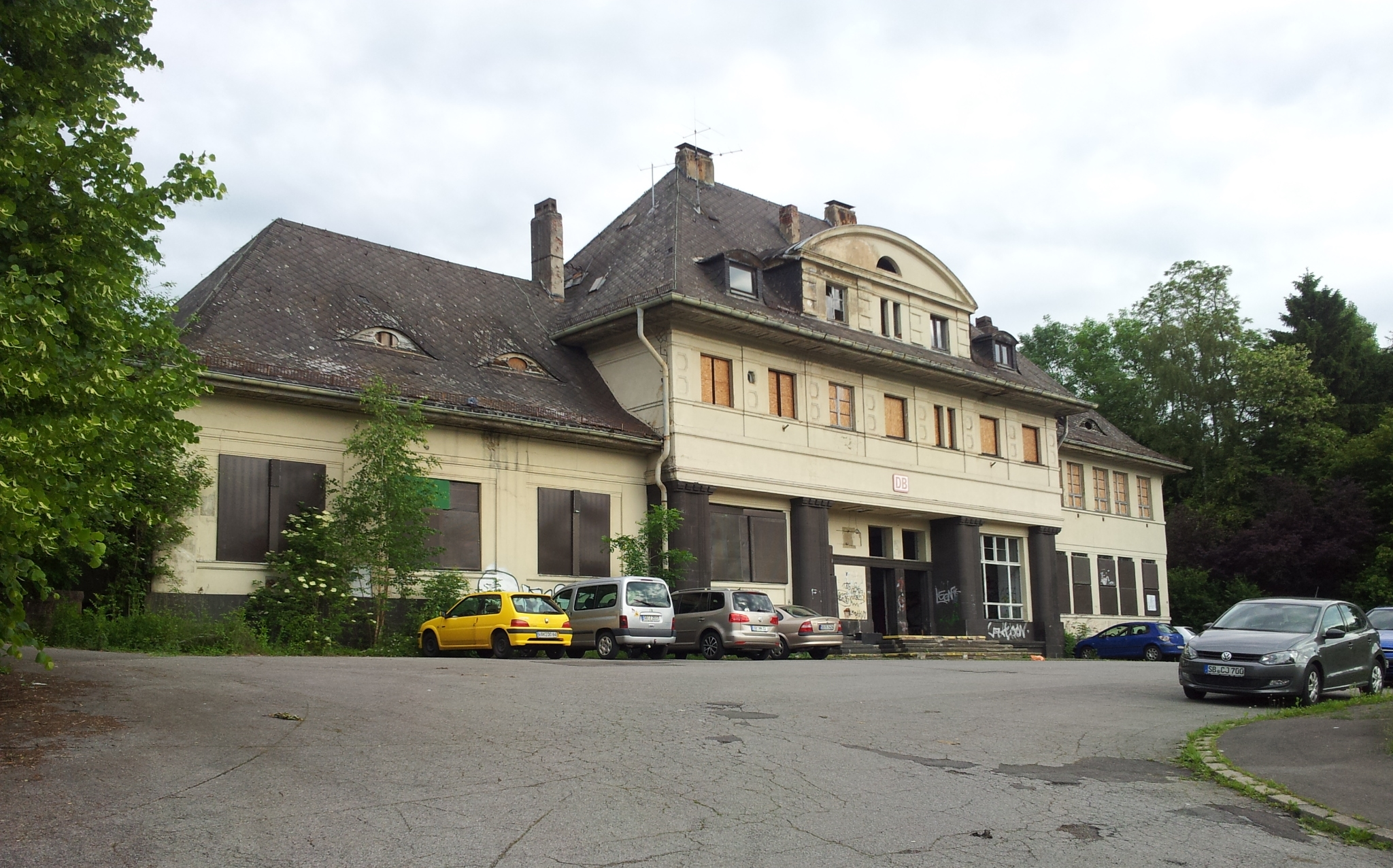
- View of the entrance building in its current state

General information
- Location: Am Bahnhof 3, Friedrichsthal, Saarland; Germany
- Coordinates: 49°19′12″N 7°05′20″E
- Line: Nahe Valley Railway (km 133.1)
- Platforms: 2

Construction
- Accessible: No

Other information
- Station code: 1956
- DS100 code: SFI
- IBNR: 839110
- Category: 6
- Fare zone: SaarVV: 101
- Website: www.bahnhof.de

History
- Opened: 1852

Services
Preceding station	Vlexx	Following station
Sulzbach (Saar) Altenwald towards Saarbrücken Hbf	RB 73	Friedrichsthal (Saar) Mitte towards Neubrücke (Nahe)
Location

Friedrichsthal (Saar) station is a station in the town of Friedrichsthal in the German state of Saarland. It is on the Nahe Valley Railway (Nahetalbahn) between Saarbrücken and Türkismühle.

== History ==
The station is located on the Saarbrücken−Neunkirchen railway, an important route in the 19th and early 20th century for the transport of coal from the mines to the coal port of Saarbrücken and to southern Germany and France. The first Friedrichsthal station was opened in 1852 and was located at the extreme south-west of the village. The industrial centre of Friedrichsthal was located in this area. In the second half of the 19th century, the station made the establishments of glass works in Friedrichsthal possible.

The first station was demolished in 1910 to allow the line to be upgraded and today's building was built a few metres further west. The cost of the renewal of the station (access to the island platform without having to use a pedestrian crossing over the tracks and the construction of the new entrance building) was estimated in 1909 to total 253,000 marks.

== Architecture and usage ==
The entrance building consists of a main building and two lower wings. It has a high, slate-covered hip roof, which is equipped with eyebrow dormers and gables. A wall dormer with wide segment gables emphasises the central axis of the building. The façade is divided by cornices and pilasters, which are constructed on the ground floor of the central section as a wider pillar. The station has an island platform and thus two platform faces. Barrier-free access to the platforms is not possible because there are only stairs. The station building is on a hillside with its ground floor level well below the tracks. The entire building is now protected as a monument. Until the 1980s, the station was busy. There was a station restaurant and a Deutsche Bundesbahn ticket counter. After the railway closed the ticket office in the course of restructuring measures in the 1990s and the premises had become unprofitable, the station was partially rented as a residential building. Nowadays, the station building is empty. It serves only as a passage to the tracks and has become increasingly decayed.

== Operations ==
Friedrichsthal station is served only by Regionalbahn services on line RB 73, running every 30 minutes from Saarbrücken to St. Wendel (every 60 minutes to Neubrücke (Nahe)).

Line	Route	Interval
RB 73	(Neubrücke (Nahe) – Türkismühle –) St. Wendel – Neunkirchen (Saar) Hbf – Friedrichsthal (Saar) – Saarbrücken Hbf	30 mins
