= St. Wendel station =

Railway station in Sankt Wendel, Germany

St Wendel
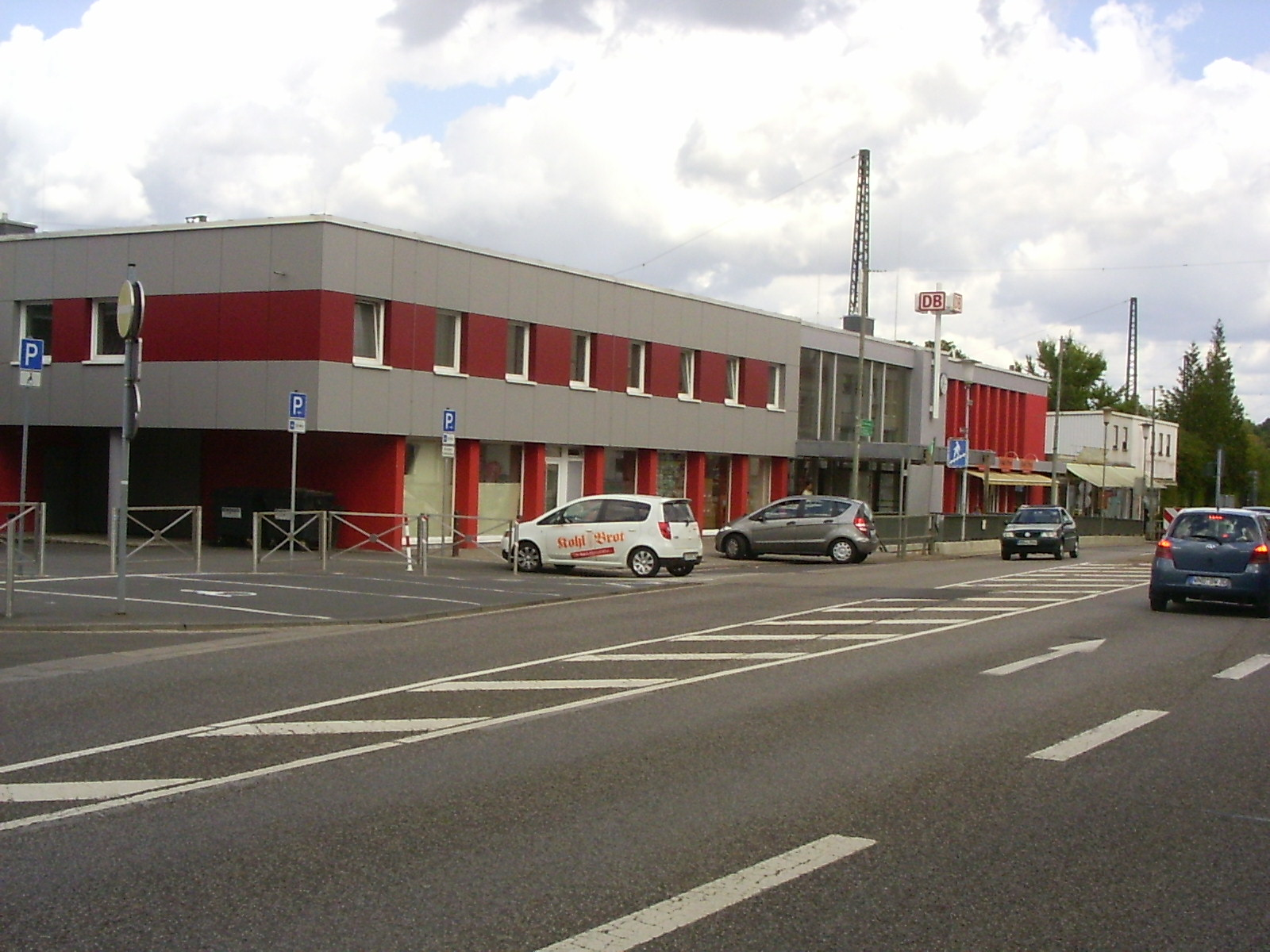
- Entrance building

General information
- Location: Mommstr. 2, St. Wendel, Saarland; Germany
- Coordinates: 49°28′01″N 7°09′56″E
- Lines: Bingen (Rhein)–Saarbrücken (km 106.3); St. Wendel–Tholey (km 0.0) (closed)
- Platforms: 4

Construction
- Accessible: Yes

Other information
- Station code: 5948
- DS100 code: SSWD
- IBNR: 8005659
- Category: 4
- Fare zone: SaarVV: 671
- Website: www.bahnhof.de

History
- Opened: 26 May 1860

Services
Preceding station	Vlexx	Following station
Ottweiler (Saar) towards Saarbrücken Hbf	RE 3	Türkismühle towards Frankfurt (Main) Hbf
Oberlinxweiler towards Saarbrücken Hbf	RB 73	Baltersweiler towards Neubrücke (Nahe)
Location

St. Wendel station is the most important station in the town of St. Wendel in the German state of Saarland. The station is located at line-kilometer 106.3 of the Nahe Valley Railway (Nahetalbahn) and was the beginning of the now dismantled St. Wendel–Tholey railway. It was opened during the extension of the Nahe Valley Railway from Idar-Oberstein via Türkismühle to Neunkirchen (Saar) on 26 May 1860.

== Location ==
The station is located in the centre of the town of St. Wendel. A large bus station with 16 bus platforms is located in front of the station building from which city buses and regional buses run to the surrounding towns and municipalities.

== History ==
St. Wendel station was opened with the Idar-Oberstein–Türkismühle–St. Wendel–Neunkirchen (Saar) section of the Nahe Valley Railway from Bingen am Rhein to Saarbrücken on 26 May 1860.

A single-track local railway was opened from St. Wendel station to Tholey on 3 August 1915, but its planned continuation to Lebach was not built. Passenger services were stopped on this route in 1984. The section from Oberthal to Tholey was closed first and the remainder of the line, which was served by freight traffic until 1995, was closed in 1996. Meanwhile, the entire line from St. Wendel to Tholey has been converted to an asphalt long-distance cycling route (Wendelinus–Radweg).

The Reichsbahn district office was moved from Türkismühle to St. Wendel in 1937.

The line from Türkismühle to St. Wendel has been electrified since 1969.

== Operations ==
All trains on the Nahe Valley Railway now (2017) stop at St. Wendel. The station is a stop of an hourly Regional-Express line RE 3 from Frankfurt (Main) Hauptbahnhof or Mainz Hauptbahnhof to Saarbrücken Hauptbahnhof and an hourly Regionalbahn service from Neubrücke via Türkismühle, St. Wendel and Neunkirchen to Saarbrücken (RB 73) and an hourly Regionalbahn service from St. Wendel via Neunkirchen to Saarbrücken (also RB 73).

Line	Route	Interval
RE 3	(Frankfurt (Main) Hbf –) Mainz Hbf – Bad Kreuznach – Idar-Oberstein – Türkismühle – St. Wendel – Neunkirchen (Saar) Hbf – Saarbrücken Hbf	60 to Mainz and 120 mins to Frankfurt
RB 73	(Neubrücke (Nahe) – Türkismühle –) St. Wendel – Neunkirchen (Saar) Hbf – Saarbrücken Hbf	30 mins
