= Mainz-Marienborn station =

Railway station in Mainz, Germany

Mainz-Marienborn
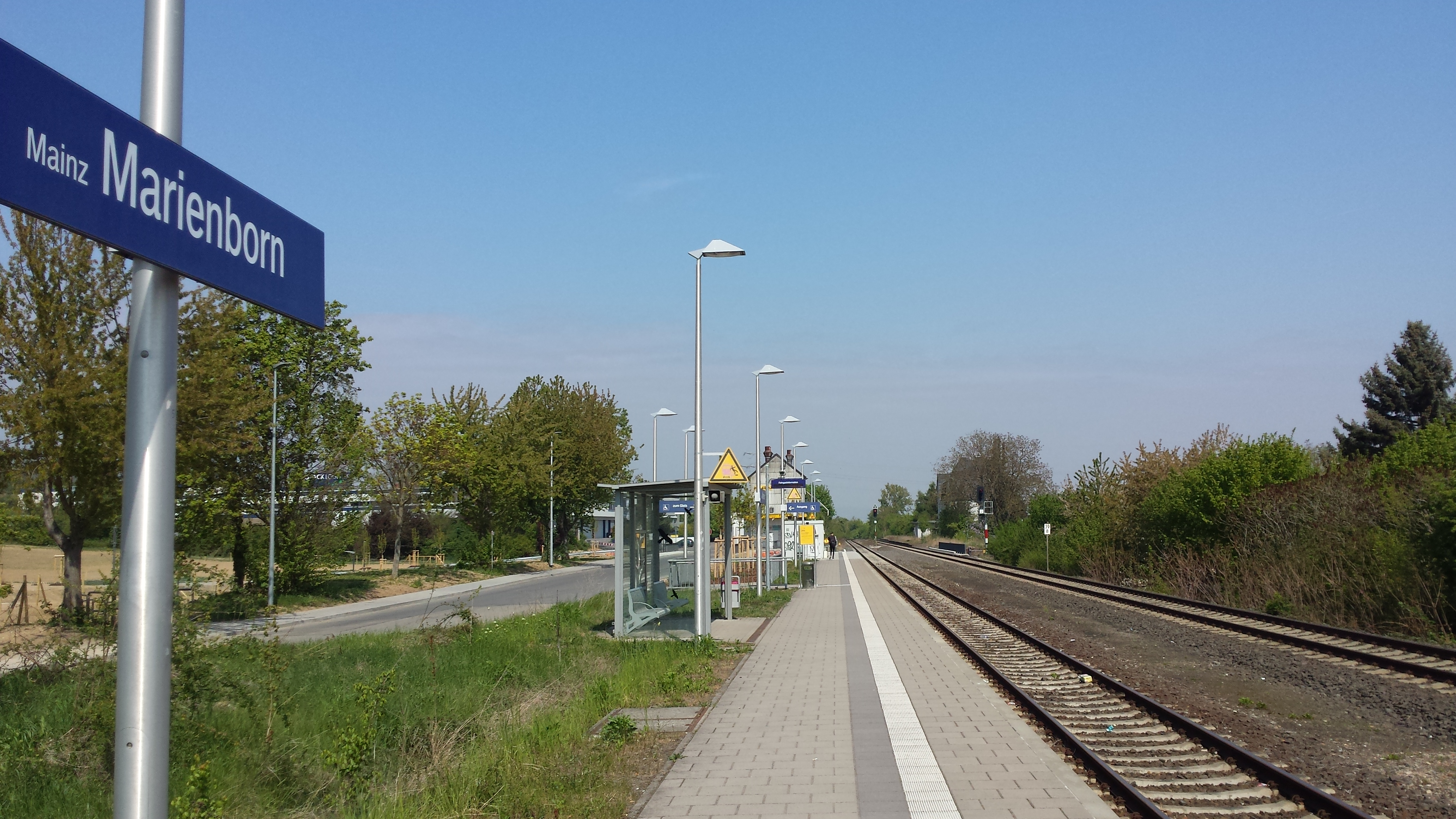
- 2017

General information
- Location: Marienborner Bergweg/Achardstraße; 55127 Mainz-Marienborn; Rhineland-Palatinate; Germany
- Coordinates: 49.9605°N 8.2228°E
- Elevation: 163 m (535 ft)
- System: Bf
- Owner: Deutsche Bahn
- Operator: DB Station&Service
- Lines: Alzey–Mainz railway (KBS 661)
- Platforms: 1 side platform
- Tracks: 2
- Train operators: vlexx
- Connections: 51 53; 70

Construction
- Parking: yes
- Cycle facilities: no
- Accessible: yes

Other information
- Station code: 3906
- DS100 code: FMMB
- IBNR: 8003820
- Category: 6
- Fare zone: : 6511; RNN: 300 (RMV transitional tariff)
- Website: www.bahnhof.de

Services
Preceding station	Vlexx	Following station
Klein Winternheim-Ober Olm towards Kirchheimbolanden	RB 31	Mainz-Gonsenheim towards Mainz Hbf
Location
- Location within Rhineland-Palatinate Location within Germany Location within Europe

Mainz-Marienborn station (German: Bahnhof Mainz-Marienborn) is a railway station in the municipality of Mainz, Rhineland-Palatinate, Germany.

== Notable places nearby ==
- ZDF-Sendezentrum
