= Ottweiler (Saar) station =

Railway station in Ottweiler, Germany

Ottweiler (Saar)
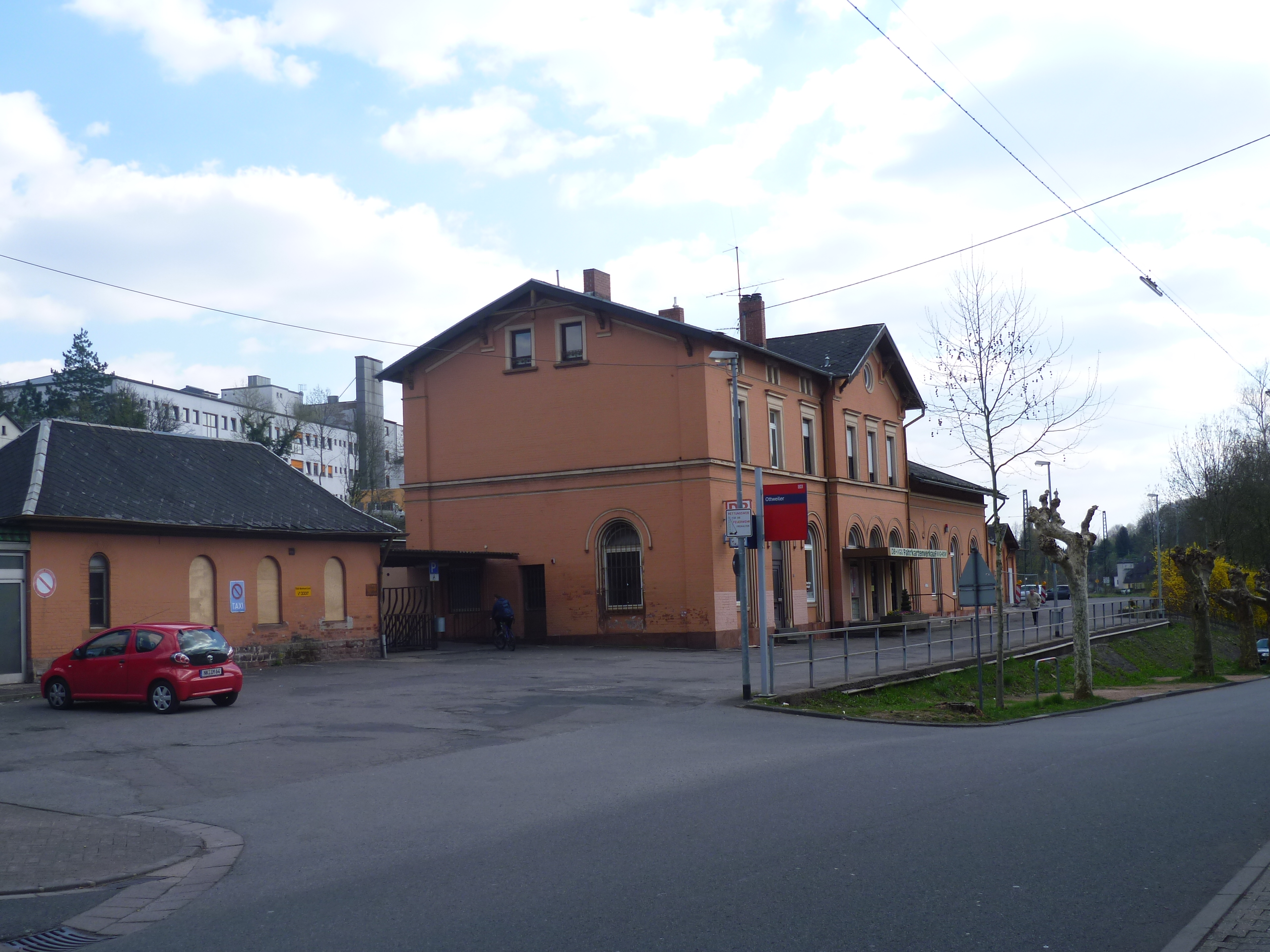

General information
- Location: Bahnhofstr. 2, Ottweiler, Saarland; Germany
- Coordinates: 49°24′09″N 7°09′58″E
- Lines: Nahe Valley Railway (114,8 km); Oster Valley Railway (0,0 km)
- Platforms: 2 (previously 3) (and 1 special platform)

Construction
- Accessible: Platform 1 only

Other information
- Station code: 4837
- DS100 code: SOTW
- IBNR: 8000875
- Category: 5
- Fare zone: SaarVV: 351
- Website: www.bahnhof.de

History
- Opened: About 1860

Passengers
- ca. 1300

Services
Preceding station	Vlexx	Following station
Neunkirchen Hbf towards Saarbrücken Hbf	RE 3	St. Wendel towards Frankfurt (Main) Hbf
Wiebelskirchen towards Saarbrücken Hbf	RB 73	Niederlinxweiler towards Neubrücke (Nahe)
Location

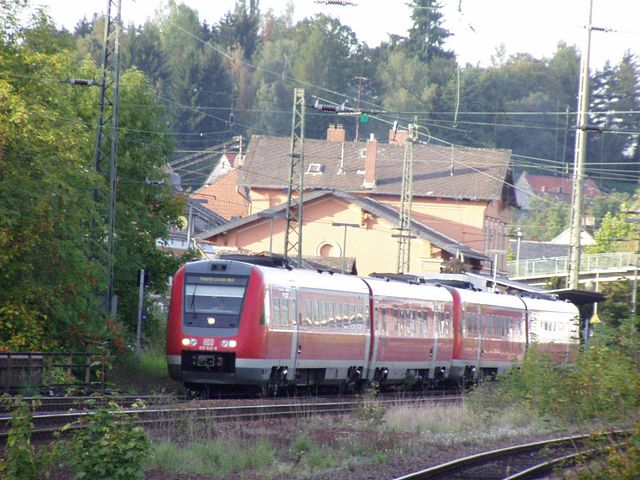
Regional-Express in Ottweiler station

Ottweiler (Saar) station is centrally located in the town of Ottweiler in the German state of the Saarland on the Nahe Valley Railway, which was opened in 1860. Since 1937, the Ottweiler–Schwarzerden line (also called the Ostertalbahn, Oster Valley Railway) has branched off in Ottweiler; it is now used as a museum railway. The station is classified by Deutsche Bahn as a category 5 station.

== Entrance building ==
A half-timbered building was erected as a temporary station building in 1859. Due to financial difficulties of the Rhein-Nahe Railway (Nahe Valley Railway), however, the building remained in operation until 1877. The station building built in 1877 is one of the oldest in the Saarland and is a listed building. The two-storey, plastered building with a slated gabled roof (with the gable facing the tracks), is located west of the railway tracks. The windows and doors are built in the round-arch style (Rundbogenstil).

The Deutsche Bahn station building was closed in 1995. The station was sold to the town of Ottweiler in 2012. Its future use was still controversial in 2012. After renovation, the Ottweiler municipal library is now housed there.

== Services ==
Construction of the Oster Valley Railway commenced in 1934 and it was opened to Niederkrichen in 1937 and to Schwarzerden in 1938. Ottweiler became the southern terminus of this line and thus become an important transport hub. To accommodate this, the entrance building was slightly altered and an island platform was established, which was connected by an underground passage to the “home” platform. The line was closed in 1980.

The station is still open and is visited by approximately 1,300 rail passengers on 100 trains each weekday. Regionalbahn services operate every 30 minutes to Saarbrücken and hourly to Türkismühle. Regional-Express services operate hourly to Saarbrücken and Mainz and every two hours to Frankfurt. In addition, there is a heritage railway to Schwarzerden, which is operated by Arbeitskreis Ostertalbahn (Working Group Oster Valley Railway, AkO) e.V. The following services stopped at the station in 2025:

Line	Route	Frequency (mins)
RE 3	Rhein-Nahe-Express; Saarbrücken – Neunkirchen – Ottweiler – Türkismühle – Idar-Oberstein – Bad Kreuznach – Mainz (– Frankfurt Airport regional – Frankfurt)	60 (120)
RB 73	Saarbrücken – Neunkirchen – St. Wendel – Ottweiler – Türkismühle – Neubrücke (Nahe)	60
