= Bad Kreuznach station =

Railway station in Bad Kreuznach, Germany

Bad Kreuznach
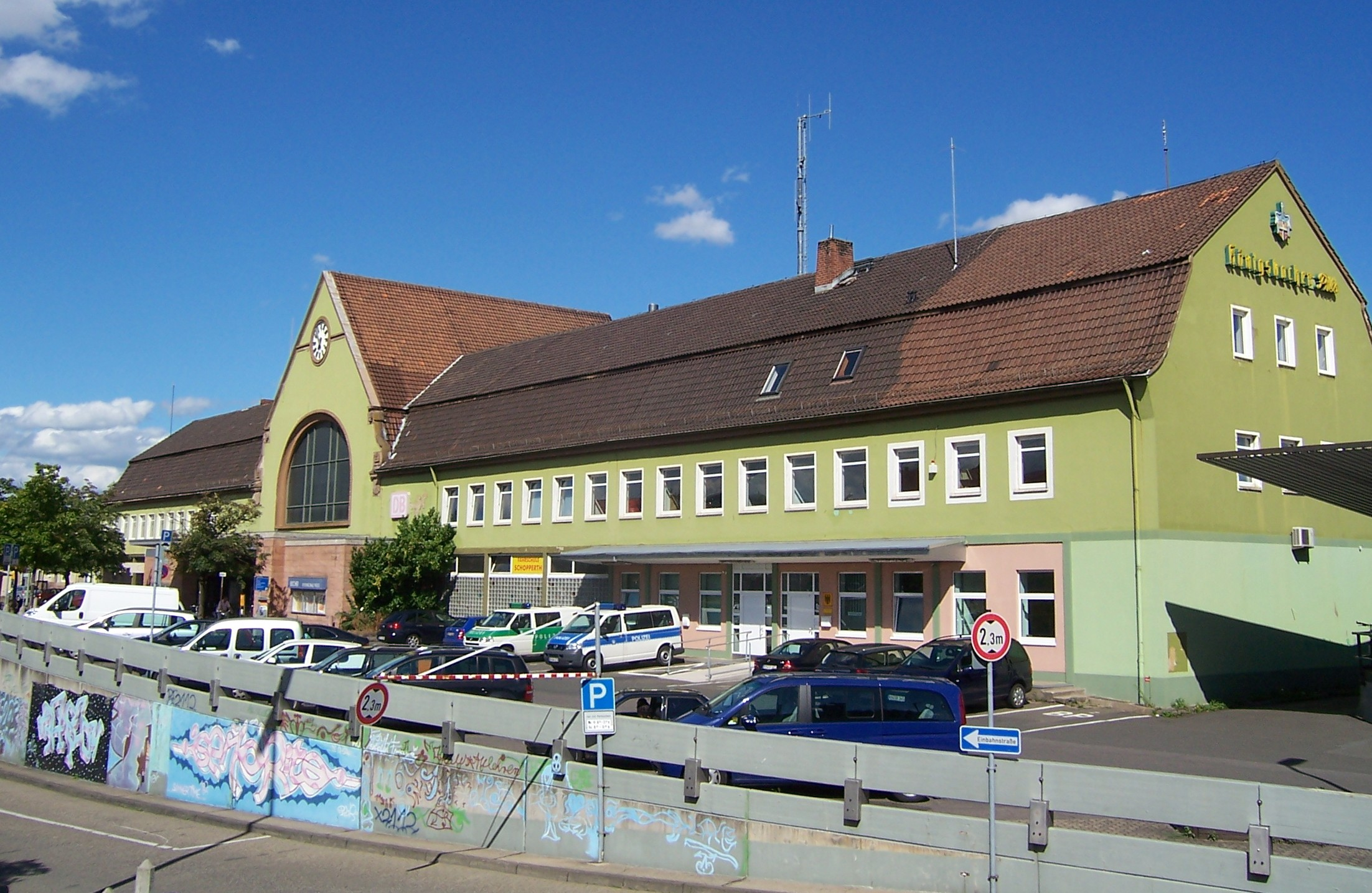

General information
- Location: Europaplatz 25, Bad Kreuznach, Rhineland-Palatinate; Germany
- Coordinates: 49°50′34″N 7°51′58″E
- Lines: Nahe Valley Railway (16.2) (KBS 672/680); Gau Algesheim–Bad Kreuznach (19.9 km) (KBS 680)
- Platforms: 5

Construction
- Accessible: Yes

Other information
- Station code: 296
- DS100 code: SBKN
- IBNR: 8000021
- Category: 3
- Fare zone: RNN: 400; : 6901 (RNN transitional tariff)
- Website: www.bahnhof.de

History
- Opened: 1905

Passengers
- 5000

Services
Preceding station	Vlexx	Following station
Bad Münster am Stein towards Saarbrücken Hbf	RE 3	Ingelheim towards Frankfurt (Main) Hbf
Bad Münster am Stein towards Kaiserslautern Hbf	RE 15	Gensingen-Horrweiler towards Bodenheim
Bingen Hbf towards Koblenz Hbf	RE 17	Bad Münster am Stein towards Kaiserslautern Hbf
Gensingen-Horrweiler towards Neubrücke (Nahe)	RB 33	Bad Münster am Stein towards Wiesbaden Hbf
Preceding station	DB Regio Mitte	Following station
Bad Münster am Stein towards Kaiserslautern Hbf	RB 65	Bretzenheim (Nahe) towards Bingen Hbf
Location

Bad Kreuznach station is the largest station in the town of Bad Kreuznach in the German state of Rhineland-Palatinate. The station is classified by Deutsche Bahn as a category 3 station. It is regularly served by Regional-Express and Regionalbahn services on the Nahe Valley Railway (Nahetalbahn). The station is located south-east of the town centre.

== History ==
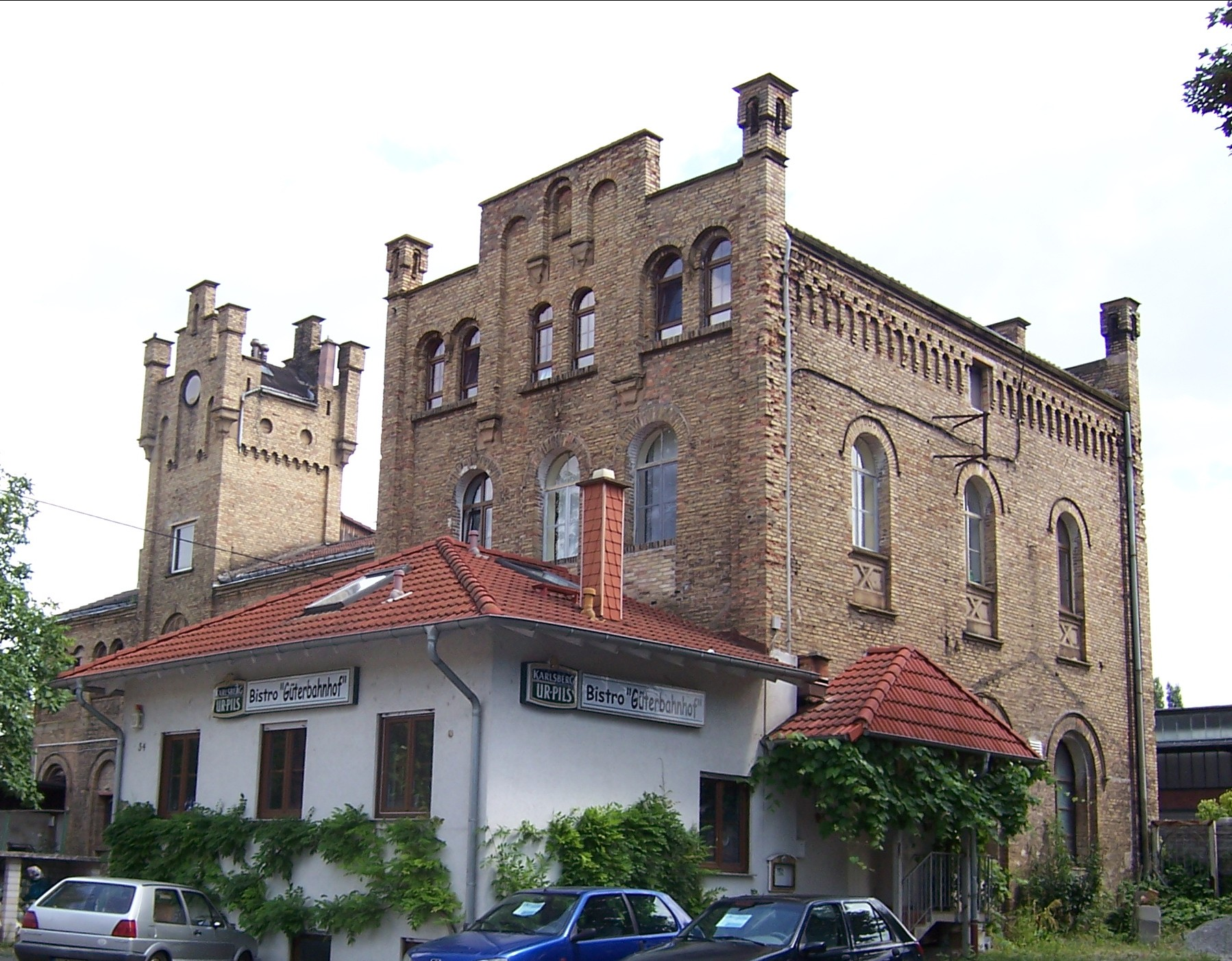
Former town station and later freight yard

The first station in Bad Kreuznach was opened in 1858 with the Nahe Valley Railway and was later used as a freight yard, which is now closed. Between 1896 and 1936, the Kreuznach Light Railways (Kreuznacher Kleinbahnen), a network of 750 mm gauge lines, also terminated at the station. On 1 June 1864 a second station opened in southern Bad Kreuznach called Kreuznach Bad to improve access to the southern part of the city. With the opening of the railway line to Gau-Algesheim in 1902, the present station was built at the junction of two lines between the two stations. The station went into operation in 1905 and the entrance building was built between 1905 and 1908. In due course the other two stations were closed.

== Infrastructure ==
The station is a Keilbahnhof ("wedge-shaped station") with 5 platform tracks. Tracks 1 and 2 are used by trains towards Kaiserslautern and Bingen and tracks 3–5 are used by trains to Mainz / Frankfurt and Saarbrücken. Bad Kreuznach station has an entrance building with a bakery, a newsagent, and a Deutsche Bahn ticket office. The platforms are equipped with seating and food vending machines. From the summer of 2011 to September 2014, the station was thoroughly renovated after a dispute between the town council and Deutsche Bahn. The platforms were raised, barrier-free access for the disabled and a new platform canopy was built. The station was also given additional access on the south side to Bosenheimer Straße.

== Passenger services ==
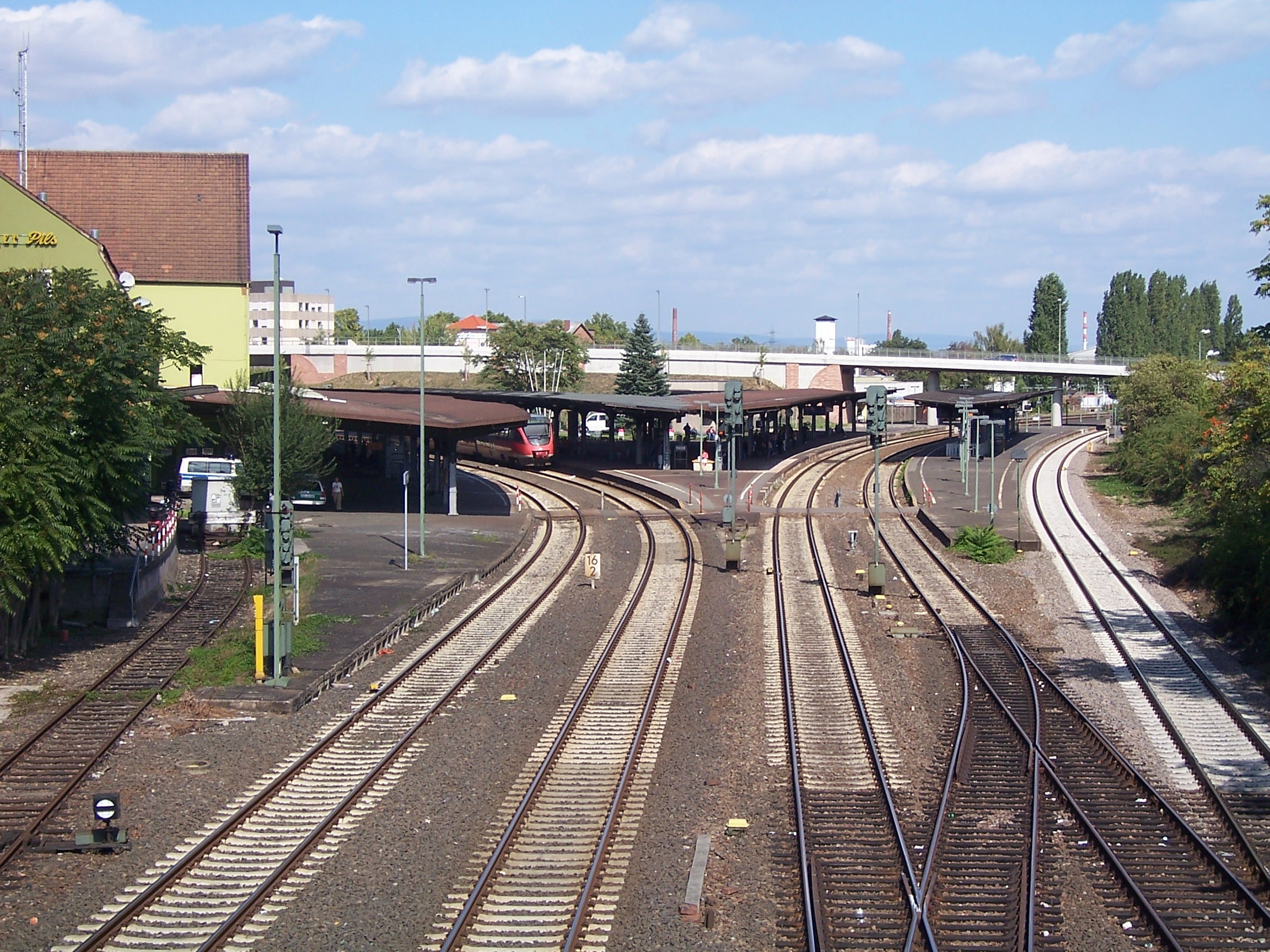
Fork of the tracks

Bad Kreuznach station is served by the following regional rail services:

Line	Route	Frequency
RE 3	Rhein-Nahe-Express; Saarbrücken – Neunkirchen – Ottweiler – Türkismühle – Idar-Oberstein – Bad Kreuznach – Mainz (– Frankfurt)	Hourly to Mainz, every 2 hours to Frankfurt
RE 17	Kaiserslautern – Winnweiler – Rockenhausen – Bad Kreuznach – Bingen – Koblenz	Every 2 hours
RE 15	Kaiserslautern – Rockenhausen – Bad Kreuznach – Mainz – Bodenheim	Mon to Fri: 1 train pair in the morning to Mainz, 1 train pair in the evening to Kaiserslautern
RB 33	Nahetalbahn; Idar-Oberstein – Bad Kreuznach – Mainz	Hourly
RB 65	Alsenztalbahn; Kaiserslautern – Winnweiler – Rockenhausen – Bad Kreuznach - Bingen (Rhein) Hauptbahnhof	Hourly
