= Birkenfeld Railway =

Overview
- Locale: Rhineland-Palatinate, Germany

Service
- Route number: 271c (old)

Technical
- Line length: 5 km (3.1 mi)
- Track gauge: 1,435 mm (4 ft 8 1/2 in) standard gauge

The Birkenfelder Eisenbahn (Birkenfeld Railway) was a five kilometer long rail line operating from Neubrücke to Birkenfeld. Birkenfeld had been bypassed by the Nahetalbahn (Nahe Valley Railway) due to routing difficulties. Since Birkenfeld was part of the Grand Duchy of Oldenburg, a treaty had to be signed with Prussia in order to build the railway.

The City of Birkenfeld saw the line as essential to its economic survival. Birkenfeld mayor Eissel had the railway licensed on December 2, 1879, and commissioned on October 15, 1880. At that time the railway was called the Birkenfelder Zweigbahn (Birkenfeld Branch Railway). The Königlich Preußische Eisenbahn-Verwaltung (KPEV) (Royal Prussian Railway Administration) and later the Deutsche Reichsbahn-Gesellschaft (DRG) (German Empire Railway Administration) maintained the privately held railway. In 1932, the DRG abandoned the railway due to low traffic.

On December 31, 1933, the Birkenfelder Lokalbahn GmbH (Birkenfeld Local Railway Company), later to be called the Birkenfelder Eisenbahn GmbH (Birkenfeld Railway Company), was formed. The shareholders in the railway were the City of Birkenfeld with a 72 percent share and Degussa with a 28 percent share. Degussa had a siding to service its factory in Brücken. With the closing of Degussa, the line was exclusively owned by Bikenfeld from July 19, 1969, onward.

On December 31, 1962, passenger service on the line was completely replaced by bus. This process began on October 2, 1955. The last freight train service was on September 30, 1991. The line was officially closed on December 31, 1994. Since then the rails have been removed.

Today a bike and walking trail are on the former railway's right-of-way.
