= Türkismühle station =

Railway station in Nohfelden, Germany

Türkismühle
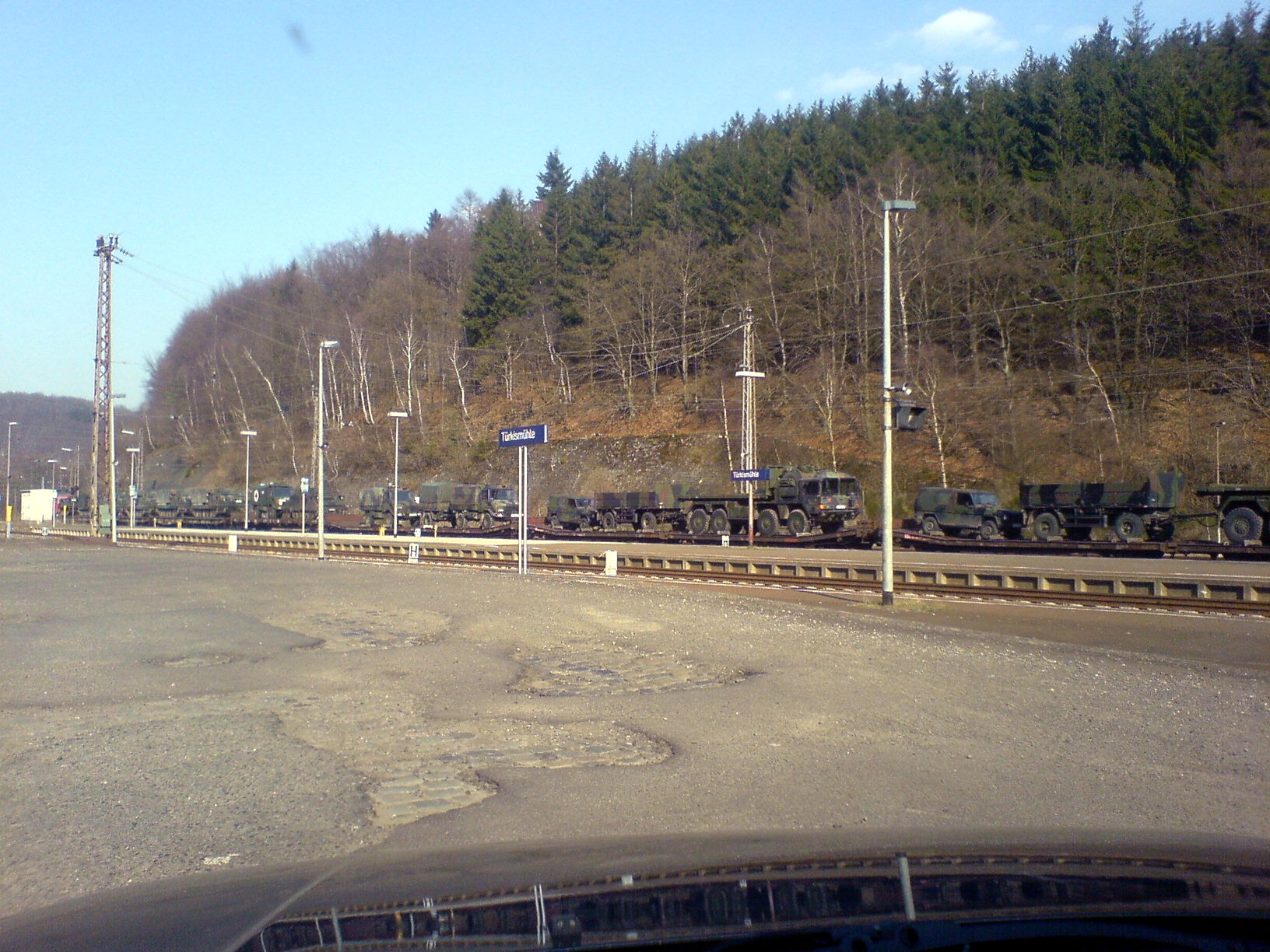
- Military train in Türkismühle station

General information
- Location: Saarbrücker Str. 16a, Nohfelden, Saarland; Germany
- Coordinates: 49°34′50″N 7°06′53″E
- Lines: Nahe Valley Railway (KBS 672/680); Hochwald Railway (heritage railway); Türkismühle–Kusel (closed)
- Platforms: 3

Construction
- Accessible: Yes

Other information
- Station code: 6288
- DS100 code: STM
- IBNR: 8000154
- Category: 4
- Fare zone: SaarVV: 642
- Website: www.bahnhof.de

History
- Opened: 26 May 1860

Services
Preceding station	Vlexx	Following station
St. Wendel towards Saarbrücken Hbf	RE 3	Neubrücke (Nahe) towards Frankfurt (Main) Hbf
Walhausen (Saar) towards Saarbrücken Hbf	RB 73	Nohfelden towards Neubrücke (Nahe)
Location

Türkismühle station is a station in the municipality of Nohfelden in the German state of the Saarland. The station is located on the Nahe Valley Railway (Nahetalbahn) and is the terminus of the Hochwald Railway (German: Hochwaldbahn), which formerly ran as far as Trier and the former Westrich Railway to Kusel. It was opened on 26 May 1860 during the extension of the Nahe Valley Railway from Idar-Oberstein to Neunkirchen.

== History ==
After its opening in 1860 the station was busy with freight traffic, but it was also used extensively by passengers. From the opening of the station many small businesses and restaurants were established in the immediate area. With the opening of the Hochwald Railway to Hermeskeil trade around the station began to deteriorate, as the transit traffic no longer had to stop at the station. A new station building was built before the outbreak of the First World War.

After the transfer of control of the Saar to the League of Nations in the wake of the Treaty of Versailles, Türkismühle station became a border station to Germany with customs facilities, resulting in an increase in population. In freight operations, there were some enhancements, such as the extensive expansion of the station premises and the creation of new freight operators. The line to Wolfersweiler was opened in November 1934 and extended to Kusel in 1936, establishing the Türkismühle–Kusel railway. The Saar returned to Germany in 1935. In 1937, the Deutsche Reichsbahn office was moved from Türkismühle to St. Wendel. In 1938, during the construction of the Siegfried Line, the station had 12 tracks.

During the Second World War, the station was also used to transport refugees. On 22 February 1945, the station was destroyed in an air raid. With the transfer of the Saar to French occupation in 1945, Türkismühle became a border station again, now between Germany and the French-administered Saar. In 1957, the Saarland became part of the Federal Republic of Germany and, in 1959, the station became part of the Deutsche Bundesbahn. From 1967, passenger traffic began to decline, and from 1969 there were no passenger services to Hermeskeil and on the Türkismühle–Kusel railway to Freisen, but the operation of electric trains from St. Wendel began in the same year.

== Rail services ==
Türkismühle is served by Regional-Express line RE 3 from Mainz to Saarbrücken and the Regionalbahn services from Türkismühle to Saarbrücken and from Mainz to St. Wendel. The Hochwald Railway is operated from Türkismühle by heritage trains and freight traffic. Only a short section of the Westrich Railway is still operated from Türkismühle; it is used for freight traffic. The Saarbrücken–Mainz line is electrified as far as Türkismühle.

Line	Route	Frequency
RE 3	Rhein-Nahe-Express; Saarbrücken – Neunkirchen – Ottweiler – Türkismühle – Idar-Oberstein – Bad Kreuznach – Mainz (– Frankfurt)	Hourly (to Mainz)
RB 73	Saarbrücken – Neunkirchen – St. Wendel – Türkismühle – Neubrücke (Nahe)	Hourly
