= Neunkirchen Hauptbahnhof =

Railway station in Neunkirchen, Germany

Neunkirchen (Saar) Hbf
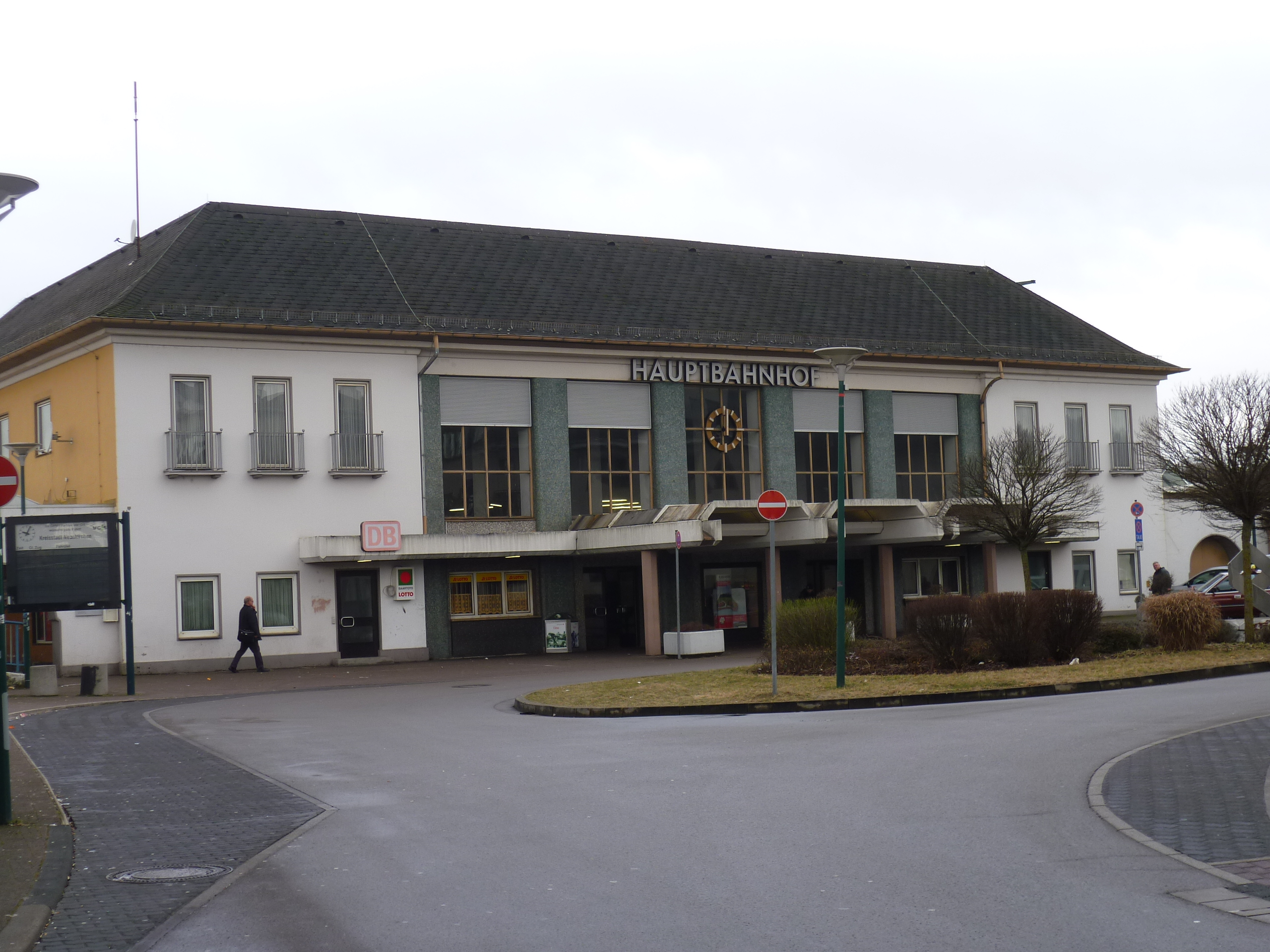

General information
- Location: Am Bahnhof 1, Neunkirchen, Saarland; Germany
- Coordinates: 49°21′11″N 7°10′36″E
- Lines: Homburg–Neunkirchen (KBS 683); Neunkirchen–Wemmetsweiler (KBS 683); Neunkirchen–Heinitz (ex 271f); Nahe Valley Railway (KBS 680)
- Platforms: 7 (one disused)

Construction
- Accessible: Yes

Other information
- Station code: 4426
- DS100 code: SNK
- IBNR: 8000272
- Category: 3
- Fare zone: SaarVV: 341
- Website: www.bahnhof.de

History
- Opened: 16 November 1852

Services
Preceding station	Vlexx	Following station
Saarbrücken Hbf Terminus	RE 3	Ottweiler (Saar) towards Frankfurt (Main) Hbf
Landsweiler-Reden towards Saarbrücken Hbf	RB 73	Wiebelskirchen towards Neubrücke (Nahe)
Schiffweiler towards Illingen (Saar)	RB 74	Neunkirchen (Saar)-Wellesweiler towards Homburg Hbf
Schiffweiler towards Saarbrücken Hbf	RB 76	Neunkirchen (Saar)-Wellesweiler towards Homburg Hbf
Location

Neunkirchen Hauptbahnhof is a railway station in the district town of Neunkirchen in the German state of Saarland. Here the Nahe Valley Railway (Nahetalbahn) intersects with the Homburg–Neunkirchen railway and the Fischbach Valley Railway (Fischbachtalbahn). It is classified by Deutsche Bahn as a category 3 station.

== History ==
In July 1850, construction of the first Neunkirchen station started during the construction of the Saarbrücken Railway from Bexbach to Saarbrücken. On 15 November 1850, the station was opened for freight traffic by the Palatine Ludwig Railway (Pfälzische Ludwigsbahn). The first passenger trains ran daily from April 1851 to Ludwigshafen and back. The station itself was officially opened on 15 or 16 November 1852 together with the Neunkirchen–Saarbrücken line. Eight years later, on 25 May 1860, the double-track Rhine–Nahe Railway (Rhein-Nahebahn) was completed to a new station building, the so-called Nahebahnhof ("Nahe station") built in its current location. The old station, dating from 1850, was completely demolished in the process.

As early as 7 September 1850, the first coal train ran on the branch line from Heinitz via Neunkirchen. In 1872, this was followed by the line to the König ("king") colliery. On 15 October 1879, the single-track line to Wemmetsweiler (now part of the Fischbach Valley Railway), was opened; this line was duplicated in 1891.

The station's tracks were remodelled between 1910 and 1922. A new marshalling yard was built in 1912 in the district originally called Schlawerie (now Sinnerthal). In December 1914, the underpasses and the five platforms were finished. The outbreak of war on 1 August 1914 delayed the construction of the station building considerably. The building was completed only in 1923; it was regarded as the most beautiful station built by the Deutsche Reichsbahn railway division of the Saarland. In 1937, daily traffic amounted to more than 3,000 carriages. At the same time it had 17 sidings.

On 27 May 1944, the station was severely damaged in an air raid. The station building was severely damaged. Only the right pavilion was largely undamaged. On 21 March 1945 Neunkirchen was taken by American troops. Reconstruction began and rail traffic was resumed. On 31 May 1945, the first scheduled passenger trains ran between Neunkirchen and Türkismühle. Since the line between Saarbrücken and Homburg (the Palatine Ludwig Railway) was heavily damaged, the less damaged lines from Saarbrücken to Neunkirchen (the Nahe Valley Railway via Sulzbach and the Fischbach Valley Railway) was repaired and returned to operations on 25 June 1945. Also re-opened were the Neunkirchen–Homburg line (with Homburg Central Station still closed) and the Nahe Valley Railway from Neunkirchen to Bad Kreuznach.

The badly damaged Neunkirchen station was not rebuilt until the end of 1947. The left wing was rebuilt and the roof was replaced completely. The entrance building and the pavilion, which had previously been separate were now joined by a hipped roof. In the following years only minor architectural changes were made to the exterior and the interior. Otherwise, the building has been preserved in this form until today.

The station played a major role because of the heavy industrialisation of Neunkirchen with coal mines and the steel works. In 1955, there were up to 275 passenger train arrivals and departures daily, including four express trains. The number of freight trains was very high. In November 1965, 3 new signal boxes with relay interlockings went into operation and replaced 10 old signal boxes. The signals from Bexbach to Dudweiler are remotely controlled from the signal box Nof.

On 13 May 1966, electric trains began running through Neunkirchen on the line from Wemmetsweiler to Homburg. Freight traffic to Heinitz was abandoned in 1963 and all traffic was abandoned to the König colliery in 1970.

== Platforms ==
Following the upgrade of 1914 there were six platforms in Neunkirchen:

- platform 1: for trains to Homburg and to and from Heinitz, now tracks 26 and 27,
- platform 2: arrival of the trains from Homburg, now track 25,
- platform 3: for trains towards Bingen, Mainz and Frankfurt/M, now track 1,
- platform 4: for trains towards Saarbrücken, now tracks 2 and 3,
- platform 5 (closed since ca 1990): for trains to and from Wemmetsweiler/Lebach, also towards Bingen, today tracks 4 (dismantled) and 7 (unused for passenger trains)
- platform 6 (closed since 1965): for trains to and from different destinations (mostly regional), goods services, luggage, mail services and used for shunting coaches, today tracks 8 and 9 (used for shunting and goods trains).

== Current situation ==
After the decline of the coal and steel industry in Neunkirchen more railway lines were closed. Of the previous five platforms only 4 are now in operation. Neunkirchen is a through station for the Nahe Valley Railway from Saarbrücken to Bingen (timetable route—KBS—680), the Neunkirchen–Wemmetsweiler line (KBS 683) and the Illingen–Homburg line (KBS 683).

== Rail services ==
Neunkirchen station was served by the following regional rail services in 2025:

Line	Route	Frequency (mins)
RE 3	Rhein-Nahe-Express; Saarbrücken – Neunkirchen – Ottweiler – Türkismühle – Idar-Oberstein – Bad Kreuznach – Mainz (– Frankfurt Airport regional – Frankfurt)	60 (120)
RB 73	Saarbrücken – Neunkirchen – St. Wendel (– Türkismühle – Neubrücke (Nahe))	60
RB 74	(Illingen – Wemmetsweiler –) Neunkirchen – Homburg	20 (60)
RB 76	Saarbrücken – Wemmetsweiler – Neunkirchen – Homburg	4 times daily

== Bibliography ==
- Harrer, Kurt (1984). Eisenbahnen an der Saar (in German). Düsseldorf: Alba Buchverlag. ISBN 3-87094-210-X.
- Schwan, Jutta (2005). "Eisenbahn und Bahnhöfe in Neunkirchen". In Rainer Knauf und Christof Trepesch (ed.). Neunkircher Stadtbuch (in German). Kreisstadt Neunkirchen. ISBN 3-00-015932-0.
- Die Geschichte des Neunkircher Bahnhofs (in German). Verkehrsverein Neunkirchen. 1989.
- Archiv der Bahnhöfe (in German). Geranova Verlag.
- Eisenbahnatlas Deutschland [German railway atlas]. Schweers + Wall. 2017. ISBN 978-3-89494-146-8.
