= Idar-Oberstein station =

Railway station in Idar-Oberstein, Germany

Idar-Oberstein
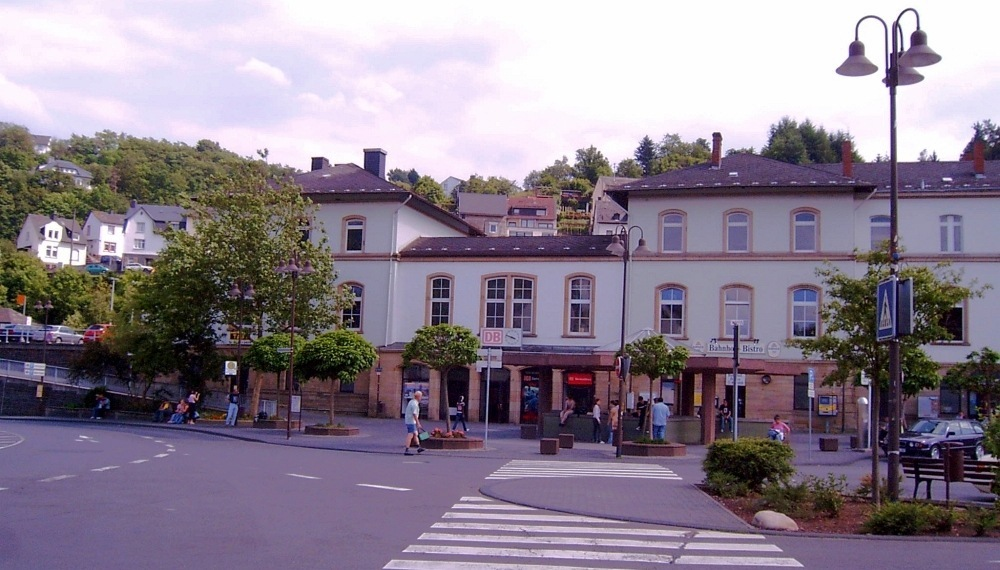

General information
- Location: Bahnhofstr. 20, Idar-Oberstein, Rhineland-Palatinate; Germany
- Coordinates: 49°41′58″N 7°19′16″E
- Owner: Deutsche Bahn
- Operator: DB Station&Service
- Lines: Nahe Valley Railway (67.9 km) (KBS 672/680)
- Platforms: 3

Construction
- Accessible: Yes

Other information
- Station code: 2964
- DS100 code: SIDO
- IBNR: 8003040
- Category: 4
- Fare zone: RNN: 450
- Website: www.bahnhof.de

History
- Opened: 15 December 1859

Services
Preceding station	Vlexx	Following station
Neubrücke (Nahe) towards Saarbrücken Hbf	RE 3	Kirn towards Frankfurt (Main) Hbf
Kronweiler towards Neubrücke (Nahe)	RB 33	Fischbach-Weierbach towards Wiesbaden Hbf
Kronweiler towards Baumholder	RB 34	Fischbach-Weierbach towards Kirn
Location
- Location within Rhineland-Palatinate Location within Germany Location within Europe

Idar-Oberstein station serves the town of Idar-Oberstein in the German state of Rhineland-Palatinate. It is on the Nahe Valley Railway (German: Nahetalbahn) and is classified by Deutsche Bahn as a category 4 station. It is regularly served by Regional-Express and Regionalbahn services and in the past it was served by freight traffic. The station is located in the centre of Idar-Oberstein.

== History ==
Idar-Oberstein station was opened on 15 December 1859 as Oberstein station. At that time the only line ran to Bingen am Rhein. In 1860, the Nahe Valley Railway was completed to the Saarland, making train travel possible to Neunkirchen, where there was a connection to the Palatine Ludwig Railway (Pfälzische Ludwigsbahn). Later links were also opened from the Nahe Valley Railway to the Glan Valley Railway (Glantalbahn), to Baumholder and the current district of Birkenfeld via the Birkenfeld Railway. Today, the Nahe Valley Railway is one of the main axes of passenger services in Rhineland-Palatinate. In addition, the station was formerly the starting point of the Idar-Oberstein tramway (1900 to 1956) and the Idar-Oberstein trolleybus service (1956 to 1969).

== Infrastructure ==
Idar-Oberstein station has an entrance building. In the course of renovation of the station, the platforms were renovated and made accessible for the handicapped by lift. In addition, the platforms were equipped with tactile paving. In November 2008, the building was completely repainted and decorated with pictures of the city's attractions.

== Rail services ==
Idar-Oberstein station is served by the following regional rail services:

Line	Route	Frequency
RE 3	Rhein-Nahe-Express; Saarbrücken – Neunkirchen – Ottweiler – Türkismühle – Idar-Oberstein – Bad Kreuznach – Mainz (– Frankfurt)	Hourly (to Mainz), every 2 hours (to Frankfurt)
RB 33	Nahetalbahn; Idar-Oberstein – Bad Kreuznach – Mainz	Hourly
RB 33	Nahetalbahn (Kirn –) Idar-Oberstein – Heimbach – Neubrücke (Nahe)	Individual services in the tourist season; between Kirn or Idar-Oberstein and Heimbach together with RB 34
RB 34	Nahetalbahn (Kirn –) Idar-Oberstein – Heimbach – Baumholder	Hourly (between Kirn and Idar-Oberstein only in the peak)
