= Neubrücke (Nahe) station =

Railway station in Hoppstädten-Weiersbach, Germany

Neubrücke (Nahe)
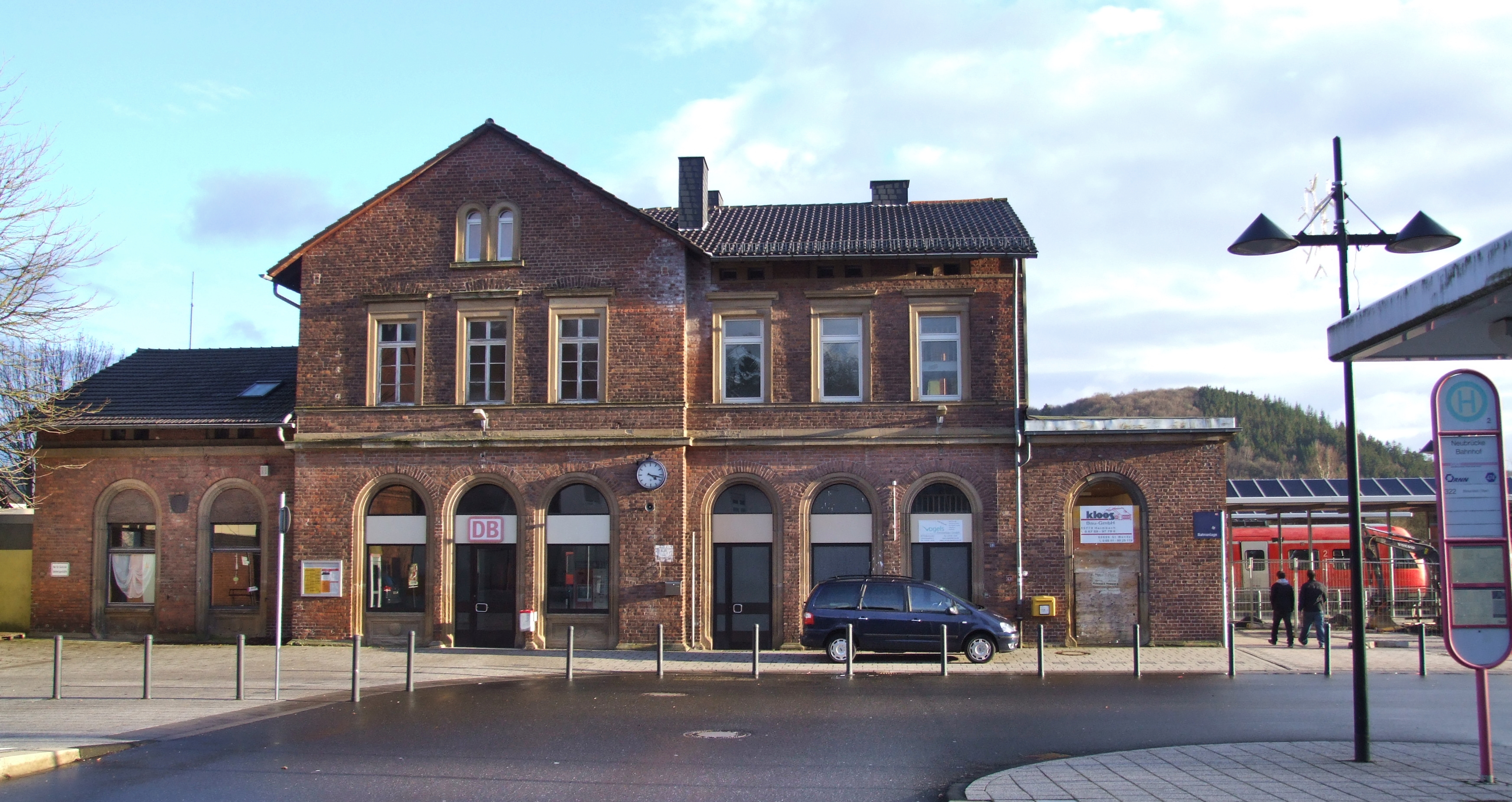
- View of the station forecourt and the entrance building

General information
- Location: Saarstr. 19, Neubrücke (Nahe), Hoppstädten-Weiersbach, Rhineland-Palatinate; Germany
- Coordinates: 49°36′20″N 7°10′12″E
- Lines: Nahe Valley Railway (km 85.7); Birkenfeld Railway (km 0.0) (closed)
- Platforms: 3

Construction
- Accessible: Yes

Other information
- Station code: 4364
- DS100 code: SNBR
- IBNR: 8004253
- Category: 4
- Fare zone: RNN: 474
- Website: www.bahnhof.de

History
- Opened: 26 May 1860

Services
Preceding station	Vlexx	Following station
Türkismühle towards Saarbrücken Hbf	RE 3	Idar-Oberstein towards Frankfurt (Main) Hbf
Terminus	RB 33	Hoppstädten (Nahe) towards Wiesbaden Hbf
Nohfelden towards Saarbrücken Hbf	RB 73	Terminus
Location

Neubrücke (Nahe) station is a station in the town of Neubrücke (Nahe) in the municipality of Hoppstädten-Weiersbach in the German state of Rhineland-Palatinate. It is on the Nahe Valley Railway (Nahetalbahn) and was the terminus of the Birkenfeld District Railway (Birkenfelder Kreisbahn) to the district seat of Birkenfeld from 1880 to 1991. It was opened with the extension of the Nahe Valley Railway from Idar-Oberstein to Neunkirchen (Saar) on 26 May 1860.

== Location ==
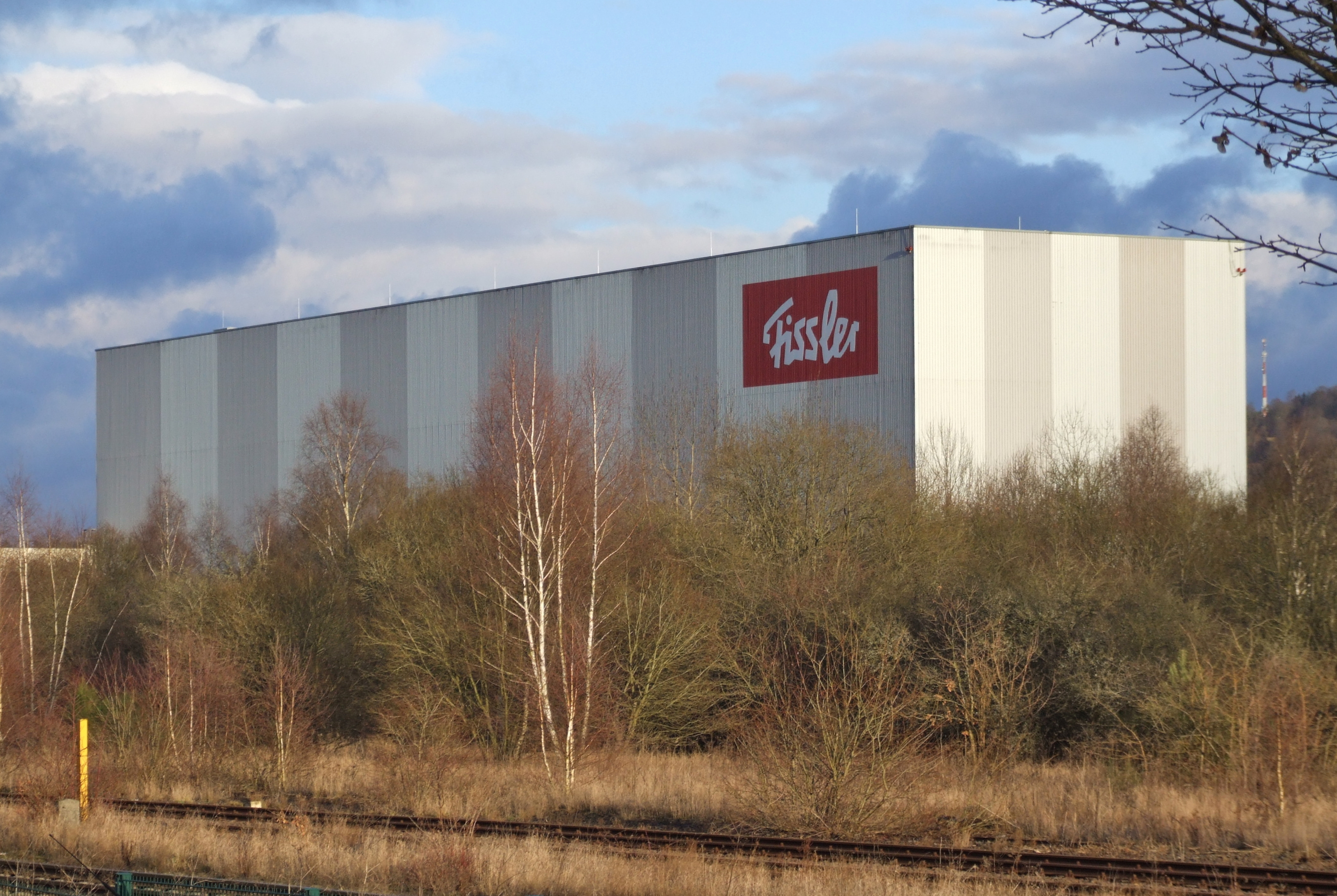
View from the station parking area over the tracks to the tall warehouse of the cookware manufacturer Fissler

Neubrücke station is located in the southeast of Neubrücke. Its address is Saarstraße 19. The entrance building is heritage-listed.

== History ==
Neubrücke (Nahe) station was officially opened during the extension of the Nahe Valley Railway from Idar-Oberstein via Heimbach, Neubrücke, Türkismühle and St. Wendel to Neunkirchen (Saar) on 26 May 1860.

A branch line was opened on 15 October 1880 from Neubrücke to Birkenfeld, which made a connection from the district seat to the Nahe Valley Railway and thus to the national railway network. This route was built by Birkenfelder Lokalbahn GmbH.

After the end of the Second World War, the Birkenfeld Railway lost significance, as trade with the nearby Saar Protectorate, which was occupied by France, was restricted. This situation was only resolved in the 1950s. From the 1960s onwards several bus routes were established, which ran parallel to the line.

Financial problems at Degussa AG and Birkenfelder Ziegelei, which were connected to the railway, as well as decreasing passenger numbers finally led to the decommissioning and dismantling of the line in the 1970s and 1980s. It was closed on 30 September 1991. Passenger services ended as early as 1962. The entire infrastructure was then dismantled and a cycle path was established on the former track.

The Nahe Valley Railway was electrified between Türkismühle and Neubrücke in the summer of 2014, when it was closed for six weeks. Since then, Regionalbahn line RB 73, which previously ended in Türkismühle has continued to Neubrücke.

== Entrance building ==
The entrance building of Neubrücke station is protected as a monument under the Rhineland Palatinate Conservation Act. It is a one and two-storey sandstone structure, which was built around 1860.

== Operations ==
Neubrücke is served by Regional-Express line RE 3 from Frankfurt or Mainz to Saarbrücken as well as by a Regionalbahn service from Neubrücke to Saarbrücken (RB 73). In the working day peaks, individual Regionalbahn services on line RB 33 to and from Idar-Oberstein/Kirn end or start in Neubrücke.

The Saarbrücken–Mainz railway is electrified from Saarbrücken to Neubrücke.

Until 2014, Regional-Express services on line RE 3 were operated with class 612 tilting trains, but since the change of the operator in December 2014 to vlexx, services has been operated with LINT 54 and 81 sets.

On the Neubrücke (Nahe)–Saarbrücken section, services on Regionalbahn line RB 73 are operated with electric multiple units of classes 425 and 426 and on the Neubrücke–Idar-Oberstein(–Mainz) section, services on line RB 33 are operated with LINT 54 and 81 sets.

Line	Route	Interval
RE 3	(Frankfurt (Main) Hbf –) Mainz Hbf – Bad Kreuznach – Neubrücke (Nahe) – Türkismühle – St. Wendel – Neunkirchen (Saar) – Saarbrücken Hbf	Hourly (to Mainz), every 2 hours (to Frankfurt)
RB 33	(Kirn –) Idar-Oberstein – Heimbach – Neubrücke (Nahe)	individual services in the peak; operating between Kirn or Idar-Oberstein and Heimbach together with RB 34
RB 73	Neubrücke (Nahe) – Türkismühle – St. Wendel – Neunkirchen (Saar) Hbf – Saarbrücken Hbf	60 mins

Neubrücke (Nahe) station is also a stop for coach services on the Luxembourg–Frankfurt am Main route operated by DeLux-Express.
