= Bingen (Rhein) Hauptbahnhof =

Railway station in Bingen am Rhein, Germany

Bingen (Rhein) Hbf
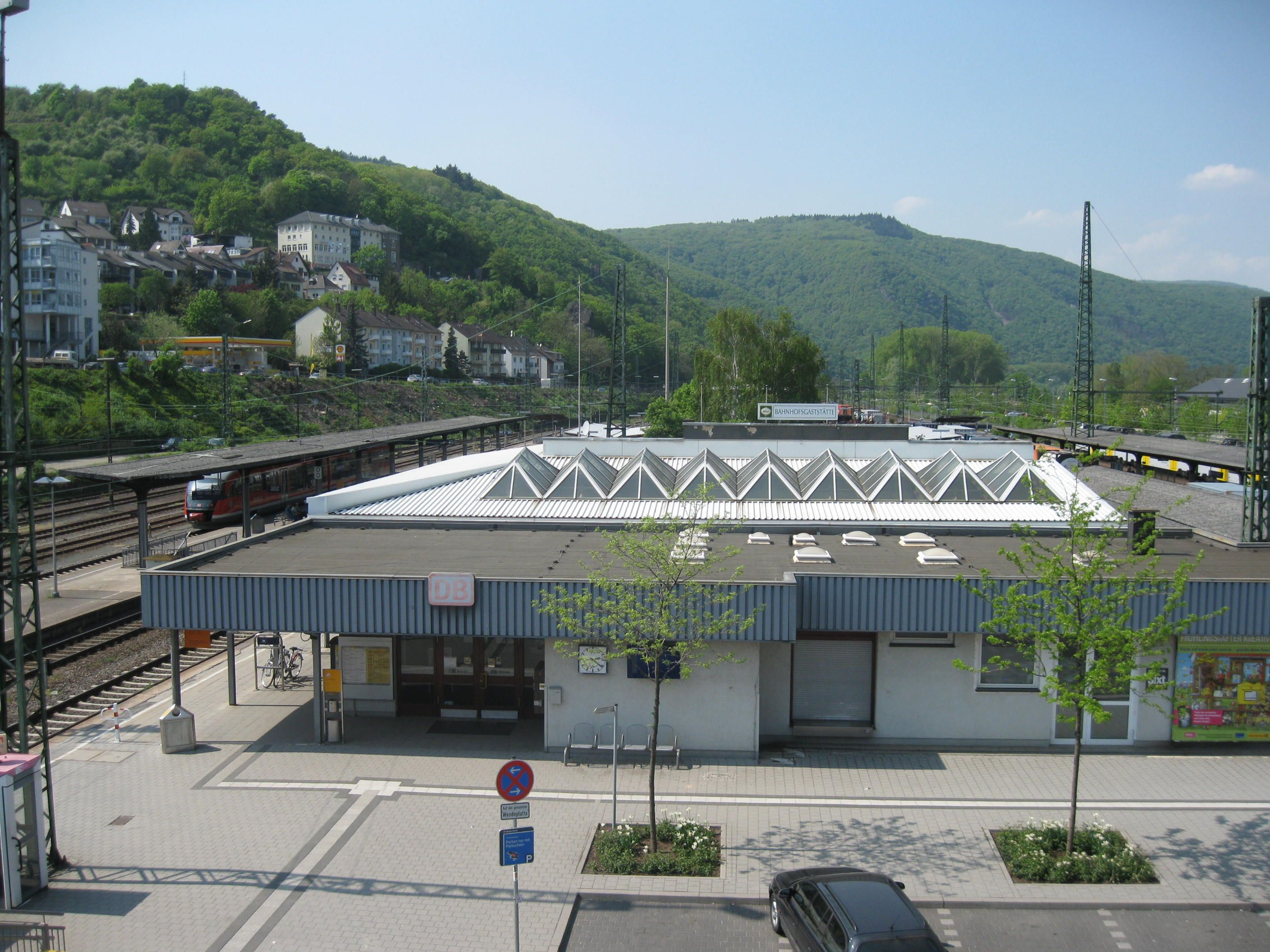
- View of the station from an overpass

General information
- Location: Bingerbrücker Straße 1, Bingen, Rhineland-Palatinate; Germany
- Coordinates: 49°58′07″N 07°53′01″E
- Lines: Cologne-Mainz; Bingen-Saarbrücken
- Platforms: 6

Construction
- Accessible: Yes

Other information
- Station code: 649
- DS100 code: FBGK
- IBNR: 8000039
- Category: 4
- Fare zone: RNN: 330; : 6880 (RNN transitional tariff)
- Website: www.bahnhof.de

History
- Opened: 15 July 1858; 168 years ago
- Former names: Bingerbrück
Services
Preceding station	DB Fernverkehr	Following station
Koblenz Hbf One-way operation	ICE 1 Sprinter	Mainz Hbf towards Nürnberg Hbf
Koblenz Hbf towards Berlin Ostbahnhof	ICE 19	Mainz Hbf towards Stuttgart Hbf
Preceding station	DB Regio Mitte	Following station
Oberwesel towards Frankfurt (Main) Hbf	RE 2 Südwest-Express	Ingelheim towards Koblenz Hbf
Terminus	RB 65	Münster-Sarmsheim towards Kaiserslautern Hbf
Preceding station	Trans Regio	Following station
Trechtingshausen towards Köln Messe/Deutz	RB 26	Bingen Stadt towards Mainz Hbf
Preceding station	Vlexx	Following station
Oberwesel towards Koblenz Hbf	RE 17	Bad Kreuznach towards Kaiserslautern Hbf
Location

Bingen (Rhein) Hauptbahnhof is a railway station in the German city of Bingen am Rhein on the West Rhine Railway. It is located in the borough of Bingerbrück. The station that serves central Bingen is called Bingen Stadt.

The station is served by InterCityExpress and regional trains. It is a junction station where the Nahe Valley Railway branches of the West Rhine Railway (left bank line). It formerly also included a marshalling yard. The station is classified by Deutsche Bahn as a category 4 station.

== Location ==
Bingen Hbf is located in the district of Bingerbrück in the city of Bingen am Rhein and extends along the Rhine almost to the Nahe. Bingen Stadt (town) station is less than 2 kilometres to the southeast. The town station is located in the town's centre and its bus station gives better access to the town's bus services than the Hauptbahnhof.

Three of the attractions of The Industrial Heritage Trail Rhine-Main (Route der Industriekultur Rhein-Main), which links tourist attractions related to the industrial heritage of the Rhine Main Area, are located at Hauptbahnhof:

- the pedestrian tunnel that formerly ran under the marshalling yard;
- the historic roundhouse building used by railways for servicing locomotives;
- the historic railway control centre spanning all tracks.

== History ==
The station was opened on 15 July 1858 as Bingerbrück station along with the first section of the Nahe Valley Railway. On the opposite side of the Nahe river was Bingen (now Bingen Stadt) station on the left bank section of the Hessian Ludwig Railway (Hessische Ludwigsbahn).

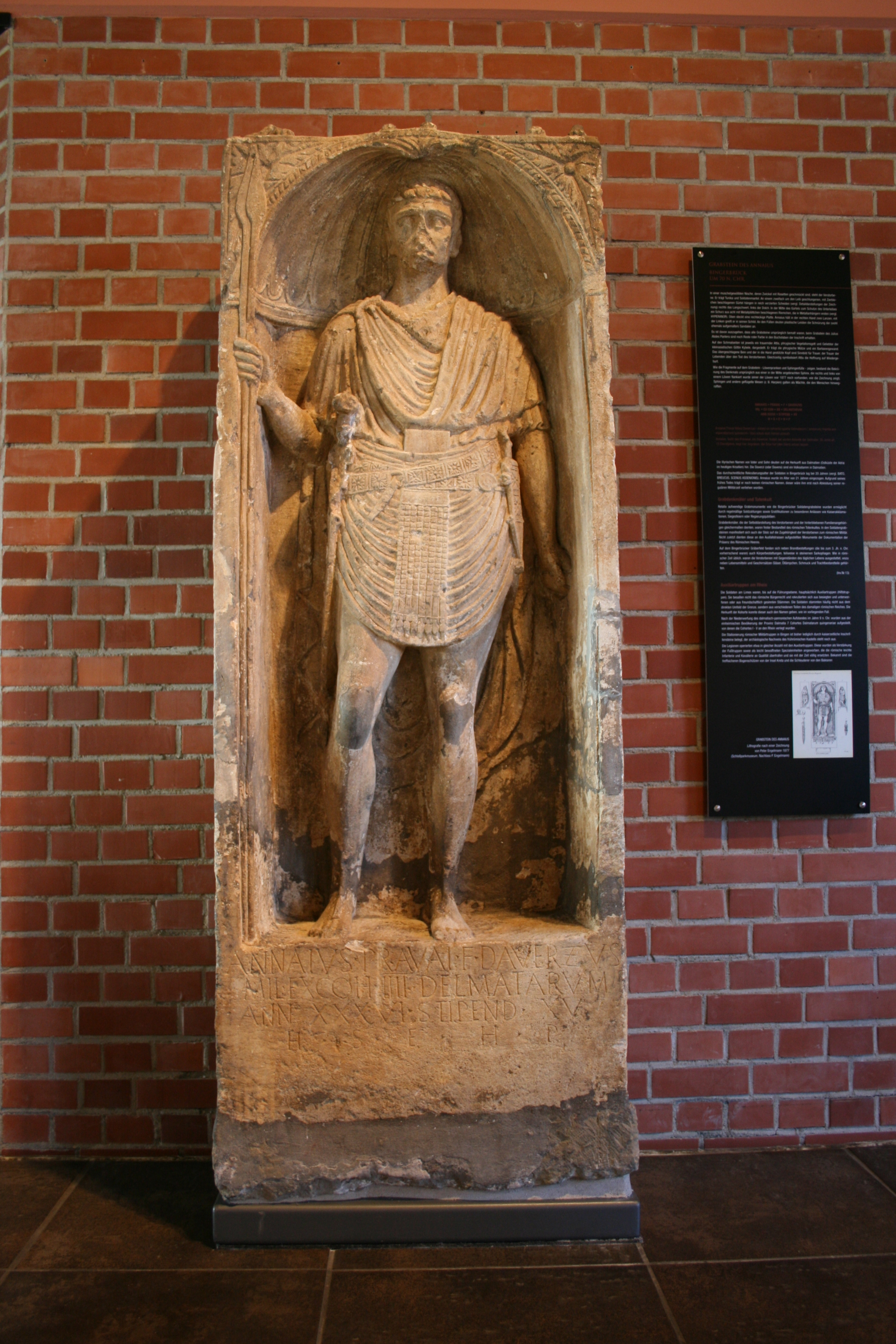
Epitaph of Annaius Daverzus in museum Römerhalle in Bad Kreuznach.

During the construction of the main railway station a Roman necropolis was discovered, revealing numerous tombstones of Roman military and civil auxilia. The tombstone of Annaius, a member of the cohors IV Delmatarum, shows a detailed aspect of Roman weapons and clothing dating back to the first half of the 1st century.

On 17 October 1859, both stations were connected by a bridge. Bingerbrück station therefore became a border station on the former border between the Kingdom of Prussia and the Grand Duchy of Hesse. On 15 December 1859, the Koblenz–Bingerbrück section of the left bank was opened by Rhenish Railway Company (Rheinische Eisenbahn-Gesellschaft). In order to improve the carriage of freight from the Saar region to the region of Wiesbaden and Frankfurt, the Rhine-Nahe Railway (Rhein-Nahe-Eisenbahn, the owner of the Nahe Valley Railway) and the Nassau State Railway (Nassauische Staatsbahn) decided to set up the Bingerbrück–Rüdesheim train ferry for freight wagons. This ferry went into operation on the Rhine between Bingerbrück and Rüdesheim on 1 September 1862. In 1900, operations were discontinued and some years later it replaced by the Hindenburg Bridge. This railway bridge, connecting Bingerbrück and Rudesheim, was built in the years 1913 to 1915 and destroyed during the Second World War. Since then there has been no way for trains to cross the Rhine near Bingen.

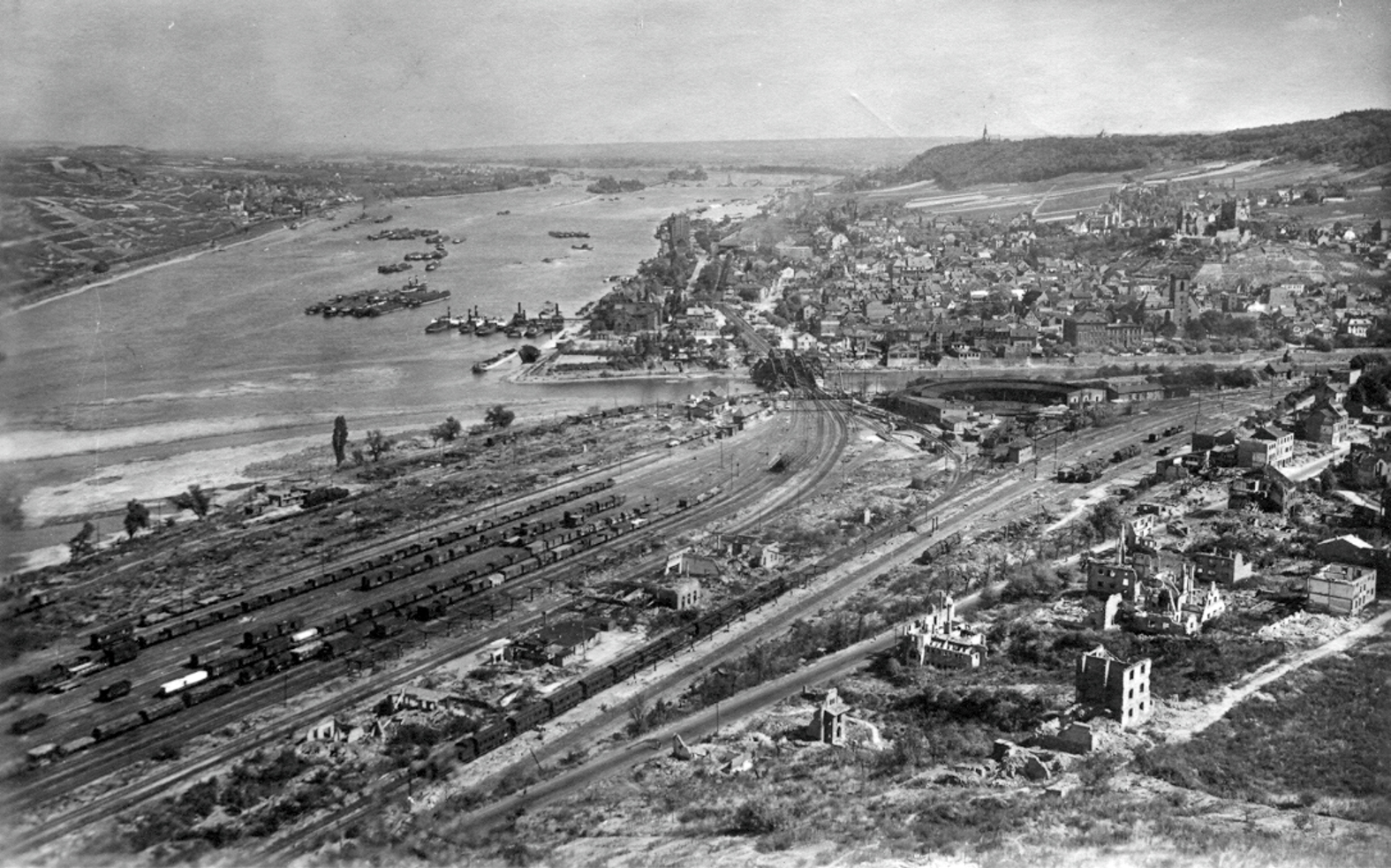
Bingerbrück area following bombing in the autumn of 1945

In 1960, Deutsche Bundesbahn built a wagon repair shed in the area of the former Bingerbrück harbour. The 3,000 square-metre shed was crossed by three parallel tracks, which were connected at both ends to the rail network. The wagon repair shed was closed after 18 years, in 1978, as a result of the centralisation of maintenance.

Since the municipal reform of 1969, Bingerbrück has been part of the town of Bingen am Rhein. Since then Bingen has had several stations. Because the Nahe Valley Railway connects with the West Rhine line at Bingerbrück and the station is also a stop for long-distance services, it is the most important station in the town of Bingen. For this reason, Bingerbrück station was renamed Bingen (Rhein) Hauptbahnhof in 1993.

The station's three signal boxes of Bingerbrück Ostturm (Bot), Bingerbrück Kreuzbach (Bkb) and Bingerbrück Westturm (Bwt) and the nearby Bnb signal box at Bingen Stadt were decommissioned on 3 February 1996 and replaced by the central interlocking Bf on the railway bridge at Bingen Hbf. The mechanical interlocking of Bingerbrück Ostturm was built in 1920 and was responsible for setting the points and signals on the Rhine line and for shunting towards Mainz.

The Hauptbahnhof was remodelled for the Rhineland-Palatinate State Garden Show (Rheinland-pfälzischen Landesgartenschau), which took place in Bingen in 2008. The disused marshalling and freight yards, which covered an area of 150,000 square metres and had two humps, were removed and the site was integrated into the Garden Show. In addition, the Bingerbrück Ostturm signal box, which was abandoned in 1996, was renovated for the show and converted into a museum. The 100-metre-long, twin-tube, brick tunnel that formerly ran under the tracks to the depot had to be filled due to serious damage. The entrance of the tunnel has been turned into a stage for an outdoor theatre. The old staircase at the entrance has been restored and serves as a seating area for the audience. These works were carried out in preparation for the horticultural show. In addition, an extra bridge, which was equipped with lifts and led to the area of the garden show, was established to provide barrier-free access for the disabled from the station's platforms to the garden show.

== Signal box ==
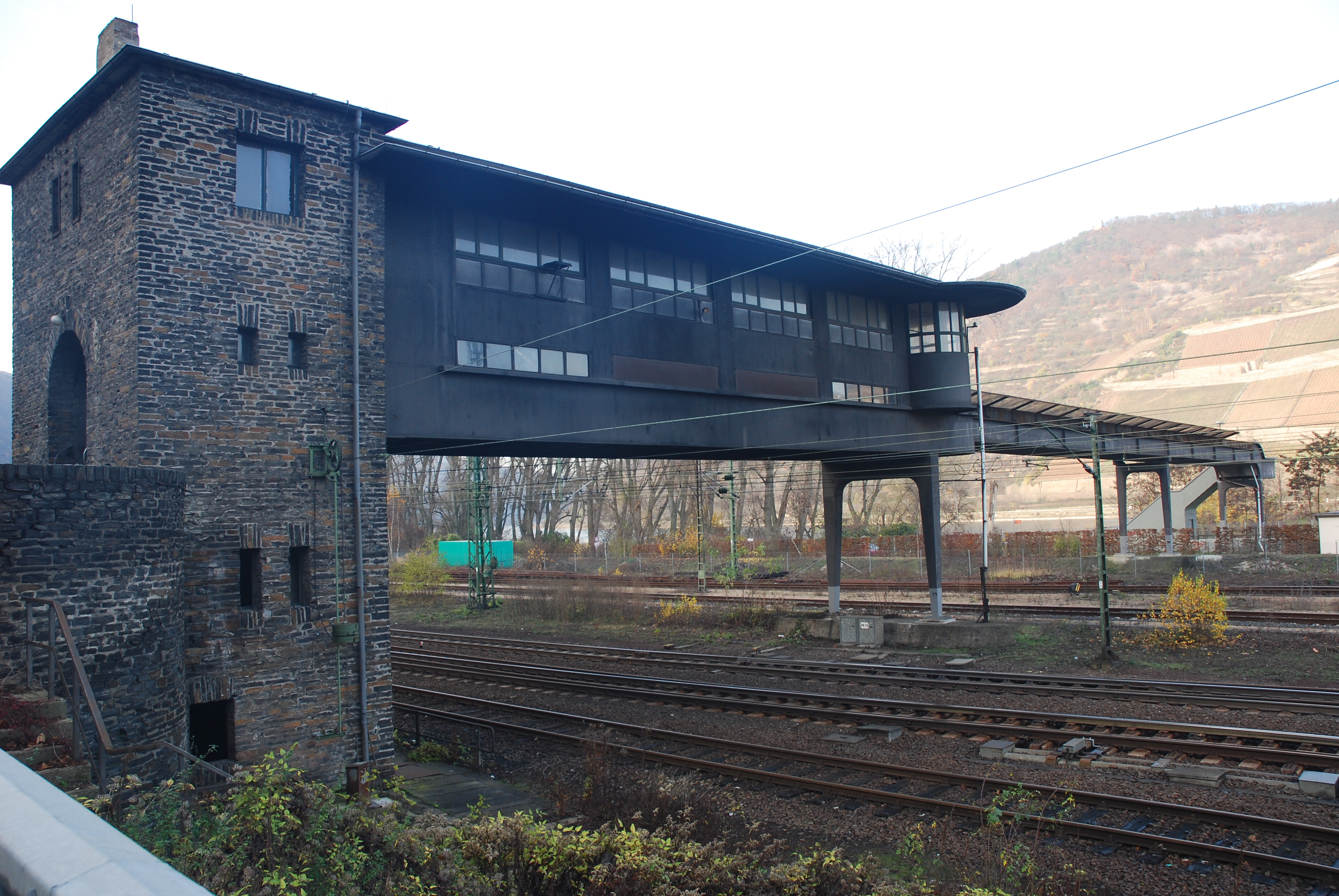
The gantry signal box in 2009

The Bingerbrück Kreuzbach (Bkb) signal box is located to the north of Bingen Hbf near the former southern hump of the marshalling yard. It is a gantry signal box, which increased the available room for operations by extending over the railway facilities. This signal box was designed by the architect Hans Kleinschmidt as a steel skeleton and was designed and completed in 1936. The western end of the building is built of broken stone. The actual signal tower is 15 metres long and in addition it has operating rooms and a pedestrian bridge. The interlocking system, which it housed, was a 10-metre-long electro-mechanical interlocking system of class E 43 made by the Siemens company. At its peak, the signal box was staffed by five people who were particularly responsible for the marshalling and operation of trains at the freight yard. In 1996, after 60 years of operations, the signal box, together with the other signal boxes, was removed from service and replaced by the central interlocking Bf on the Nahe bridge. The gantry signal box was listed as a historic landmark on 8 November 2005. In addition, it is now one of the cultural monuments listed in the UNESCO World Heritage Site of the Upper Middle Rhine Valley. After an inspection of the bridge carried out in 2006 found structural defects, access to the bridge was blocked. In April 2009, Bingen town council requested that the federal and state governments allocate funds for the preservation of the World Heritage Site towards the restoration of the signal box.

== Passenger station ==
In long-distance services, individual Intercity and EuroCity of lines 31 and 32 stop here on platforms 101 and 102.

Bingen Hbf has three platforms with six platform tracks for passenger service. The two platforms facing platform tracks 101 to 103 and 201 have a height of 55 centimetres and the platform between tracks 202 and 203 has a height of 38 centimetres. The station is used by three regional passenger services. The RE 2 Regional-Express service, between Koblenz and Frankfurt am Main, uses the same platforms. The RB 32 Regionalbahn service between Koblenz and Mainz, stops on tracks 201 and 103, where it is overtaken by long-distance or Regional-Express services. The RB 65 service, beginning or ending in Bingen Hbf and running to or from Kaiserslautern, normally stop on track 203. Additional peak hour services of this line stop on track 202. The station is classified by Deutsche Bahn as a category 4 station. In the 2026 timetable, the following services stopped at the station:

Line	Route	Frequency
ICE 1	Hamburg-Altona → Hamburg → Essen → Duisburg → Düsseldorf → Cologne → Bonn → Koblenz → Bingen → Mainz → Frankfurt Airport → Frankfurt → Würzburg → Nuremberg	One train
ICE 19	Berlin Ostbahnhof – Berlin Hbf – Berlin-Spandau – Hanover – Bielefeld – Hamm – Hagen – Wuppertal – Cologne – Bonn – Koblenz – Bingen – Mainz – Mannheim – Stuttgart	1 train pair
RE 2	Koblenz – Boppard – Bingen – Mainz – Frankfurt Airport – Frankfurt	120 min
RE 17	Koblenz – Boppard – Bingen – Bad Kreuznach – Rockenhausen – Winnweiler – Kaiserslautern	120 min
RB 26	Koblenz – Boppard – Oberwesel – Bingen – Ingelheim – Mainz	60 min
RB 65	Bingen – Bad Kreuznach – Rockenhausen – Winnweiler – Kaiserslautern	60 min

== Planning ==
As part of the Rhineland-Palatinate integrated regular interval timetable (Rheinland-Pfalz-Taktes) for 2015, it was proposed that the Trans-Hunsrück Railway (Hunsrückquerbahn) be reactivated and a rail connection provided to Frankfurt-Hahn Airport. This station would be served by a Regional-Express service running through Bingen and Mainz to Frankfurt. In addition, a new Regional-Express service would be created running between Koblenz and Kaiserslautern via Bingen.

The reactivation of the Trans-Hunsrück Railway from Langenlonsheim to Frankfurt-Hahn Airport has been delayed.
