= Vlexx =

German rail transport company

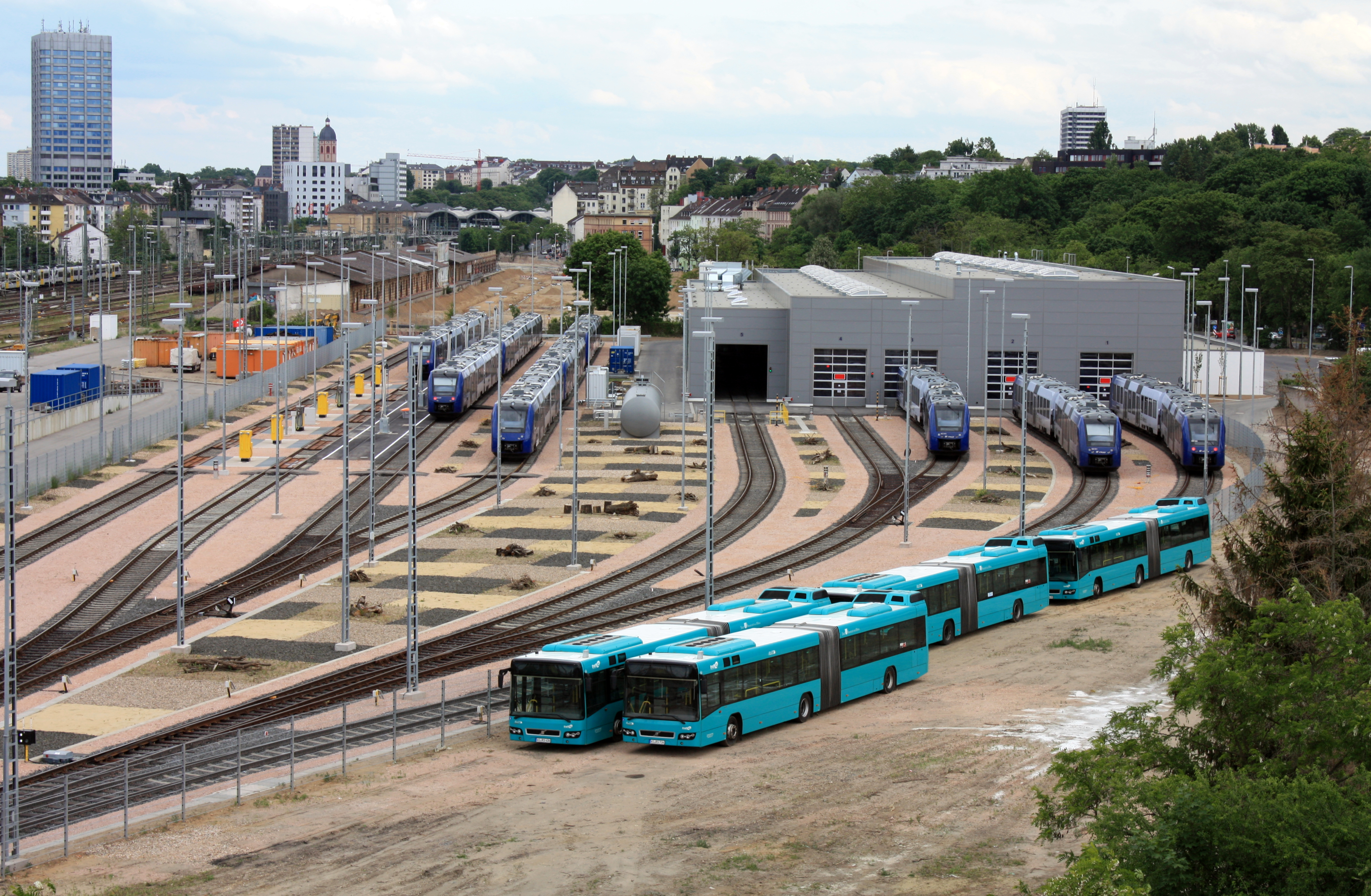
Company headquarters and depot in Mainz.

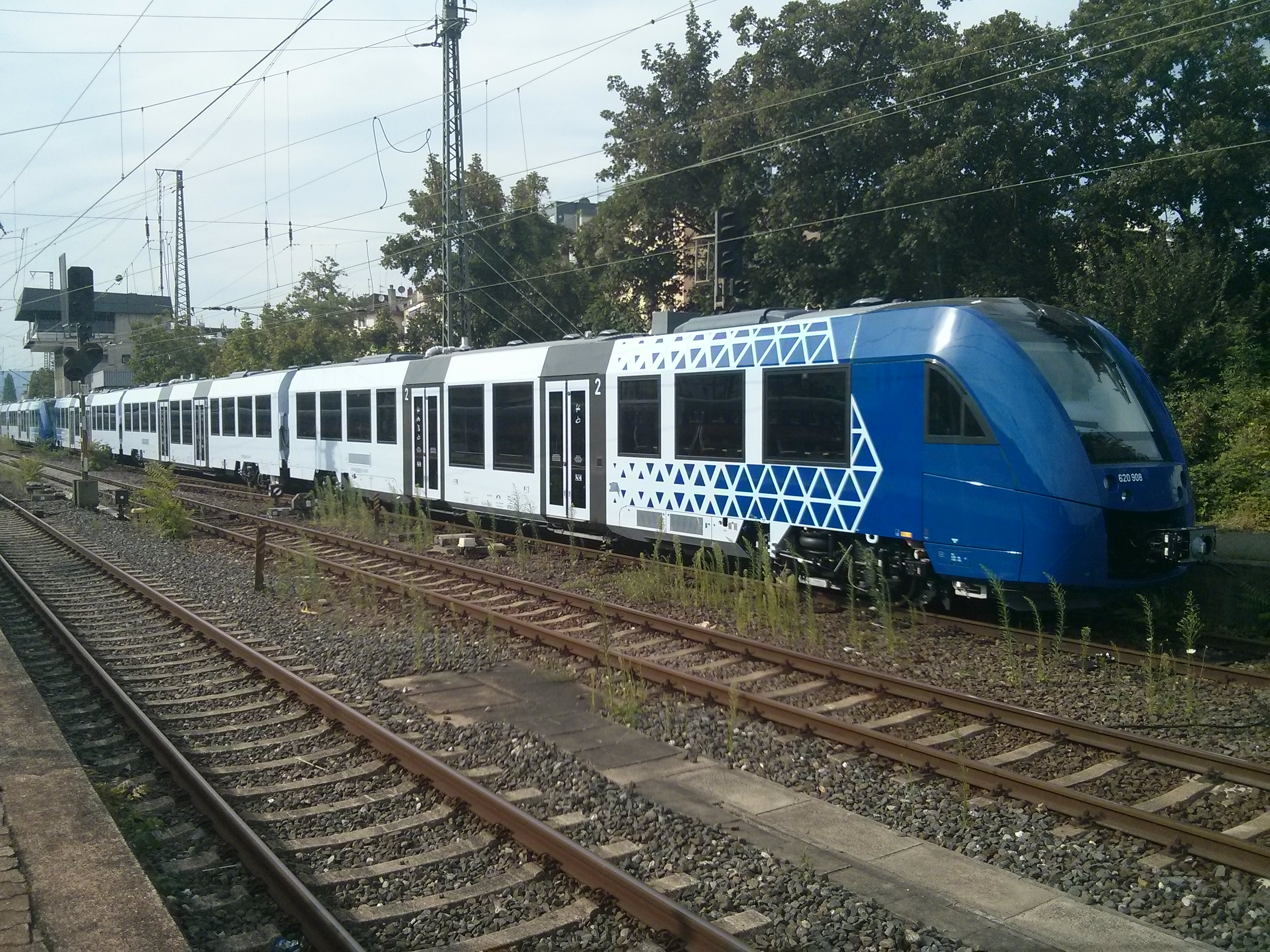
Alstom Coradia LINT 81 in Mainz.

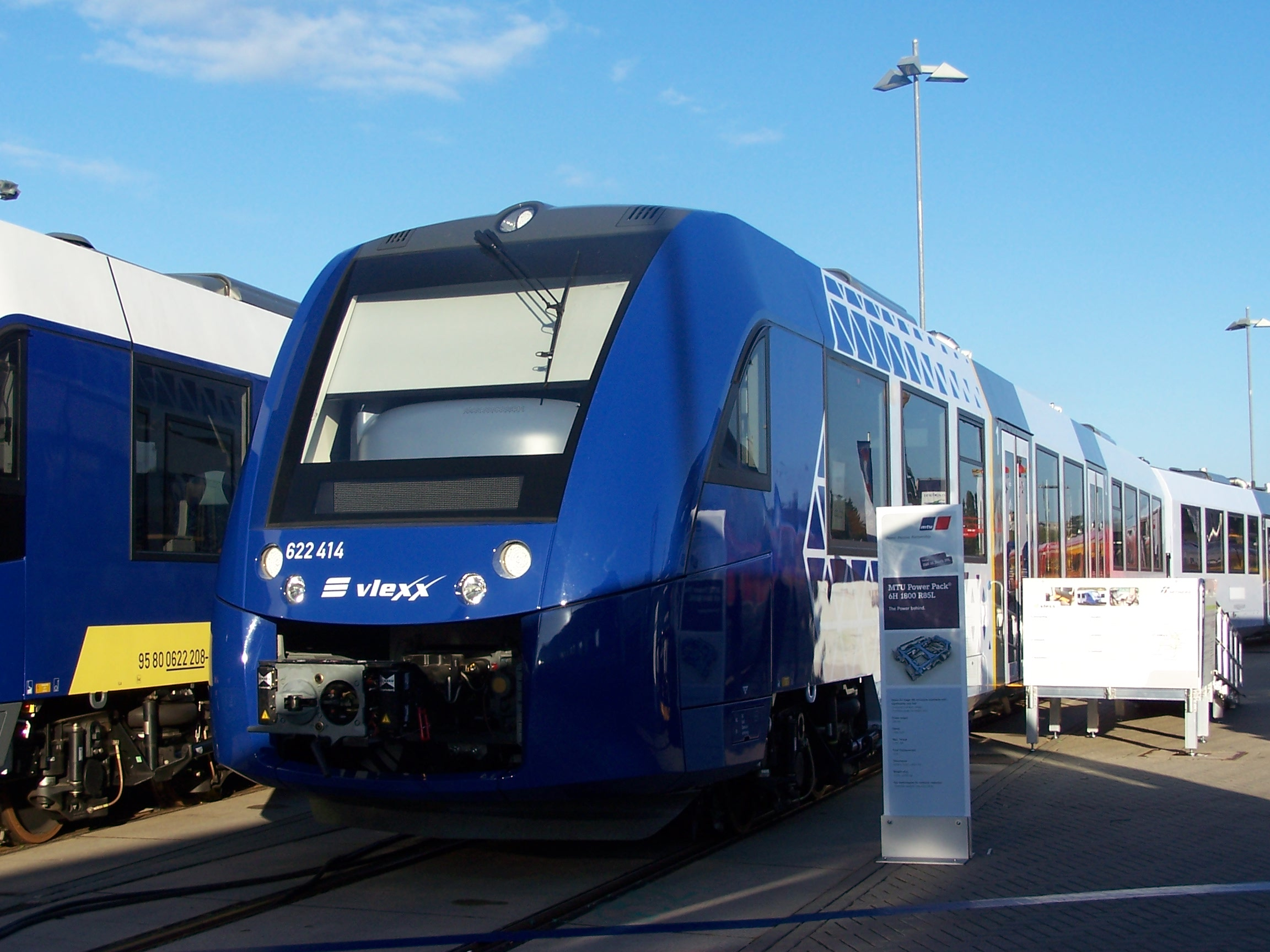
Alstom Coradia LINT 54 of vlexx at the InnoTrans 2014.

Vlexx GmbH (stylized in lowercase in its logo) is a rail transport company based in Mainz, Rhineland-Palatinate, Germany; it is a subsidiary of the Regentalbahn, which in turn has been part of the Italian state railway Ferrovie dello Stato (FS) since 2011 via its parent company Netinera. Vlexx operates local rail passenger transport exclusively with diesel railcars in Rhineland-Palatinate, Saarland and Hesse as well as a connection to France on the Winden-Wissembourg railway line into the Alsace to the railway station of Wissembourg.

== Name ==
The company was founded as DNSW in 2012 and derived from the so-called "diesel network southwest'", whose cornerstones are the Rhineland-Palatinate cities of Mainz, Koblenz, Worms, Kaiserslautern and Idar-Oberstein as well as Saarbrücken in the Saarland and Frankfurt am Main in Hesse. On weekends in the summer season there is also a train pair to Wissembourg in Alsace.

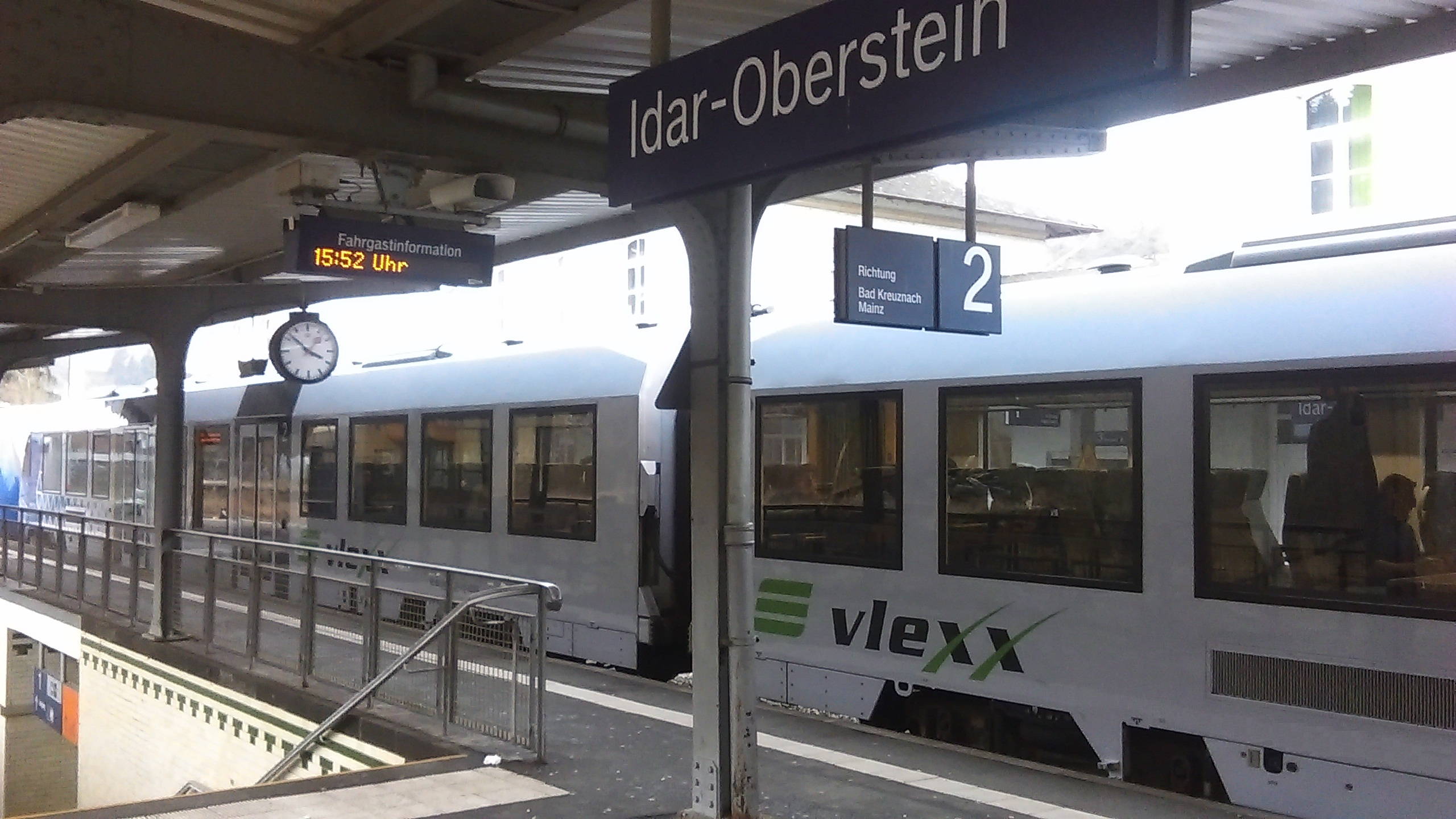
Idar-Oberstein station with a vlexx-train.

From the outset, the "DNSW" name was intended only as a temporary solution. In a name competition in January 2014, the public was able to participate in the naming process. In order to underline a regional reference of the company, a suitable name was sought. The choice fell on vlexx, der Vier-Länder-Express (vlexx, the four-country express).

== History ==
=== Invitation to tender for the diesel network ===
At the end of February 2012, the Regentalbahn was selected by the Zweckverband Schienenpersonennahverkehr Rheinland-Pfalz Süd (ZSPNV Süd) as the winner of the Dieselnetz Südwest - Los 2 tender. Since the 2014/2015 regular timetable change on 14 December 2014, the company has been operating the Mainz-Alzey-Kirchheimbolanden, Frankfurt-Mainz-Bad Kreuznach-Idar-Oberstein-Saarbrücken (Regional-Express services), Mainz-Bad Kreuznach-Kaiserslautern (a Regional-Express train pair during peak working hours) and Mainz-Idar-Oberstein-Baumholder/Neubrücke (Nahe) lines for 22.5 years until June 2037. In December 2016, an additional Regional-Express line was introduced on the Kaiserslautern-Bad Kreuznach-Bingen-Koblenz route, which means that 6.4 million train-kilometres per year now have to be covered. The diesel network southwest contains non-electrified main and secondary railways in Rhineland-Palatinate and connects the Rhenish Hesse, Nahe, Western Palatinate and Saarland regions in particular with the Rhine-Main region and the centres of Mainz, Rüsselsheim am Main and Frankfurt am Main as well as Frankfurt Airport.

A total of 63 LINT 54 and LINT 81 diesel railcars are used for train services. In the meantime, Regentalbahn founded DNSW, a subsidiary to which the provision of services was transferred. The DNSW was later renamed vlexx as part of a competition. The first new vlexx trains have been running since July 2014 on the future operating routes on a trial basis.

== Problems during the start of operations ==
On 27 November 2014 it became known that vlexx did not have enough train drivers to operate all train services at the timetable change 2014/2015. The former operator of the train services, DB Regio, was therefore commissioned by vlexx to operate individual train services.

When the operation started on 15 December 2014, there were massive train cancellations and, in some cases, delays lasting several hours. As a result, an emergency timetable was published on 17 December with which only about 50% of all train services were served. In addition, the managing directors were dismissed and replaced by Arnulf Schuchmann, the managing director of ODEG, which is also partly owned by Netinera. On 6 January 2015, the emergency timetable was extended in stages so that from 12 January about 90% of all train services could be served again. Since the beginning of March 2015, all contractually agreed connections have been served. This includes in particular the reactivated line between Heimbach and Baumholder, which was only served by a replacement bus.

After Vlexx took over the last service from DB Regio (Bodenheim-Kaiserslautern services) on 1 July 2015 with a six-month delay, train cancellations occurred again due to a lack of personnel. This affected five connections that were taken over by DB Regio and Transregio during the summer holidays in Rhineland-Palatinate or were completely cancelled.

== Tender of the E-Netz Saar ==
On January 9, 2017, the Ministry of Economy, Labour, Energy and Transport of the Saarland announced that vlexx had won Los 2 of the E-Netz Saar-RB, comprising 2.3 million train kilometers. The RB lines Saarbrücken-Neubrücke (Nahe), Saarbrücken-Neunkirchen (Saar)-Homburg and Homburg-Illingen will then be operated by the company. These are to be served by 21 Talent 3 electric railcars. The currently still non-electrified line from Saarbrücken to Lebach-Jabach is also included in the tender lot. This line will initially be operated with Desiro Classic diesel railcars, electrification is planned for 2024, and from then on Talent 3 electric railcars will also be operated there. As an alternative, the use of a battery electric multiple-unit train based on the Talent 3 is planned.

== Network ==
Line	Route	Frequency	Material	Image
RE 2	Koblenz Hauptbahnhof – Bingen (Rhein) Hauptbahnhof – Mainz Hauptbahnhof – Frankfurt (Main) Hauptbahnhof	Some trains (most operated by DB Regio Mitte)	LINT 54; LINT 81	
RE 3	Frankfurt (Main) Hauptbahnhof – Mainz Hauptbahnhof – Idar-Oberstein – Saarbrücken Hauptbahnhof		LINT 54; LINT 81	
RE 4	Frankfurt (Main) Hauptbahnhof – Frankfurt-Höchst – Mainz Hauptbahnhof	Some trains (most operated by DB Regio Mitte)	LINT 54; LINT 81	
RE 13	Frankfurt (Main) Hauptbahnhof – Mainz Hauptbahnhof – Alzey – Kirchheimbolanden		LINT 54; LINT 81	
RE 15	Bodenheim – Mainz Hauptbahnhof – Bad Kreuznach – Kaiserslautern Hauptbahnhof	One train pair	LINT 54; LINT 81	
RE 17	Koblenz Hauptbahnhof – Bingen (Rhein) Hauptbahnhof – Bad Kreuznach – Kaiserslautern Hauptbahnhof	120 mins	LINT 54; LINT 81	
RB 31	Mainz Hauptbahnhof – Alzey – Kirchheimbolanden		LINT 54; LINT 81	
RB 33	(Wiesbaden Hauptbahnhof–/Worms Hauptbahnhof–/Frankfurt (Main) Hauptbahnhof–) Mainz Hauptbahnhof – Bad Kreuznach – Idar-Oberstein		LINT 54; LINT 81	
RB 34	Kirn – Idar-Oberstein – Baumholder		LINT 54; LINT 81	
RB35	Worms Hauptbahnhof – Alzey – Bingen (Rhein) Stadt	Some trains (most operated by DB Regio Mitte)	LINT 54; LINT 81	
RB 53	Neustadt (Weinstraße) Hauptbahnhof – Wissembourg	Some trains (most operated by DB Regio Mitte)	LINT 54; LINT 81	
RB 72	Saarbrücken – Illingen – Lebach-Jabach		Hybrid battery-electric CAF Talent 3 (from Dec 2025)	
RB 73	Saarbrücken – Neunkirchen – Neubrücke		Electric CAF Talent 3	
RB 74	Homburg – Neunkirchen – Illingen		Electric CAF Talent 3	
RB 76	Saarbrücken – Neunkirchen – Homburg		Electric CAF Talent 3	

=== Excursion trains ===
Line	Route	Frequency	Material	Image
Weinstraßen-Express	Koblenz Hauptbahnhof – Bad Kreuznach – Neustadt – Wissembourg	April until October	LINT 54; LINT 81	
Elsass-Express	Mainz Hauptbahnhof – Alzey – Neustadt – Wissembourg	April until October	LINT 54; LINT 81	

== Contracting authorities and transport associations ==
The contracting authorities and transport associations of Vlexx for these services are:

- Rhineland-Palatinate, the Zweckverband Schienenpersonennahverkehr Rheinland-Pfalz Nord (SPNV-Nord) as well as the Zweckverband Schienenpersonennahverkehr Rheinland-Pfalz Süd (ZSPNV Süd)
- Hesse, the Rhein-Main-Verkehrsverbund (RMV)
- Saarland, the Ministry of Economy, Labour, Energy and Transport

The vlexx lines operate in the transport associations Rhein-Main (RMV), Rhein-Nahe (RNN), saarVV, Rhein-Neckar (VRN) and Rhein-Mosel (VRM).
