= Saardom =

Church in Dillingen, Germany

Coordinates: 49°21′23″N 6°43′35″E

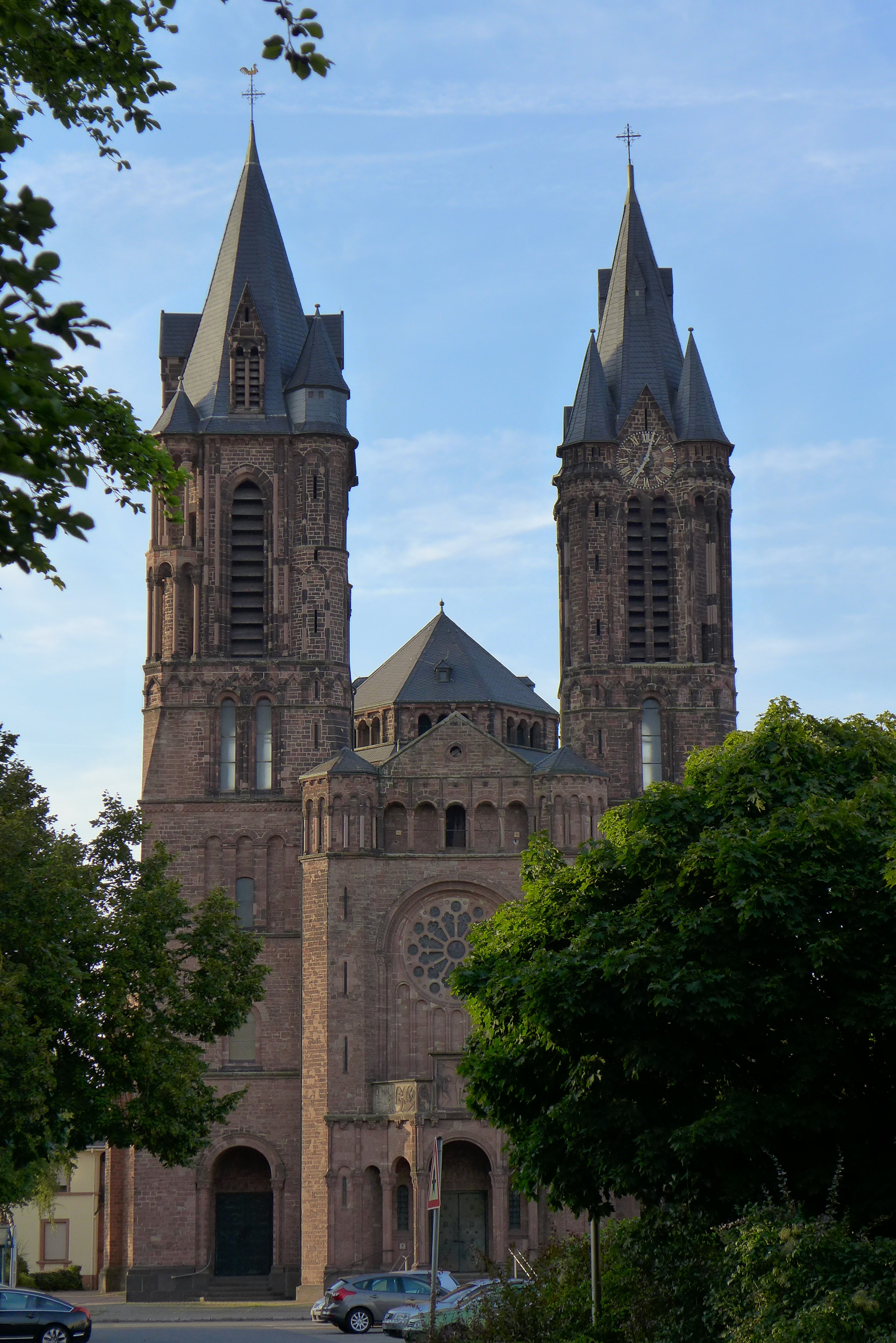
Dillingen/Saar, Saardom

The so-called Saardom (full name: "Ecclesia Parochialis Catholica Sacratissimi Sacramenti Dioecesis Treverensis", "Catholic Parish Church of the Blessed Sacrament in the Diocese of Trier") in Dillingen/Saar is one of the largest sacred buildings in Saarland. It is the parish church of the parish of St Sacrament. The parish belongs to the parish community of the Holy Sacrament, St John the Baptist in Dillingen, St Joseph and St Wendelin in Diefflen, St Maximin in Pachten, and St Mary consolation of the saddeneds (Consolatrix afflictorum) on the Pachtener Heide. The church belongs to the Roman Catholic Diocese of Trier. The feast of dedication is the Solemnity of the Most Holy Body and Blood of Christ.

The church was built between 1910 and 1913 according to plans by the Trier church-architect Peter Marx (1871–1958), mainly in the Neo-Romanesque style. The prototypes of the Saardom include the towers of the Bamberg Cathedral, the towers of the cathedrals of Laon and Naumburg, and the facade of the Cathedral of Metz.

== Dimensions ==
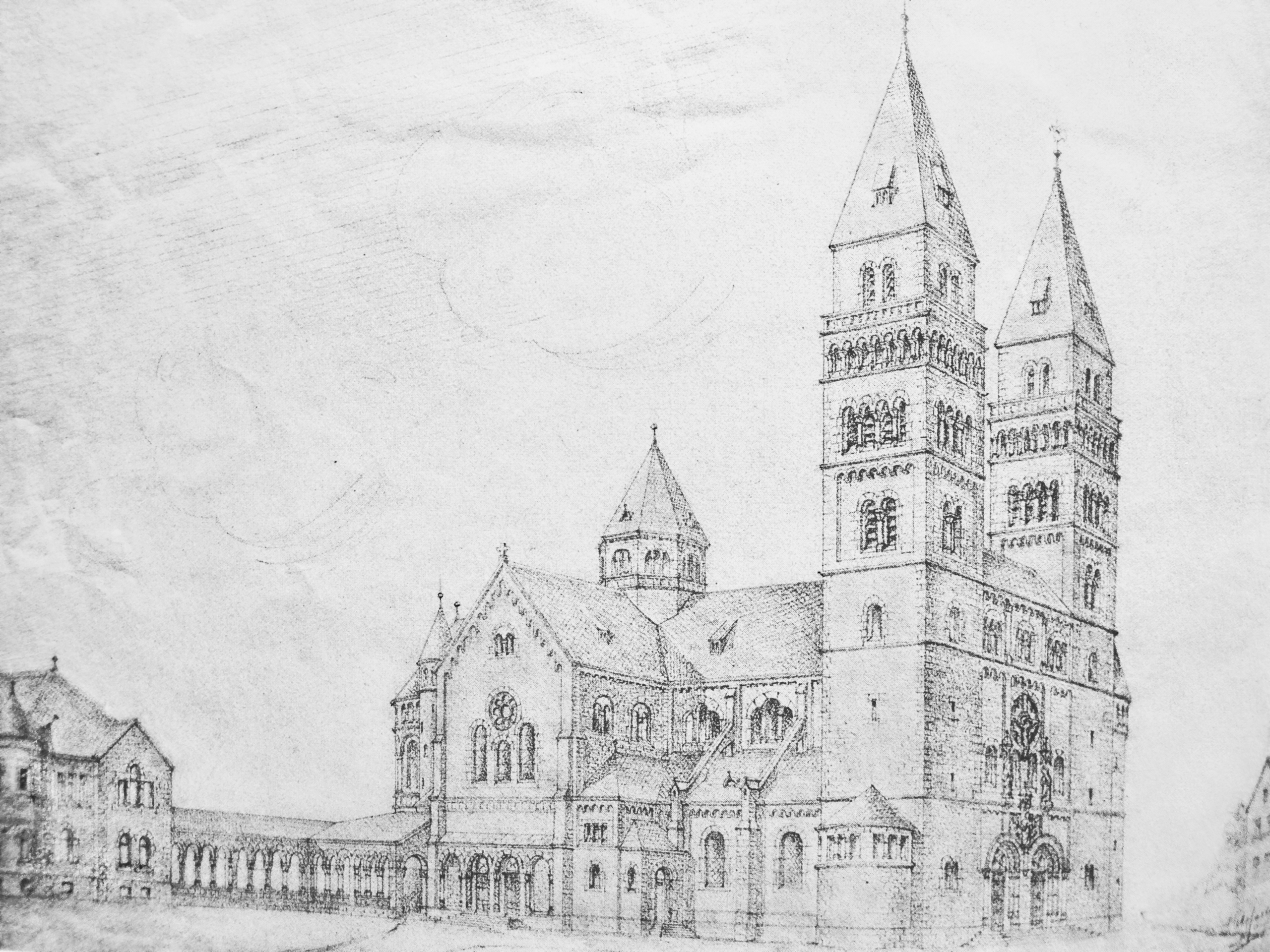
preliminary draft by the architect Wilhelm Hector for the construction of the Saardom from 1906

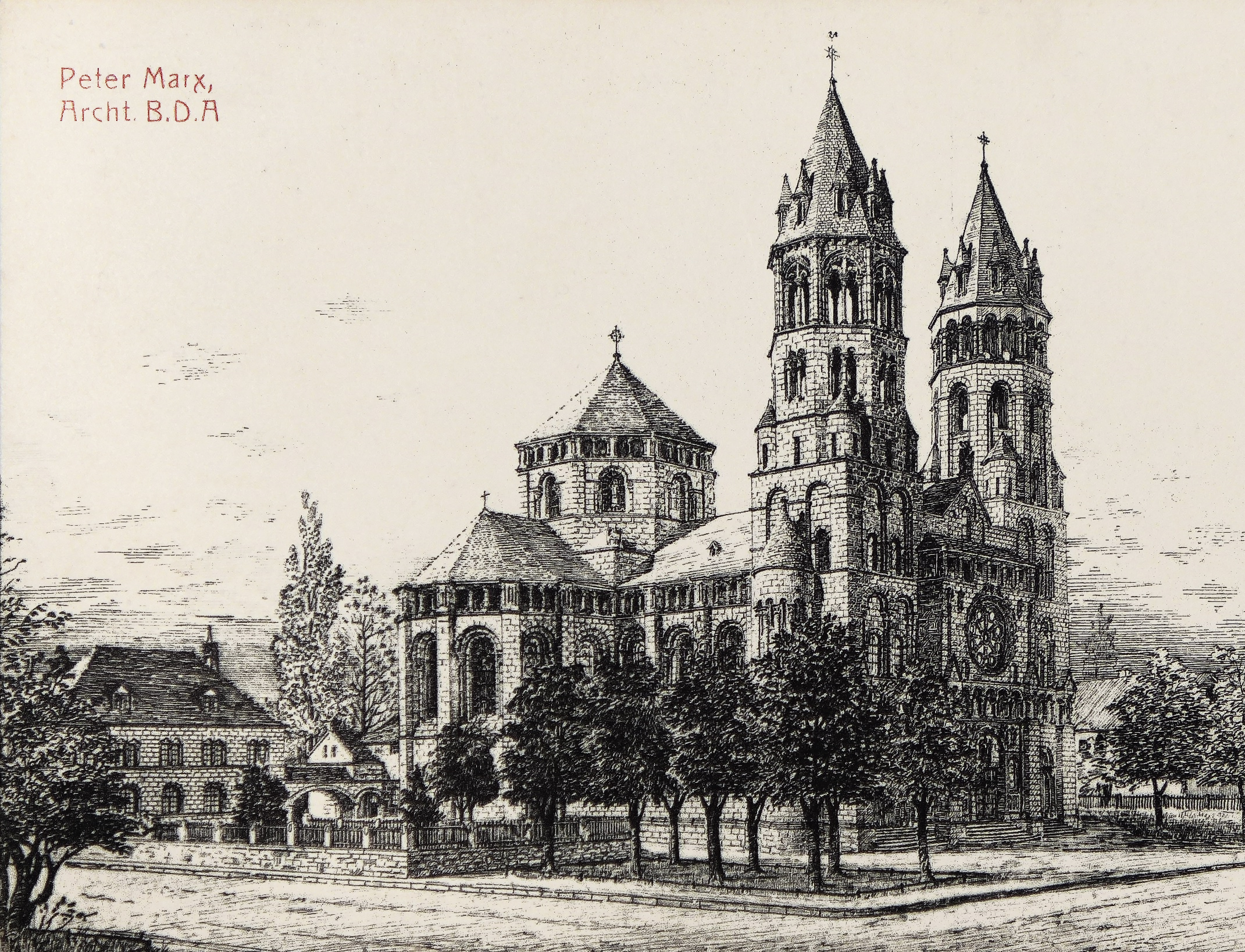
preliminary draft by the architect Peter Marx, 1911

The Saardom has the following dimensions:

- External length (with porch): 62.30 m
- Largest external width in the transept area: 33.50 m
- Outer main-facade width: 23.50 m
- Height of the crossing tower: 33.00 m
- Height of the eastern tower with tower cross: 48,50 m
- Height of the western tower with tower cross: 50.00 m
- Inner width of the central nave: 10 m
- Inner height of aisles: 6 m
- Inner height of the central nave: 15 m
- Inner height of the dome: 27 m
- Inner height of the Lady Chapel and the Christ the King-Chapel: 8 m
- Internal height of the choral passage: 7.40 m
- Intercolumniation of the arcades between middle and aisle: 3.50 m
- Intercolumniation of the apsea arcades: 2 m

Comparing the Saardom with the largest churches in Saarland, the St Michael's Church in Saarbrücken measures 60 m in the outer length and 34.60 m in the largest outer width. The Saardom and the St Michael's Church are in the length surpassed by the neo-Gothic St Josef's Church in Saarbrücken-Malstatt with 68 m outer length.

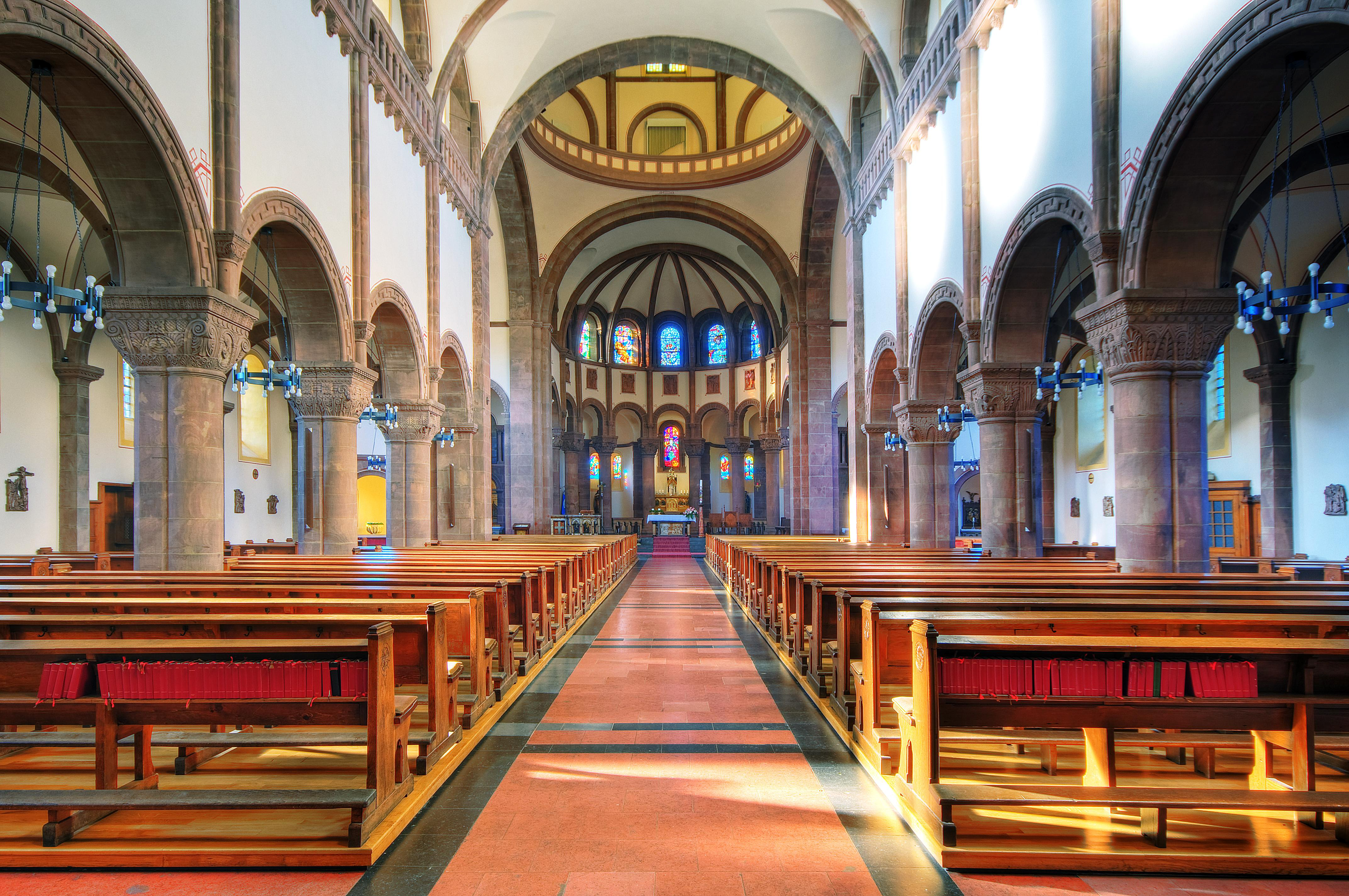
Saardom, interior

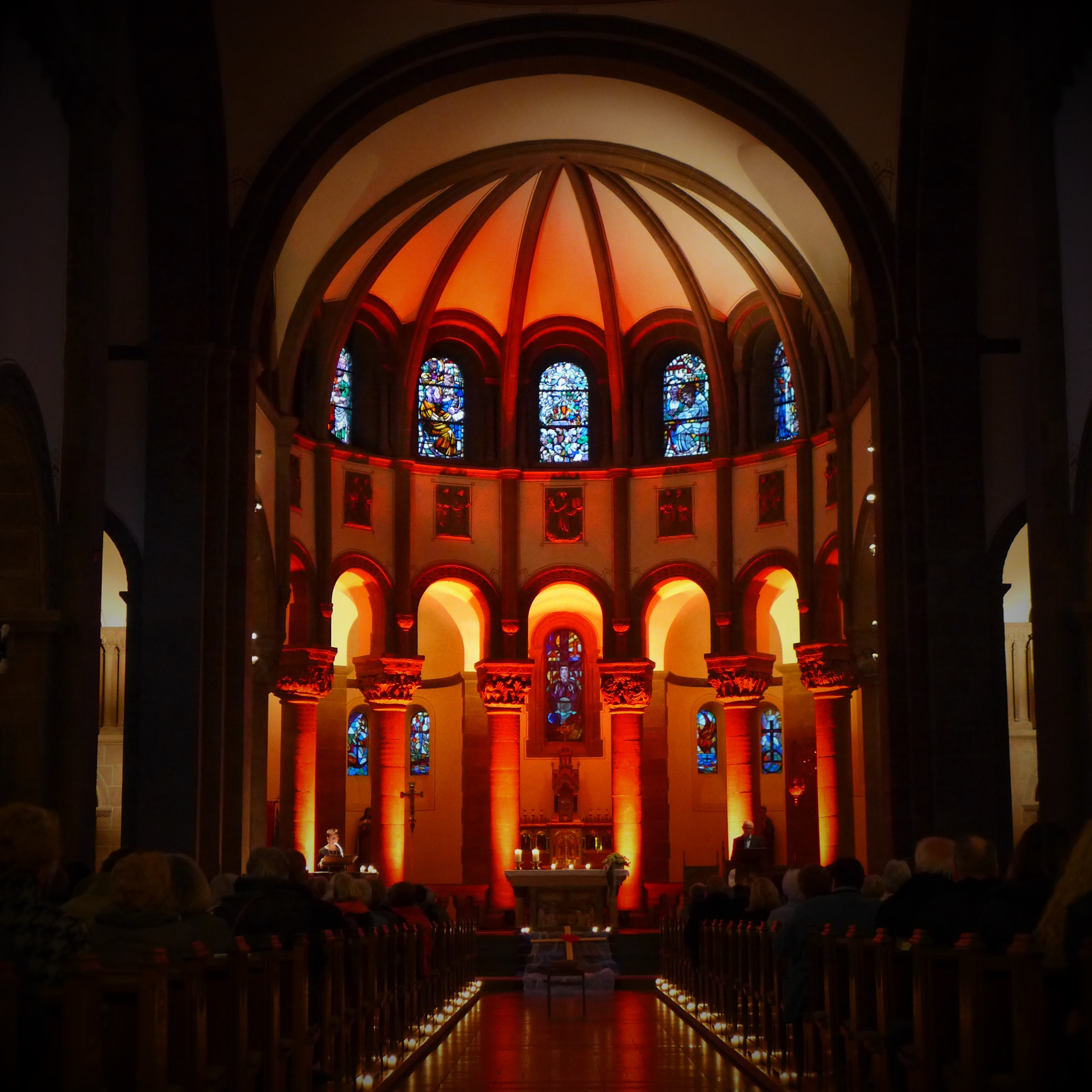
Saardom, apse

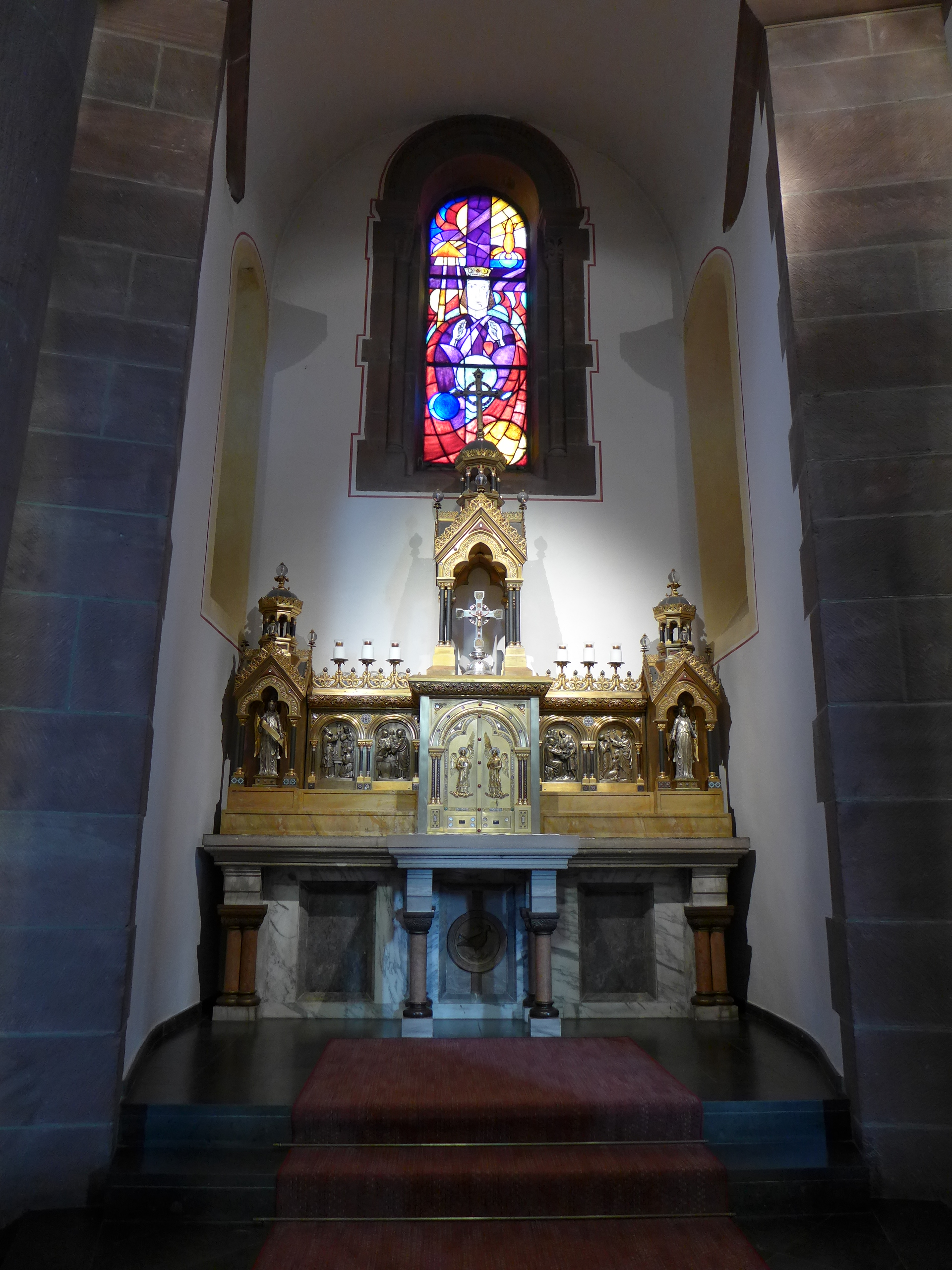
Saardom, high altar in the sacrament chapel

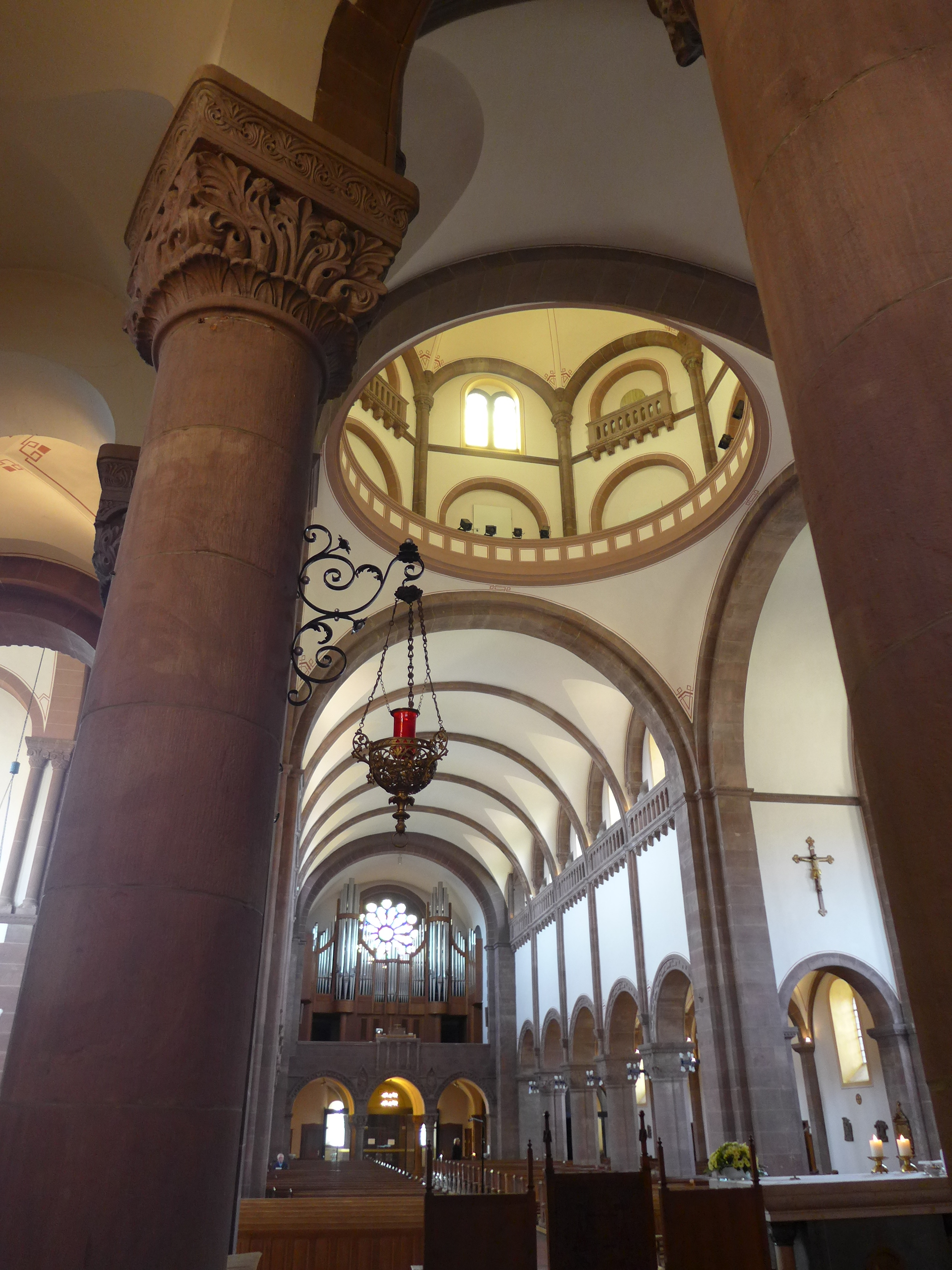
Saardom, view from the ambulatory into the dome

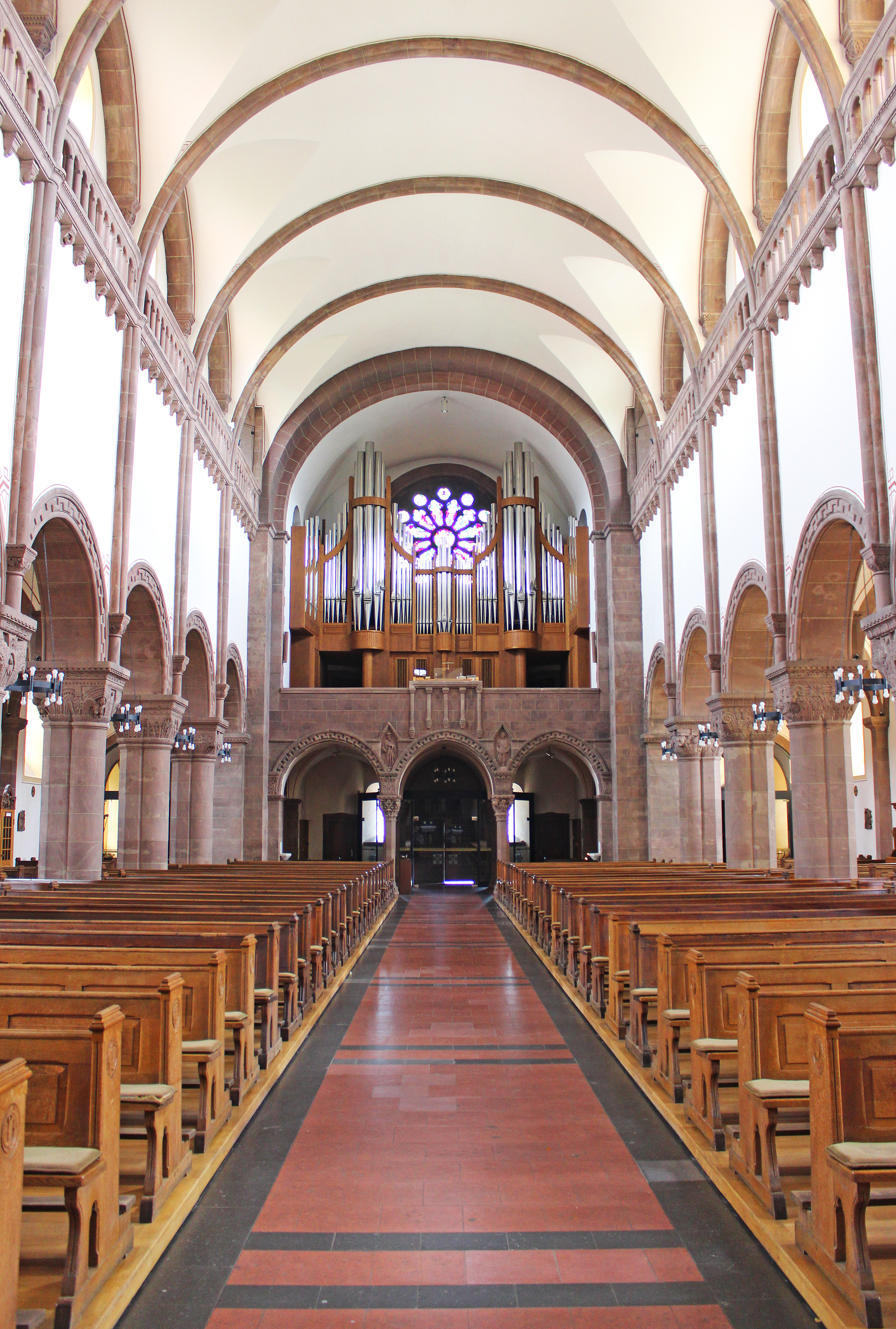
organ gallery

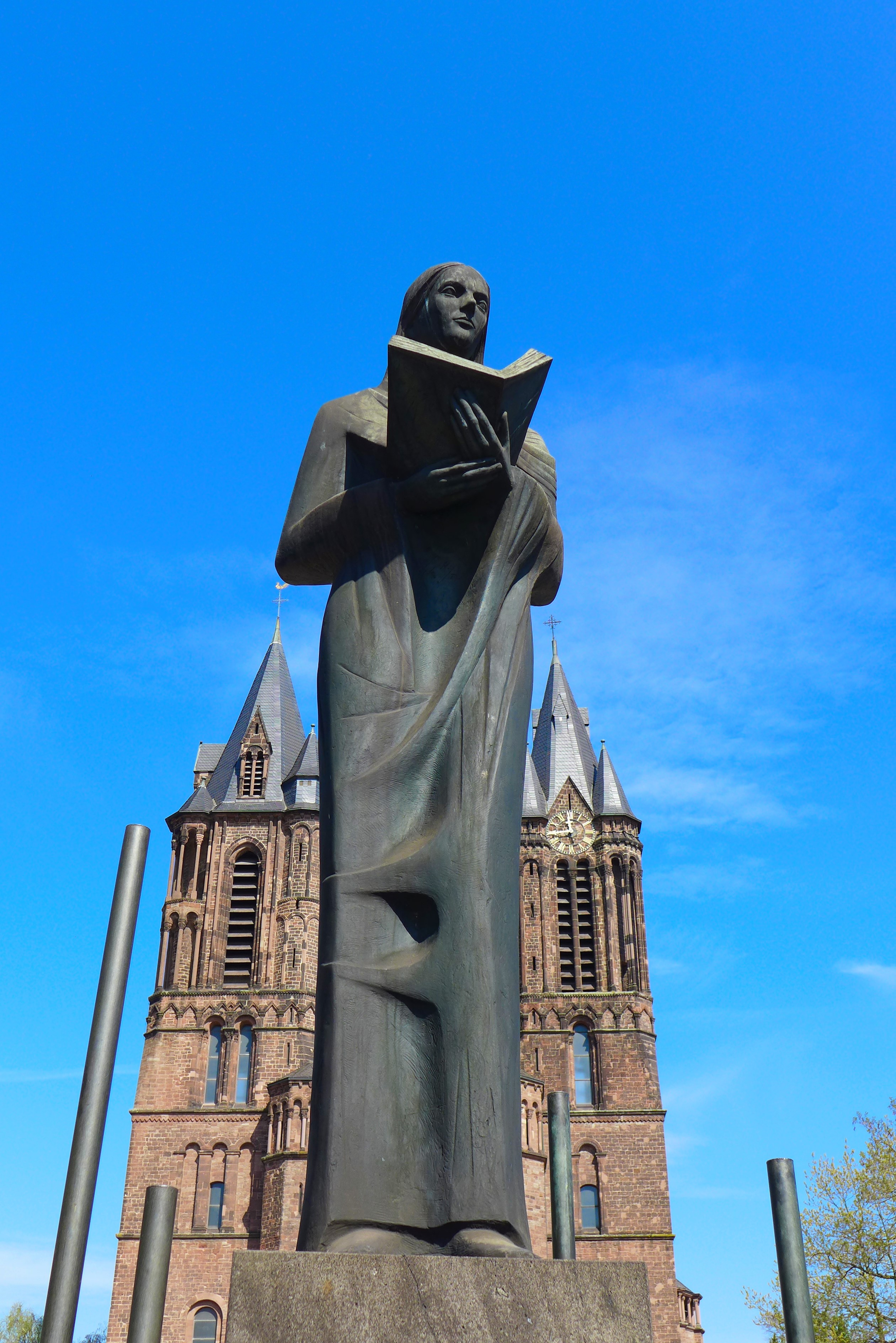
statue of Odile of Alsace in front of Saardom

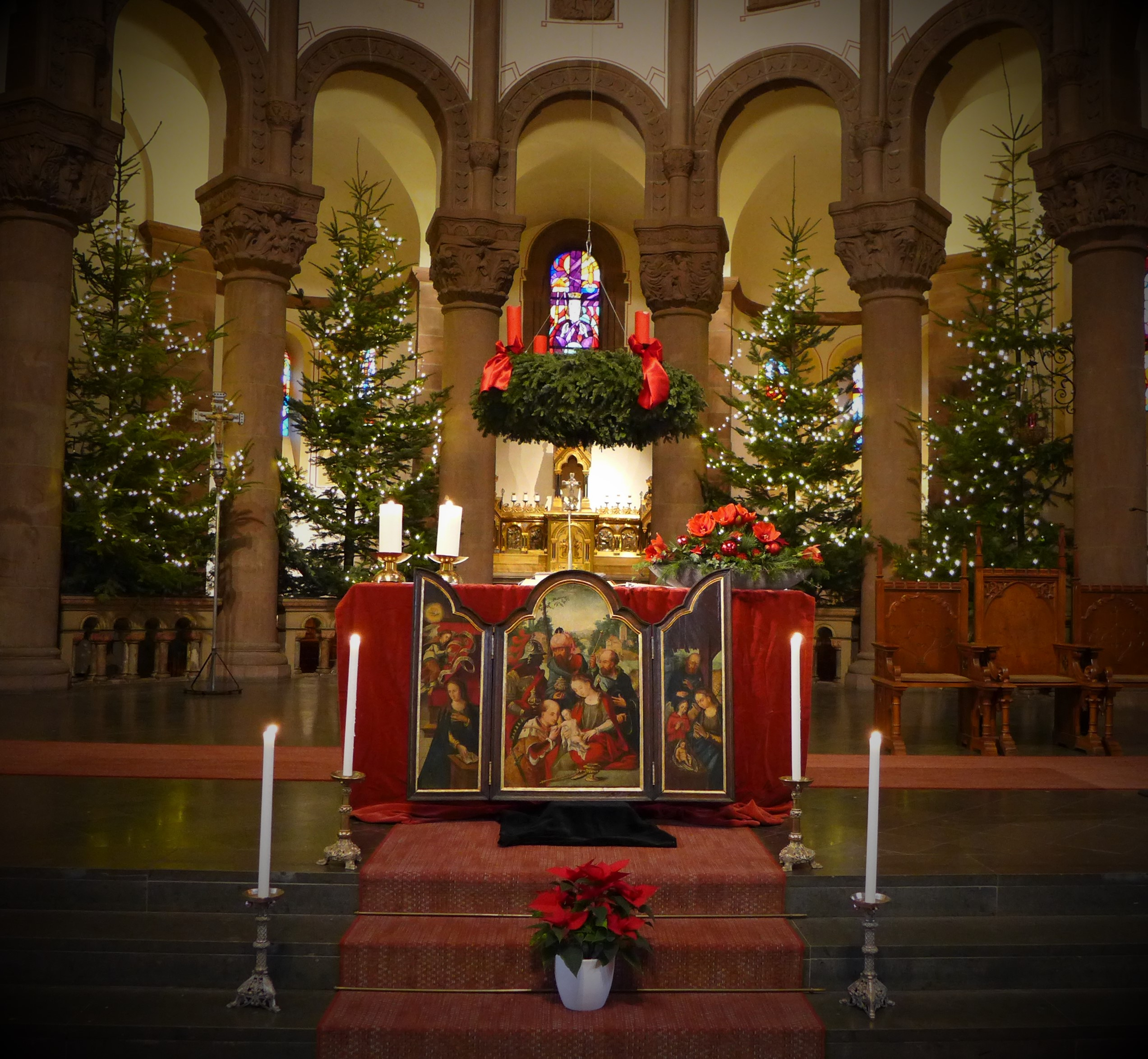
Saardom, Dillinger Triptychon, 16th century

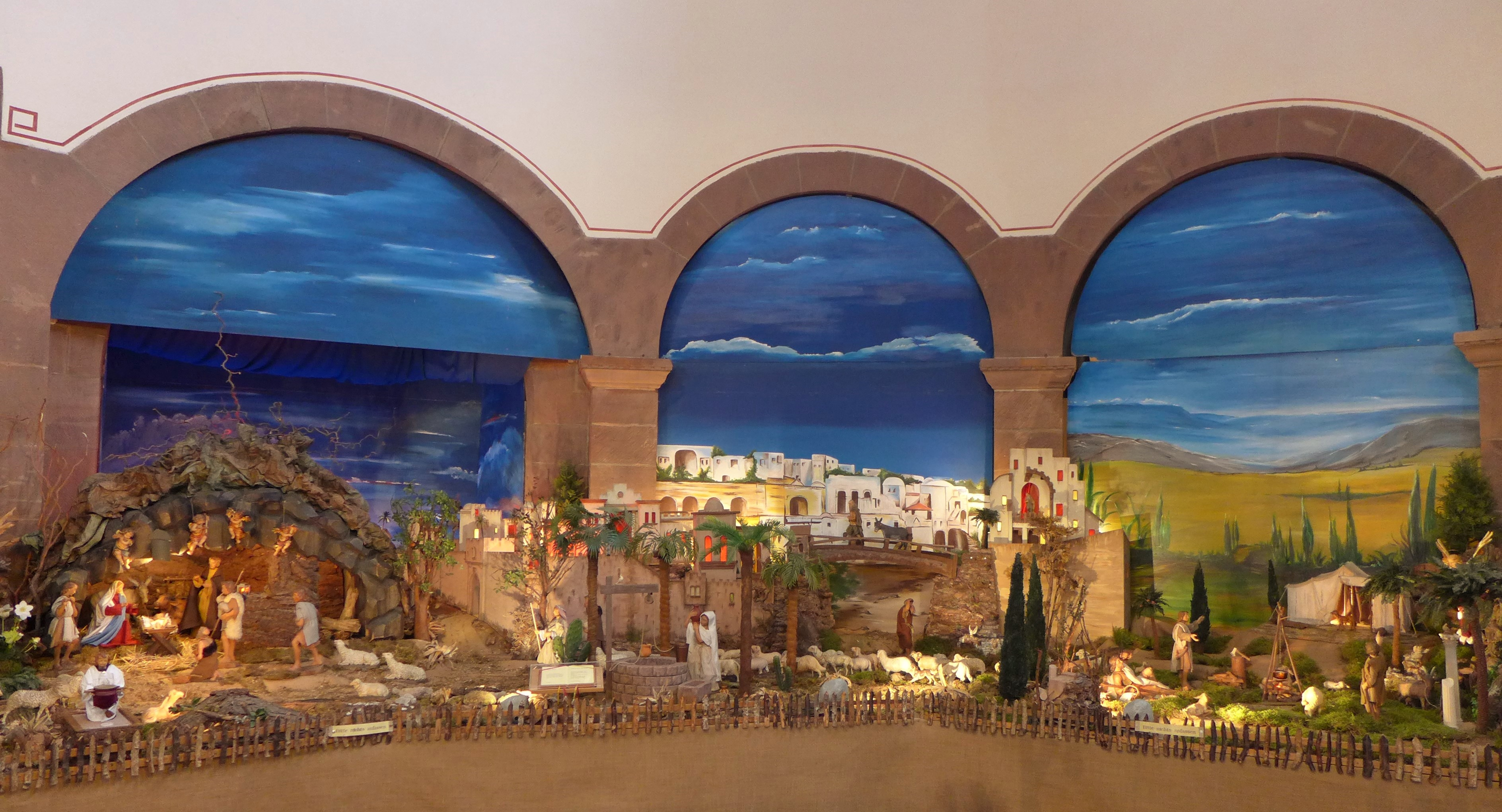
Saardom, nativity scene

== History ==
=== First World War ===
As early as the First World War in 1917, four out of five bronze bells were melted down for armament purposes. Seven years later, in 1924, four cast steel bells were replaced, which still can be heard today.

=== Second World War ===
The explosion of an ammunition train at the Dillingen (Saar) station in 1944 as a consequence of an air raid in World War II caused severe damage. A German tank, which was standing next to the Saardom, attracted American fire, which caused additional damage to the church: Vaults had partially collapsed, stones broken out, windows burst by explosion blasts. Grenades had torn large gaps in the front entrance. The vestibule with the figurine frieze and the crowning crucifixion group, the large rose window and the overlying arcade with the final triangular pediment were shot to pieces.

=== Reconstruction ===
After the end of the fighting in March 1945, they began immediately to clear and repair the damages of Saardom. The end of the restoration of the church was celebrated at Easter 1953.
