= Altes Schloss (Dillingen) =

Coordinates: 49°21′11″N 6°44′01″E

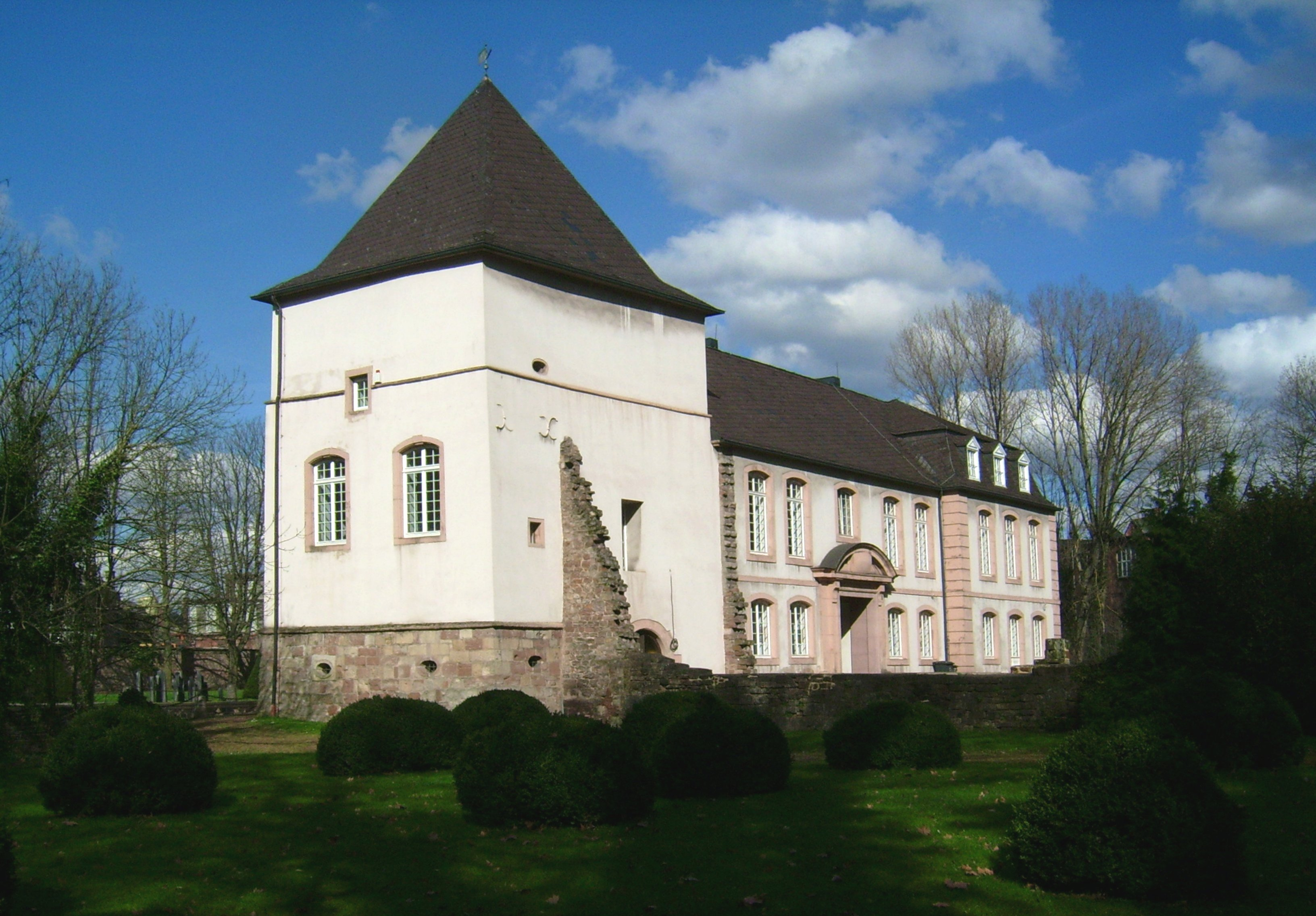
Altes Schloss (Dillingen)

Altes Schloss (Dillingen) is a castle and museum in Dillingen, Saarland, Germany. The Old castle, like many castles, was originally a medieval castle, probably of the 14th century. It is leased to the town, which uses it for cultural purposes, among other things. A sponsoring association has supported the restoration of the castle since 1983.
