= Dillingen, Saarland =

Dillingen
- Town
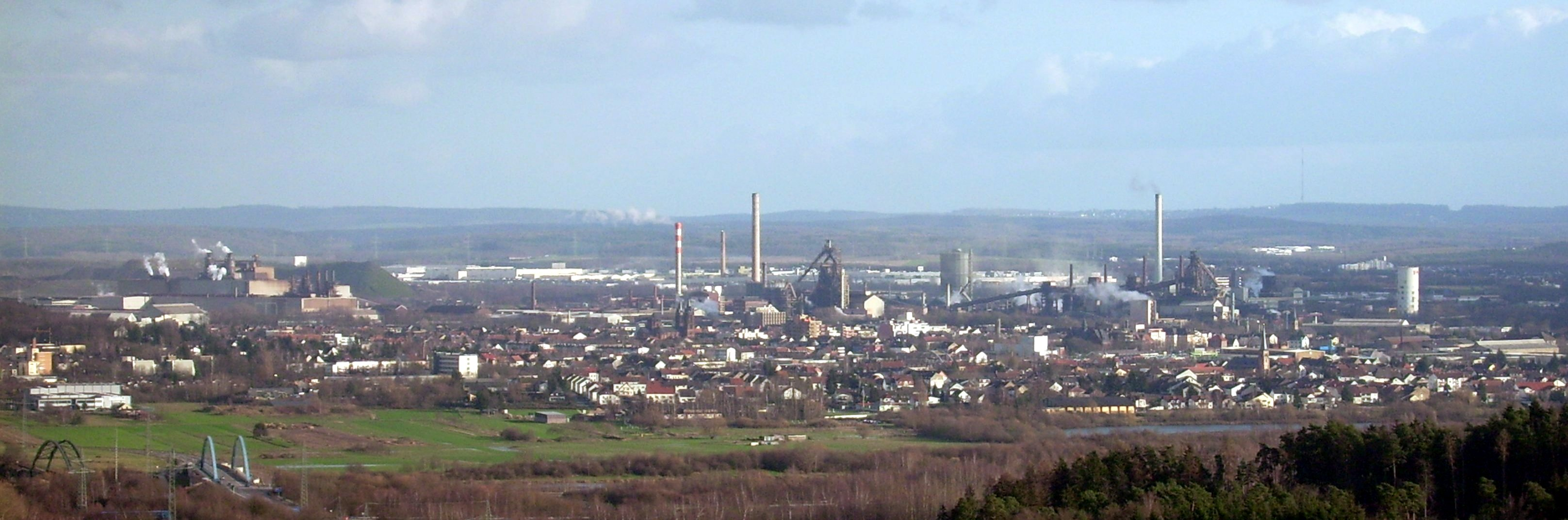

- Flag Coat of arms

- Location of Dillingen within Saarlouis district
- Interactive map of Dillingen
- Location within Germany Location within Saarland
- Coordinates: 49°21′N 6°44′E
- Country: Germany
- State: Saarland
- District: Saarlouis
- Subdivisions: 3

Government
  - Mayor (2024–34): Christian Finkler (CDU)

Area
  - Total: 22.05 km^{2} (8.51 sq mi)
- Elevation: 183 m (600 ft)

Population (2025-12-31)
  - Total: 21,295
  - Density: 965.8/km^{2} (2,501/sq mi)
- Time zone: UTC+01:00 (CET)
  - Summer (DST): UTC+02:00 (CEST)
- Postal codes: 66744–66763
- Dialling codes: 06831
- Vehicle registration: SLS
- Website: www.dillingen-saar.de

Dillingen (German pronunciation: [ˈdɪlɪŋən]; officially Dillingen/Saar; French: Dillange) is a town in the district of Saarlouis, in Saarland. It has about 20,000 inhabitants and is divided into three districts: Dillingen city centre, Pachten and Diefflen. The city is located on the edge of the Saar-Hunsrück Nature Park at the mouth of the Prims in the Saar and is located about 10 km from the French border. Dillingen is located about 60 km from Luxembourg City and Trier, 50 km from Metz and 30 km from Saarbrücken and is directly adjacent to the urban area of Saarlouis. In terms of population, it is the second-largest municipality in the district of Saarlouis. The Dillinger Hütte steelworks is located here.

== Geography ==
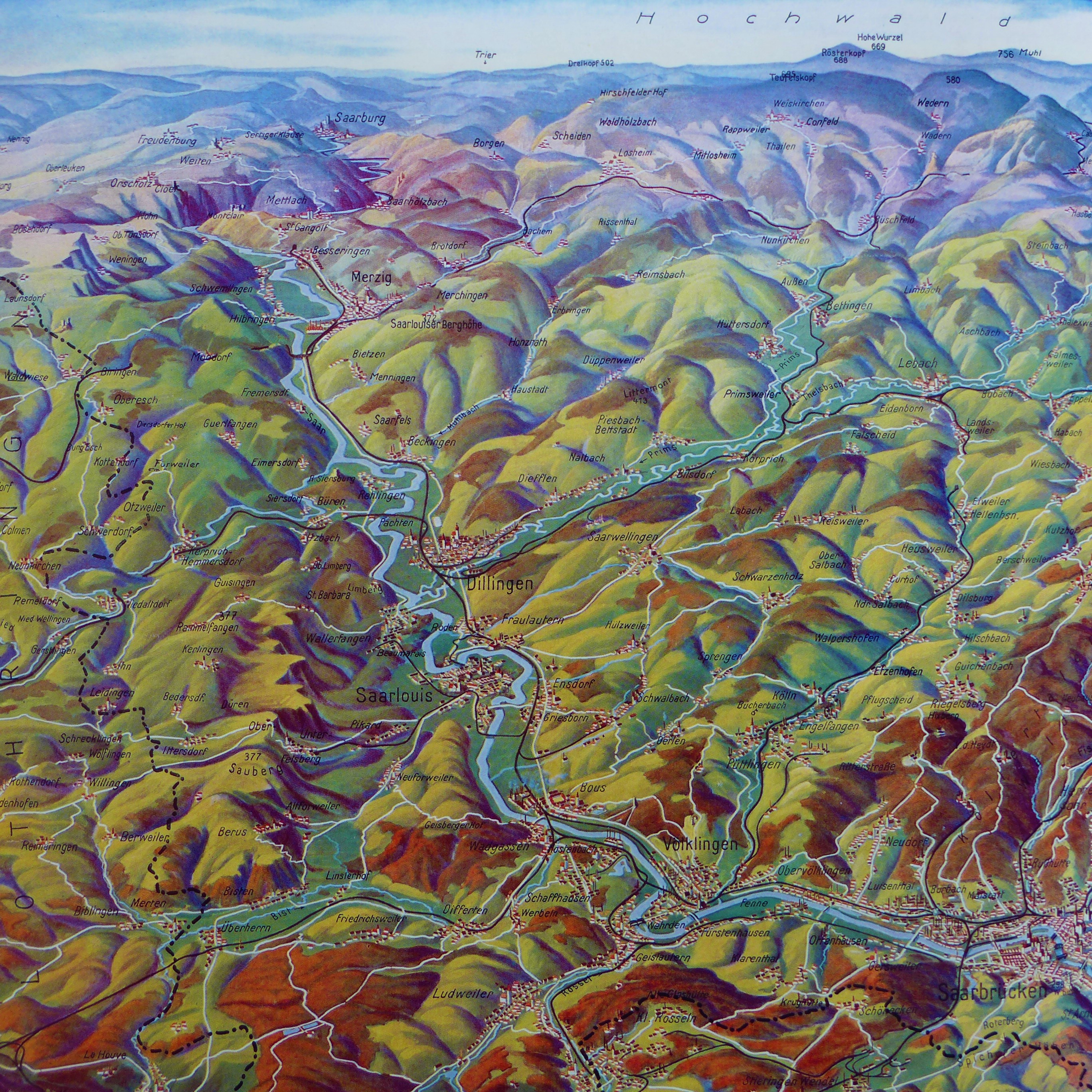
Panoramic map of the surroundings of Dillingen

=== Geographical location ===
Dillingen lies to the right of the Saar in the northern part of the Basin of Saarlouis and thus in the Saar-Nahe Basin. The Basin of Saarlouis is bounded on the northwest, north and northeast by the heights of the Buntsandstein. They belong to the eastern edge of the Paris Basin and lead into the basin of the Prims. The Prims coming from the Schwarzwälder Hochwald and emanates above the district of Pachten in the Saar. A few kilometers north of the territorial entity of Pachten the Saar unites with the Nied coming from Lorraine. The alluvial deposits in the basin allow good agricultural use.

=== Geology ===
==== Large-scale overview ====
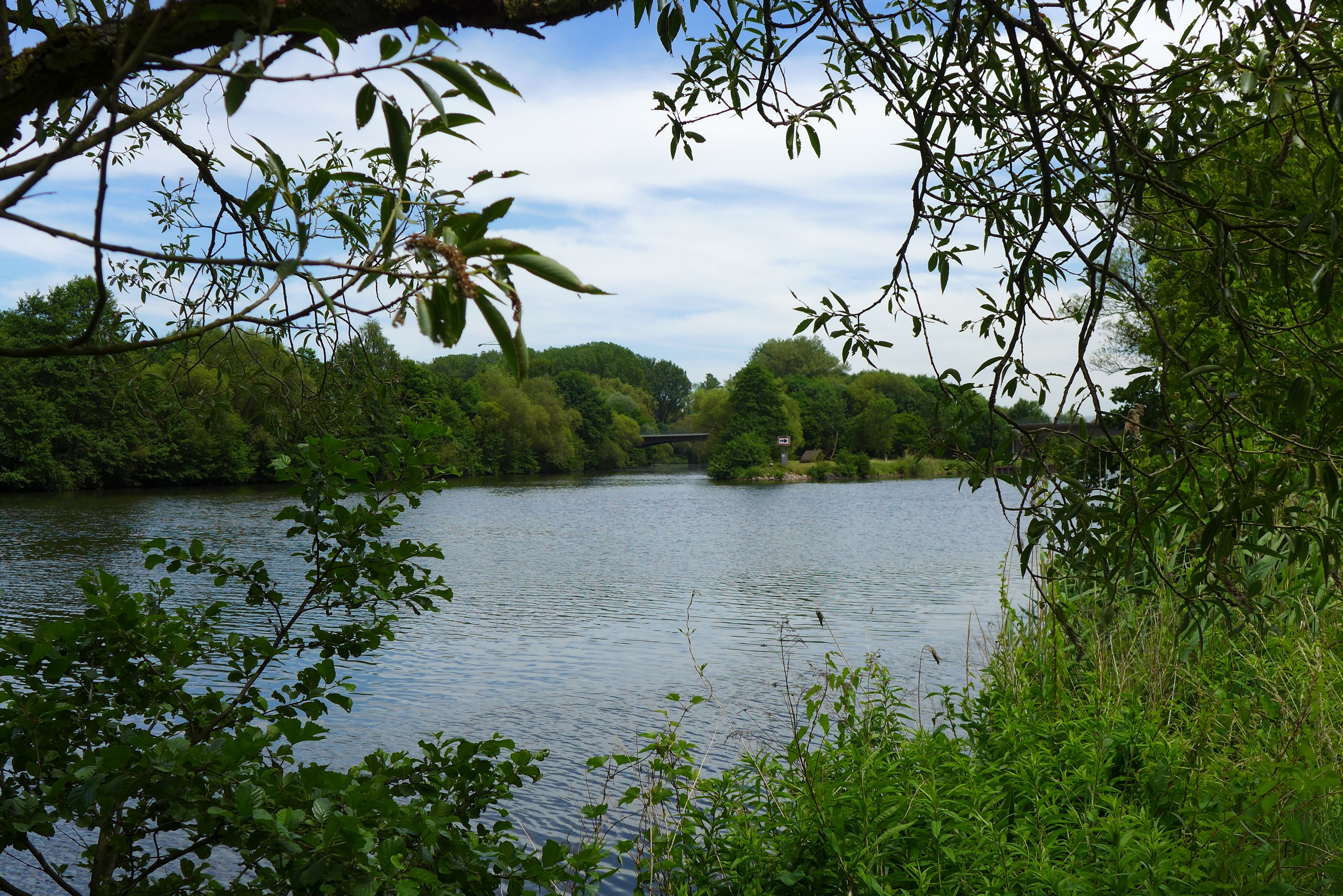
Mouth of the Prims (left) into the Saar (right)

The rock strata of the coal-saddle of Saarbrücken (Carboniferous) dive to the northwest and it comes to a superposition of younger rocks of the Rotliegend and the Triassic. Dillingen lies on a plaice of the middle Buntsandstein. The rectangular plaice is stretched towards southeast-northwest and bounded to the south by the Carboniferous line of the municipalities of Ensdorf, Hülzweiler and Schwarzenholz. In the southwest and northwest of this plaice of Buntsandstein lie the ridges of the upper Buntsandstein (Röt Formation) and the Muschelkalk between Berus, Siersburg and the valley of Haustadt. The rocks of the lower Rotliegend and the carbon form the northeastern border area.

==== Narrower room ====
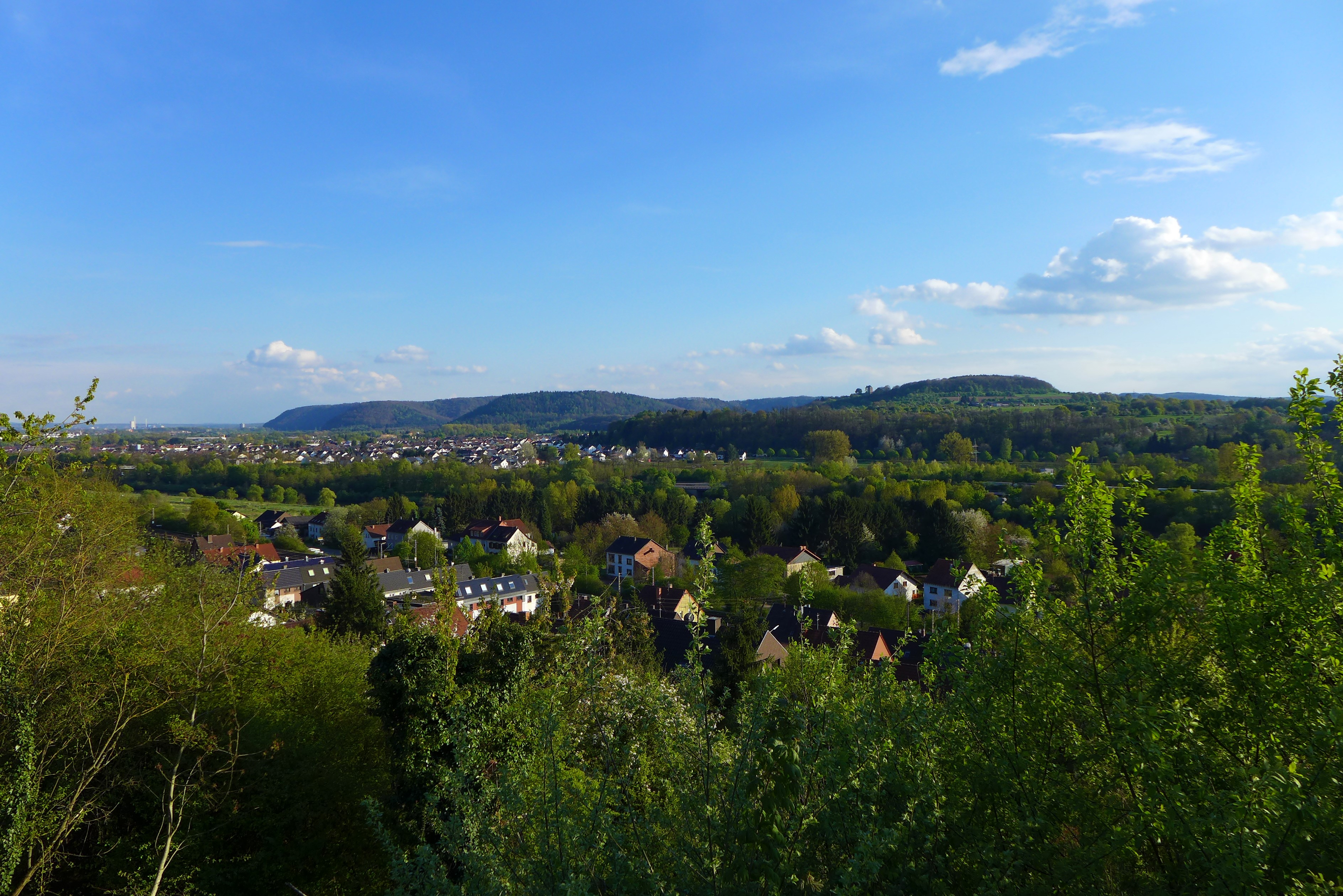
View of the Limberg-massif from Saarfels

The extended valley of the area Dillingen and Saarlouis lies in the area of the middle Buntsandstein, in which the valleys of the Saar and the Prims dug. The left flank of the Saar at Dillingen, the Limberg, is formed by a steep of Grès à Voltzia, while a right flank of the valley is missing. On this bas-relief with overlaying younger gravel blankets, the development area of Dillingen and Pachten spreads.

In the middle Buntsandstein mainly crumbly, easily erodible sandstone formations are developed. Above is the upper Buntsandstein (Röt Formation), which is made up of firmer sandstones bound to parts of clay or carbonate. These were won in earlier times in numerous quarries as building material. Above are Muschelkalk-Layers: The lowest shell limestone layer form sandy-clayey-limestone rocks. The middle limestone layer contains marl with gypsum and anhydrite. The upper shell limestone layer is composed of massive limestones and platy limestones with layers of marl-layers.

Above these solid subsoil rocks, sediment-terraces of the rivers Saar and Prims are deposited. The different altitudes of these terraces bear testimony to different stages of the depression of the two rivers and the deposit of entrained crushed stones. The youngest deposits form the meadow-clay of the two river valleys.

=== Morphology ===
In the territory of Dillingen is the confluence of the two river valleys of Saar and Prims. The Prims finish their 91 kilometer run here. The terrain height at the mouth is 177 m above sea level. East of the Saar occurs on both banks of Prims the middle Buntsandstein. It is widely worn and forms a flat wavy stepped landscape. The areas are covered by broad terraced fields of gravel and clay.

=== Mineralogy ===
Almost all rocks occurring in the Dillingen area can be used economically. The friable rocks of the middle Buntsandstein were mined as sand in pits or slope edges. The firmer sandstones of the upper Buntsandstein (Röt Formation) provided breakage and quarry stones. Gravel was extracted from the terraces. Loam was used as brick material.

=== Climate ===
The climate in Dillingen is moderately oceanic, but warm (Köppen: Cfb; Trewartha: Dobk). There is significant rainfall throughout the year. Even the driest month still shows high rainfall. The average annual temperature is 9.3 °C (48.7 °F).

The Kiel weather station has recorded the following extreme values:

- Highest temperature 37.5 °C (99.5 °F) on 13 August 2003.
- Warmest minimum 20.8 °C (69.4 °F) on 19 July 1976.
- Coldest maximum −17.9 °C (−0.2 °F) on 7 January 1985.
- Lowest temperature −27.2 °C (−17.0 °F) on 7 January 1985.
- Highest daily precipitation 99.6 mm (3.92 in) on 6 June 2021.
- Wettest month 219.6 mm (8.65 in) in June 2021.
- Wettest year 1,095.1 mm (43.11 in) in 2002.
- Driest year 463.2 mm (18.24 in) in 1972.
- Earliest snowfall: 27 October 1950.
- Latest snowfall: 30 April 1970.
- Longest annual sunshine: 2,185.7 hours in 2022.
- Shortest annual sunshine: 1,477.8 hours in 2013.

Climate data for Dillingen, 1991–2020 normals, extremes 1947–present (Note: Temperature data for Dillingen have been recorded since 1947. The weather station data used from 1 May 1947 to 30 November 2006 came from Dillingen/Donau, and temperature data from 1 December 2006 to the present are from Dillingen/Donau-Fristingen.)
Month	Jan	Feb	Mar	Apr	May	Jun	Jul	Aug	Sep	Oct	Nov	Dec	Year
Record high °C (°F)	16.5 (61.7)	19.8 (67.6)	23.9 (75.0)	30.5 (86.9)	32.0 (89.6)	36.0 (96.8)	37.0 (98.6)	37.5 (99.5)	32.0 (89.6)	27.0 (80.6)	20.5 (68.9)	16.0 (60.8)	37.5 (99.5)
Mean maximum °C (°F)	10.6 (51.1)	13.1 (55.6)	18.7 (65.7)	24.2 (75.6)	28.2 (82.8)	31.4 (88.5)	33.0 (91.4)	32.4 (90.3)	27.3 (81.1)	22.1 (71.8)	15.2 (59.4)	11.4 (52.5)	34.1 (93.4)
Mean daily maximum °C (°F)	2.8 (37.0)	4.9 (40.8)	10.0 (50.0)	15.3 (59.5)	19.6 (67.3)	23.1 (73.6)	25.1 (77.2)	24.9 (76.8)	19.6 (67.3)	13.6 (56.5)	7.0 (44.6)	3.5 (38.3)	14.1 (57.4)
Daily mean °C (°F)	0.2 (32.4)	1.0 (33.8)	4.9 (40.8)	9.4 (48.9)	13.8 (56.8)	17.4 (63.3)	18.9 (66.0)	18.4 (65.1)	13.7 (56.7)	9.1 (48.4)	4.2 (39.6)	1.0 (33.8)	9.3 (48.7)
Mean daily minimum °C (°F)	−2.6 (27.3)	−2.6 (27.3)	0.4 (32.7)	3.6 (38.5)	8.0 (46.4)	11.4 (52.5)	13.0 (55.4)	12.7 (54.9)	8.8 (47.8)	5.3 (41.5)	1.5 (34.7)	−1.5 (29.3)	4.8 (40.6)
Mean minimum °C (°F)	−11.2 (11.8)	−10.5 (13.1)	−6.0 (21.2)	−2.6 (27.3)	1.9 (35.4)	5.8 (42.4)	8.1 (46.6)	7.2 (45.0)	3.0 (37.4)	−1.0 (30.2)	−4.9 (23.2)	−10.1 (13.8)	−14.5 (5.9)
Record low °C (°F)	−27.2 (−17.0)	−27.0 (−16.6)	−21.8 (−7.2)	−6.3 (20.7)	−3.3 (26.1)	0.0 (32.0)	4.2 (39.6)	2.6 (36.7)	−2.4 (27.7)	−7.5 (18.5)	−15.6 (3.9)	−22.0 (−7.6)	−27.2 (−17.0)
Average precipitation mm (inches)	49.3 (1.94)	37.8 (1.49)	49.2 (1.94)	46.2 (1.82)	80.7 (3.18)	82.5 (3.25)	89.7 (3.53)	83.0 (3.27)	58.2 (2.29)	55.3 (2.18)	54.0 (2.13)	56.2 (2.21)	741.9 (29.21)
Average extreme snow depth cm (inches)	6.0 (2.4)	6.0 (2.4)	3.7 (1.5)	0.1 (0.0)	0 (0)	0 (0)	0 (0)	0 (0)	0 (0)	0.1 (0.0)	1.6 (0.6)	5.4 (2.1)	11.2 (4.4)
Average precipitation days (≥ 0.1 mm)	15.5	14.0	14.6	12.7	14.5	15.0	14.8	13.8	12.9	15.2	15.5	16.7	175.2
Average relative humidity (%)	84.9	81.7	76.3	69.9	70.7	71.1	71.7	74.4	80.4	85.6	88.3	87.3	78.6
Mean monthly sunshine hours	51.4	87.1	152.4	202.2	214.7	232.3	256.5	232.4	162.9	99.8	50.9	44.6	1,787.3
Source: DWD Open Data

=== Neighboring communities ===
The city of Dillingen has six neighboring municipalities. In clockwise order, they are Beckingen, Nalbach with the districts of Bierbach and Nalbach, Saarwellingen, Saarlouis (with the district of Roden), Wallerfangen and Rehlingen-Siersburg.

== History ==
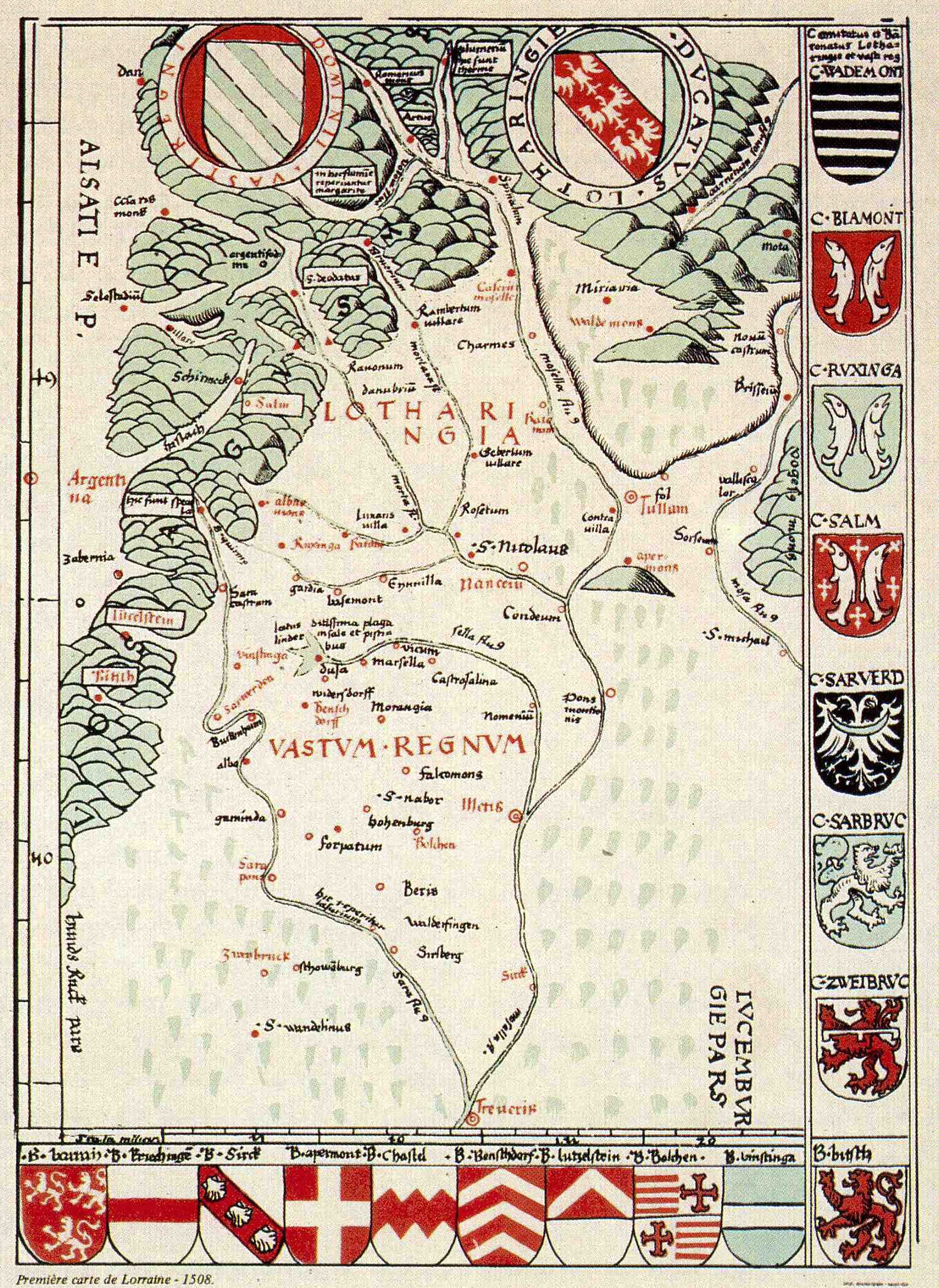
Office Siersberg-Dillingen in the oldest Lorraine map of 1508

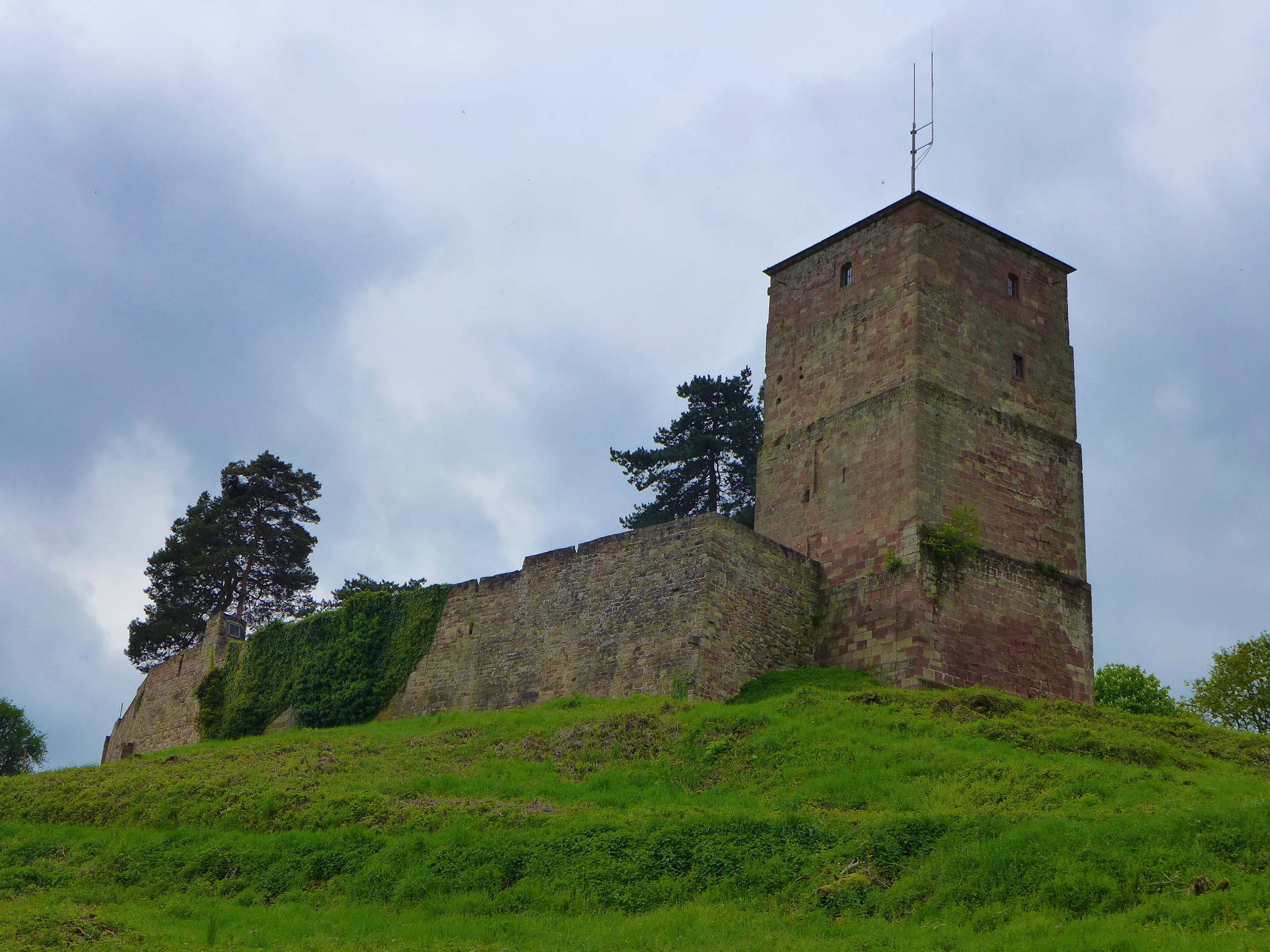
Ruin of the Lorraine castle Siersberg with donjon

The importance of the Dillingen-Wallerfangen area on both banks of the middle Saar in the prehistoric and early historic eras is attested by a number of finds: rich bronze caskets of the late Urnfield period (9th century BC), a multi-tiered partial defensive wall (de:Abschnittsbefestigung) of the Hallstatt culture (8th-6th century BC) on the nearly 389 metres (1,276 ft)-high, peninsula-like massif of the Limberg overlooking the Saar, and a cemetery with a "princely" grave containing a golden torc and arm rings from late Hallstatt period (around 500 BC).

The Gallo-Roman settlement of Contiomagus stood at the intersection of the highways from Metz-Mainz and Trier-Straßburg in today's district of Pachten. Around 275/276, during the Migration Period, Contiomagus was destroyed and rebuilt. The oldest written mention of "Dillingen" and "Pachten" can be found in a document of Albero von Montreuil, Bishop of Trier (1131–1152). 1324 sees the first written mention of "Diefflen", and 1357 the first mention of the Old Castle in Dillingen (Altes Schloss).

The area was devastated by the Thirty Years War between 1618 and 1648, and again in 1672-1678/79 in the Franco-Dutch War. In 1685, the feudal ruler of Dillingen received permission from King Louis XIV of France to build an ironworks, the Dillinger Hütte.

The French Revolution ended the rule of the local nobility. In 1815, the region was annexed to the Kingdom of Prussia in the Second Treaty of Paris. With the fall of the Hohenzollern dynasty in 1918 Dillingen became part of the Free State of Prussia. Between 1920 and the Saar Referendum of 1935, by the provisions of the Treaty of Versailles, Dillingen was part of the Territory of the Saar Basin administered by the League of Nations. After the referendum of 1935 Dillingen returned to the German Reich, but without again becoming part of Prussia. In 1936 Pachten was incorporated. During the Second World War, especially during the fierce fighting in the winter of 1944/1945, war between the German Wehrmacht and the United States Army caused heavy destruction, commemorated by the Westwall Bunker Museum. In 1947 Dillingen became part of the Saarland, which, in 1957, joined the Federal Republic of Germany politically and on 5 July 1959 also economically. In 1949, Dillingen was granted city rights by the Saar state government under Prime Minister Johannes Hoffmann. In 1969 Diefflen was incorporated in 1969.

In the year 1990 Dillingen-Pachten celebrated two thousand years of settlement in Contiomagus.

Dillingen is the place of origin for the toponymic surname Dillinger.

== Mayors ==
- April 1945-May 1945: Benedikt Hoffmann
- May 1945-September 1945: Heinrich Scherer
- November 1945-September 1946: Theodor Okon
- October 1946-May 1956: Peter Lamar
- October 1956-February 1974: Eduard Jakobs, CDU
- March 1974-March 1994: Gerhard Leonardy, CDU
- March 1994-March 2004: Erwin Planta, SPD
- since March 2004: Franz-Josef Berg (born 1957), CDU

=== Municipal Council ===
The City Council with 39 seats after local elections on 25 May 2014

- Persons entitled to vote: 16,357
- Voters: 7,364
- Rejected votes: 204
- Valid votes: 7,160

Party	Votes	in %	city council seat
CDU	3,131	43.7 %	18
SPD	2,344	32.7 %	13
Linke	751	10.5 %	4
Grüne	283	4.0 %	1
FDP	211	2.9 %	1
Ökologische Bürgerliste Dillingen	440	6.1 %	2
Total			39

== Coat of arms of Dillingen ==
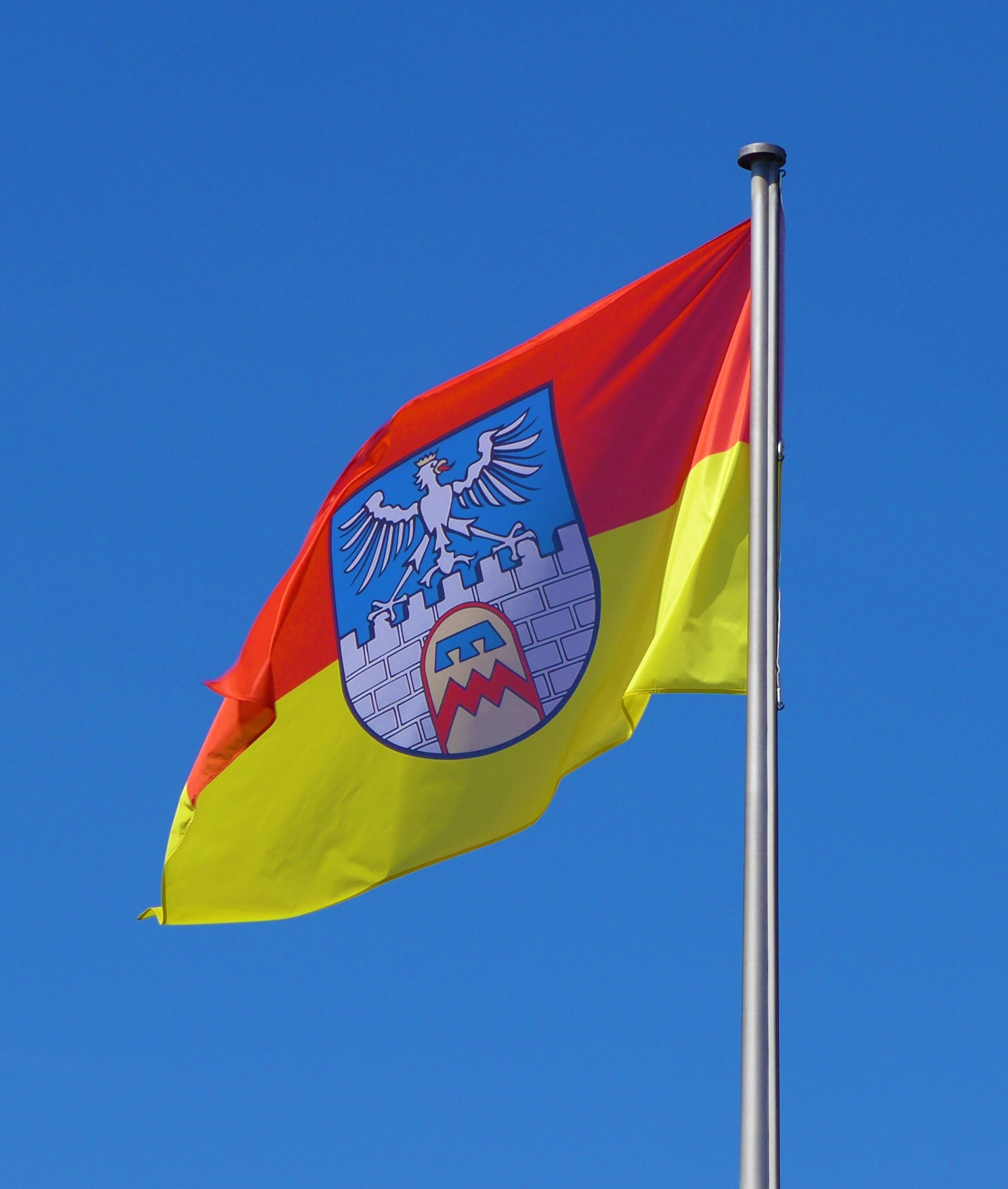
City flag of Dillingen in the Lorraine colors red and yellow

Blazon: In blue a growing silver, pinned and black grooved wall, surmounted by a silver, gold-crowned and -supported and red-tongued seated Lorraine eagle, in the wall a tall, red-lined golden gate, covered with a red zigzag bar, surmounted by a three-rowed, blue tournament collar. The coat of arms is based in its design on the coat of arms of the noblemen of Siersberg, barons of Dillingen (red zigzag beam and blue tournament collar on gold background) and the official coat of arms of the former Prévôté (Bailiwick) Siersberg (silver tower with eagle on a blue background). The coat of arms of the noblemen is reinterpreted in the coat of arms of Dillingen to the gate in a city wall.

== Transport ==
Dillingen (Saar) station is on the Saar Railway, which connects Saarbrücken Central Station and Trier Central Station.

Iron ore is brought to the steelworks by Germany's heaviest trains, the 6000T.

== Castle ==
Dilingen's Old Castle is a medieval building. Around 1699 it was developed into a Renaissance castle. In 1789 the architect Balthsar Wilhelm Stengel created a grand residential space.

The castle has a yearly arts and crafts market.

== Notable people ==
- Siegfried Alkan (1858–1941), composer
- Andreas Rothkopf (born 1955), organist, pianist
Impressions of Dillingen

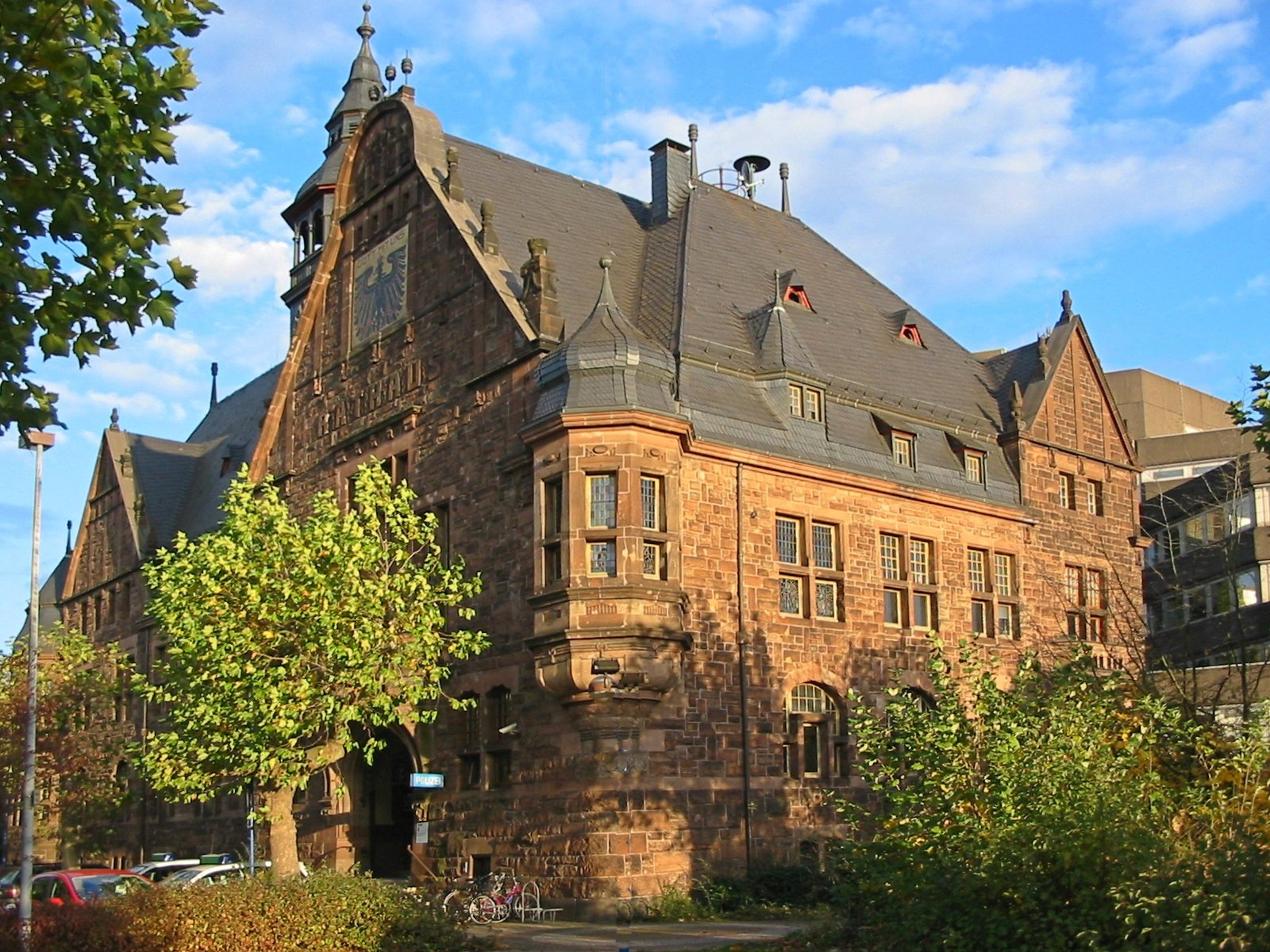
Town Hall

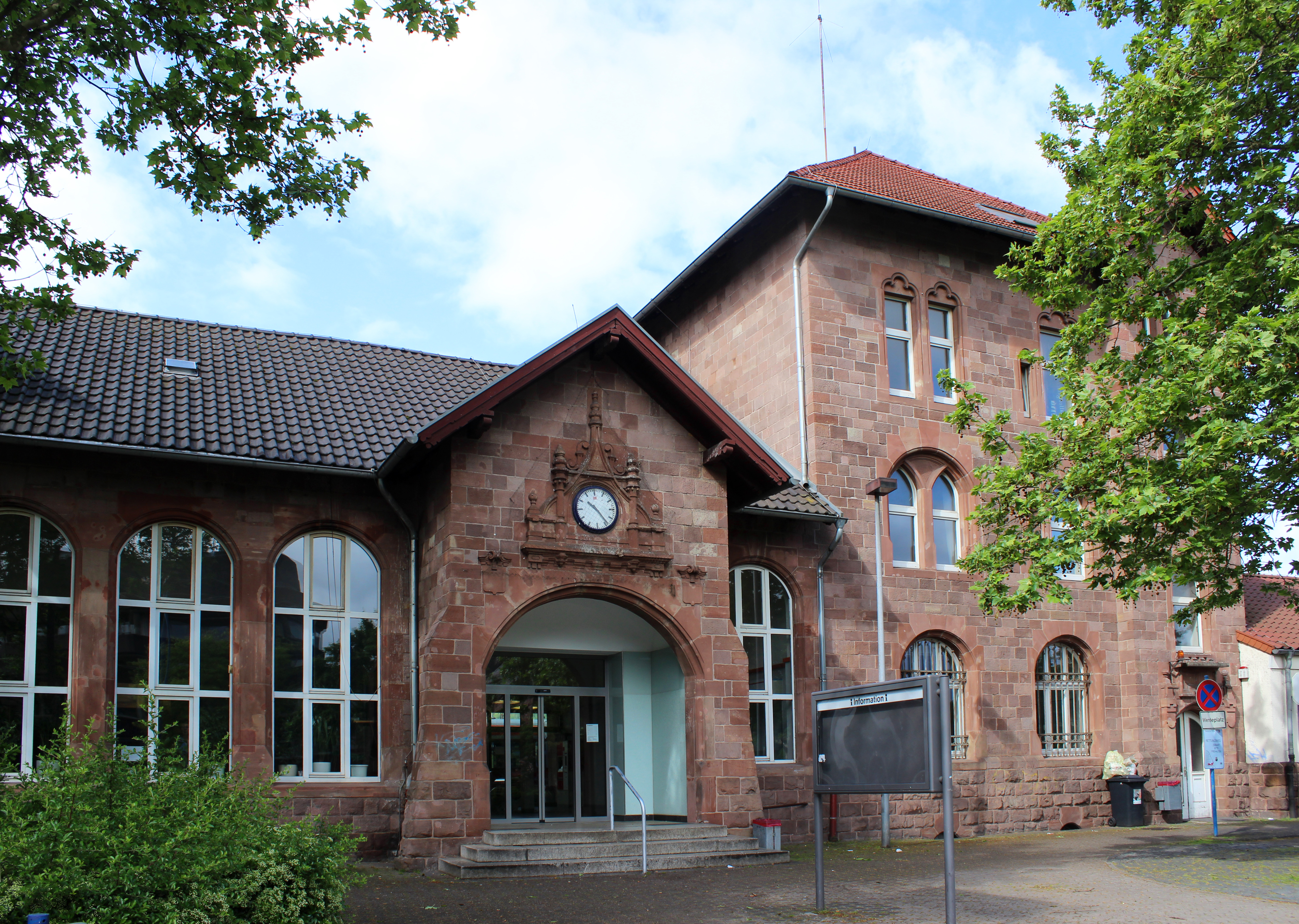
Train station

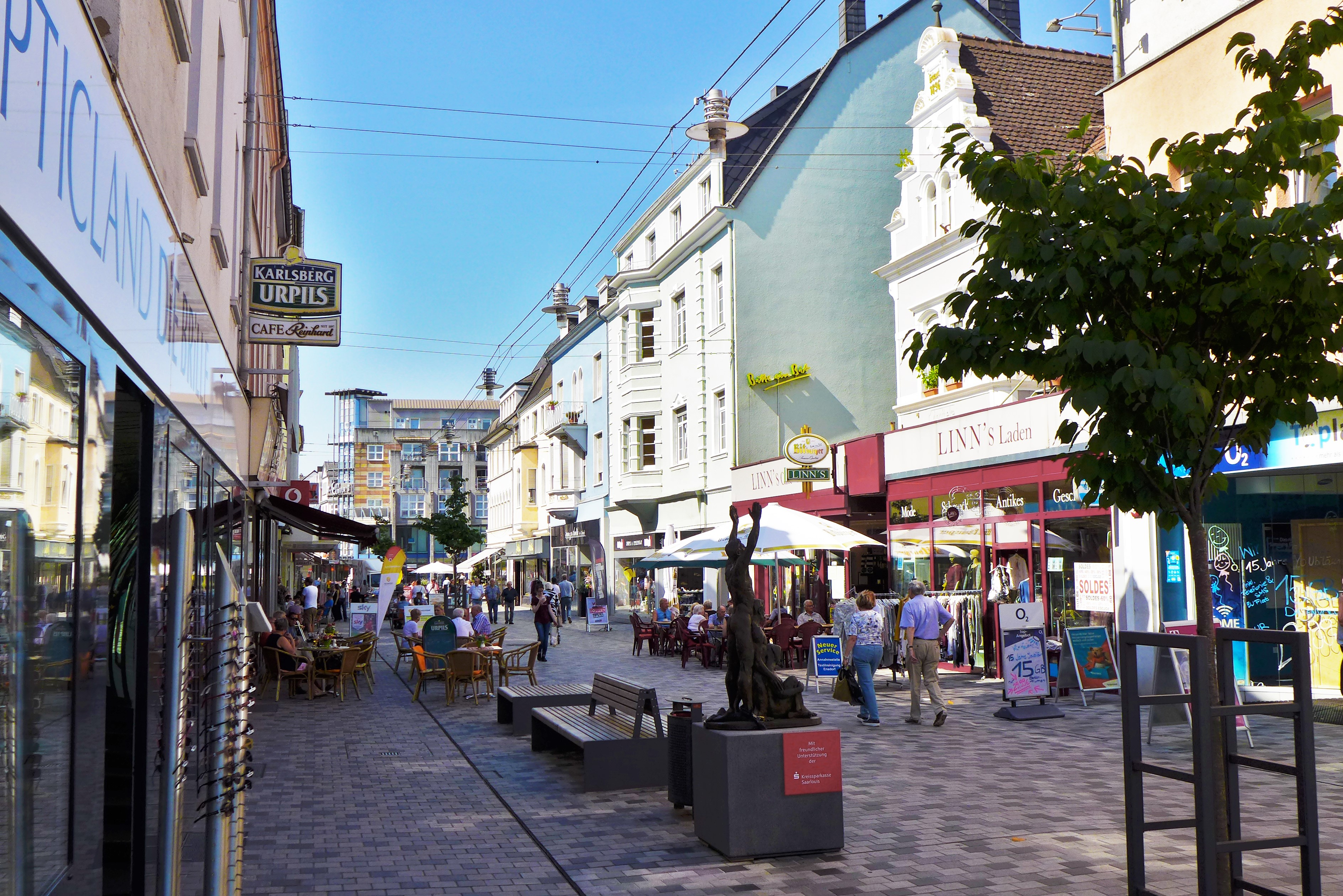
Pedestrian zone, Stummstraße

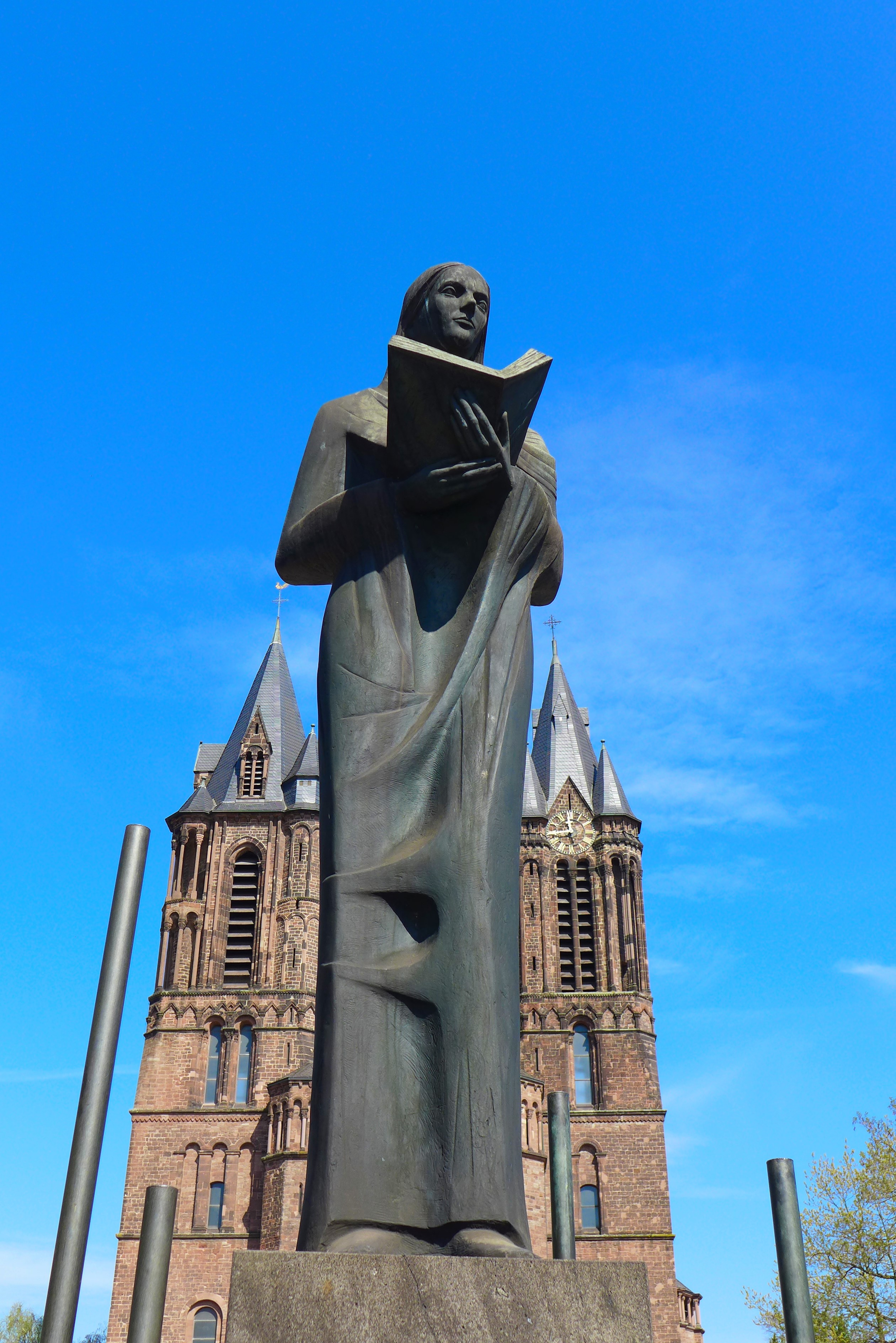
Statue of Odile of Alsace in front of Saardom

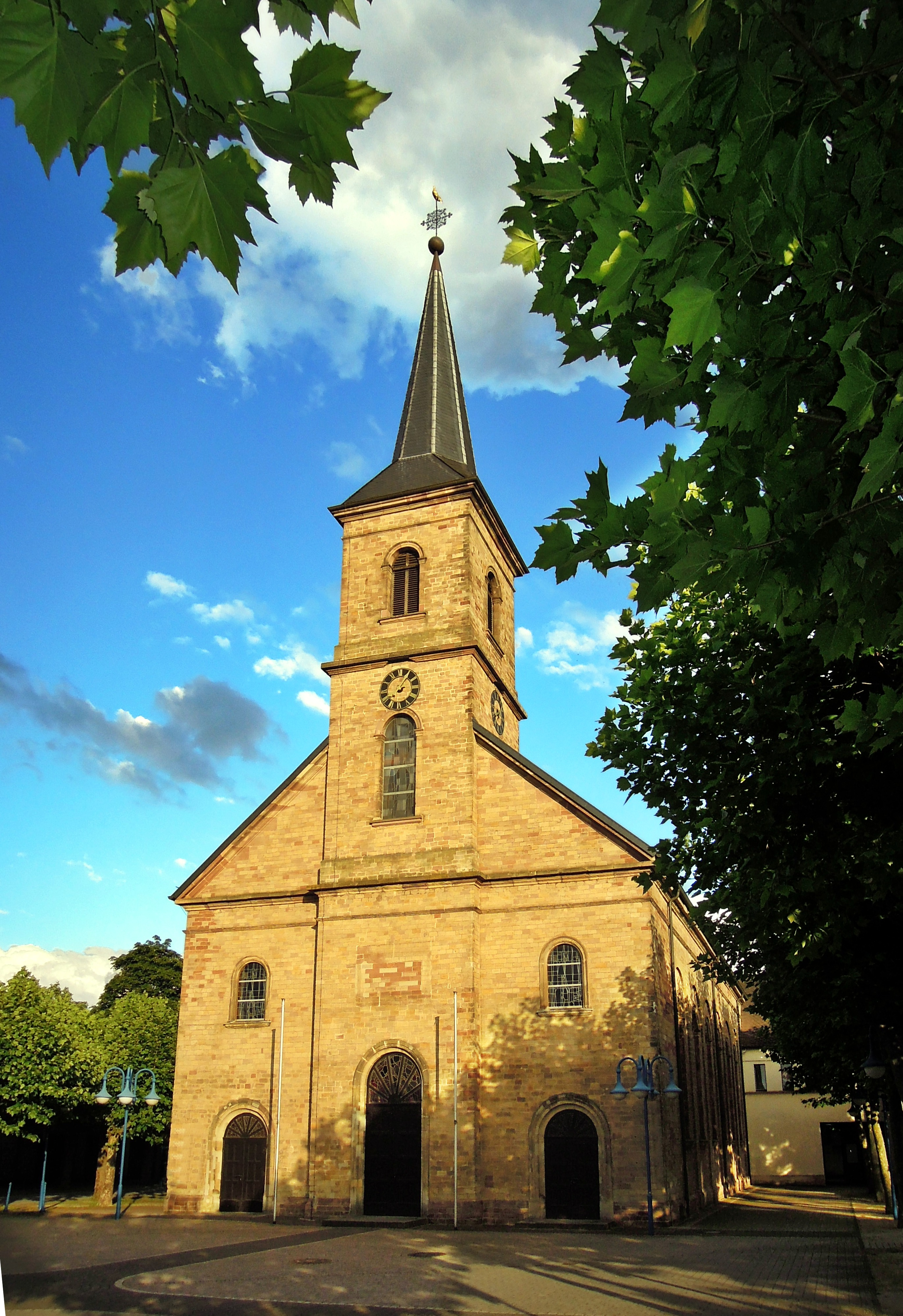
Church St. John the Baptist

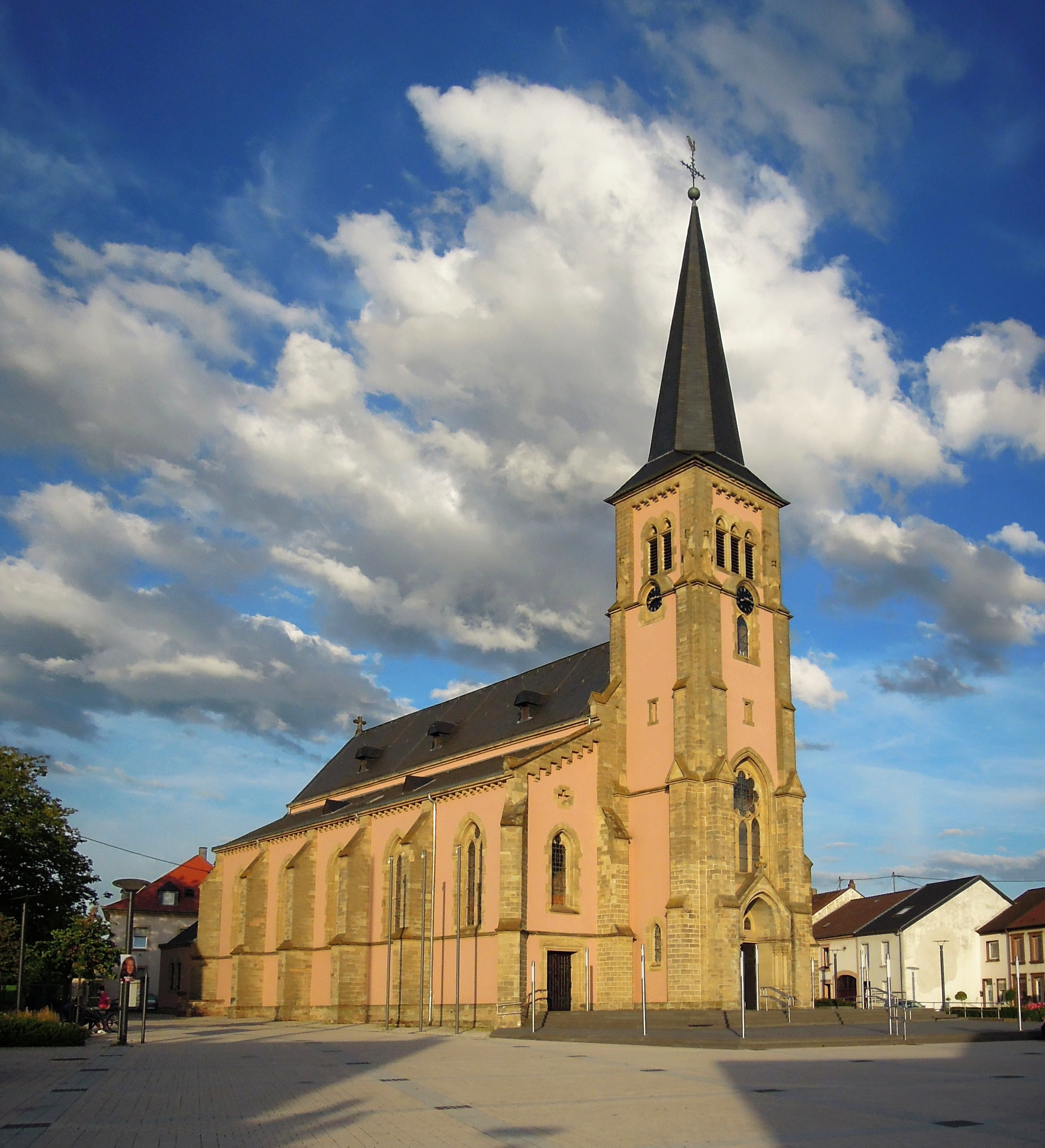
Church St. Maximin and the Fourteen Holy Helpers, Pachten

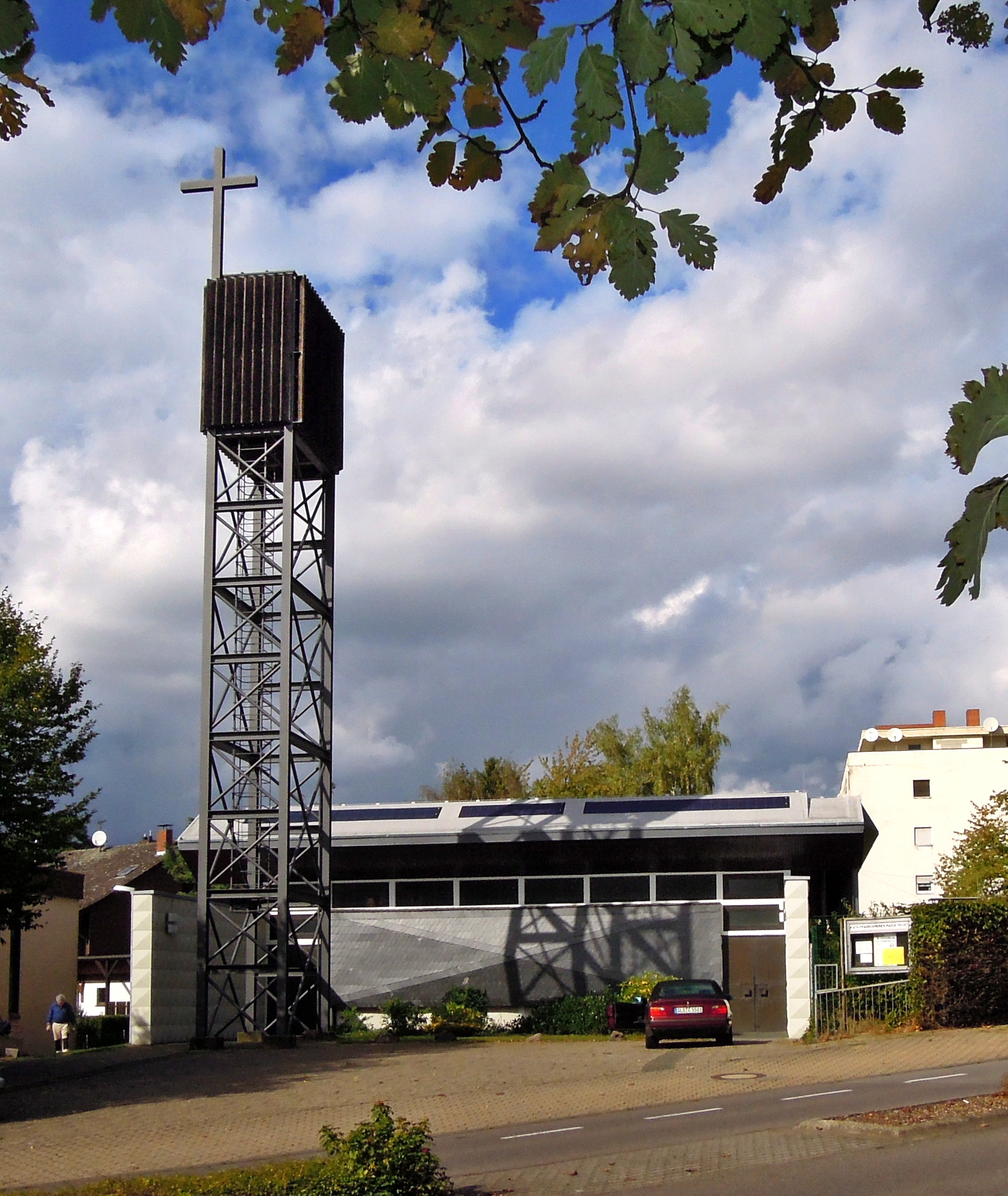
Church of Our Lady (Maria Consolatrix Afflictorum), Pachtener Heide

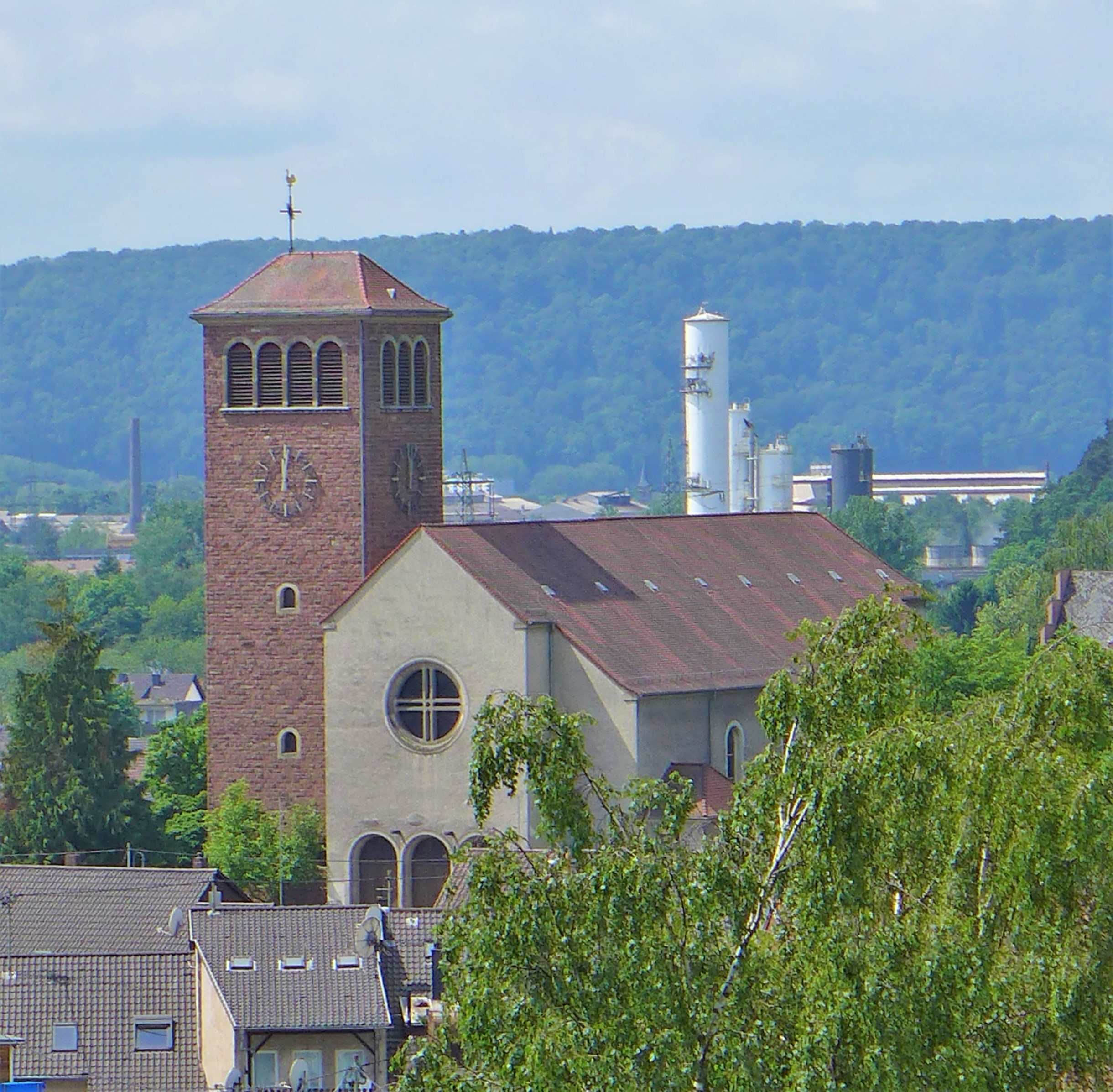
Church Saint Joseph and Saint Wendelin, Diefflen

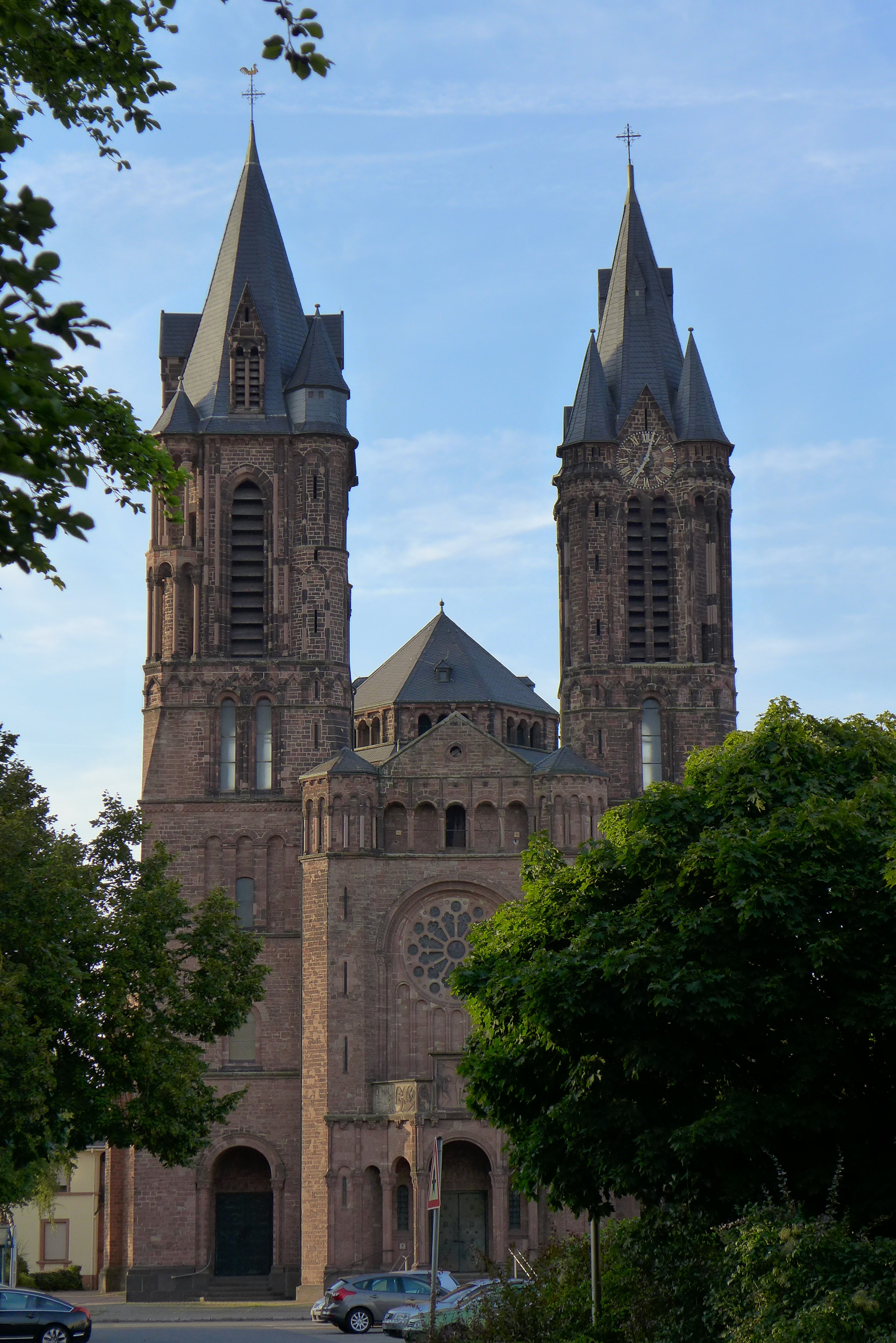
Church of the Blessed Sacrament (Saardom)

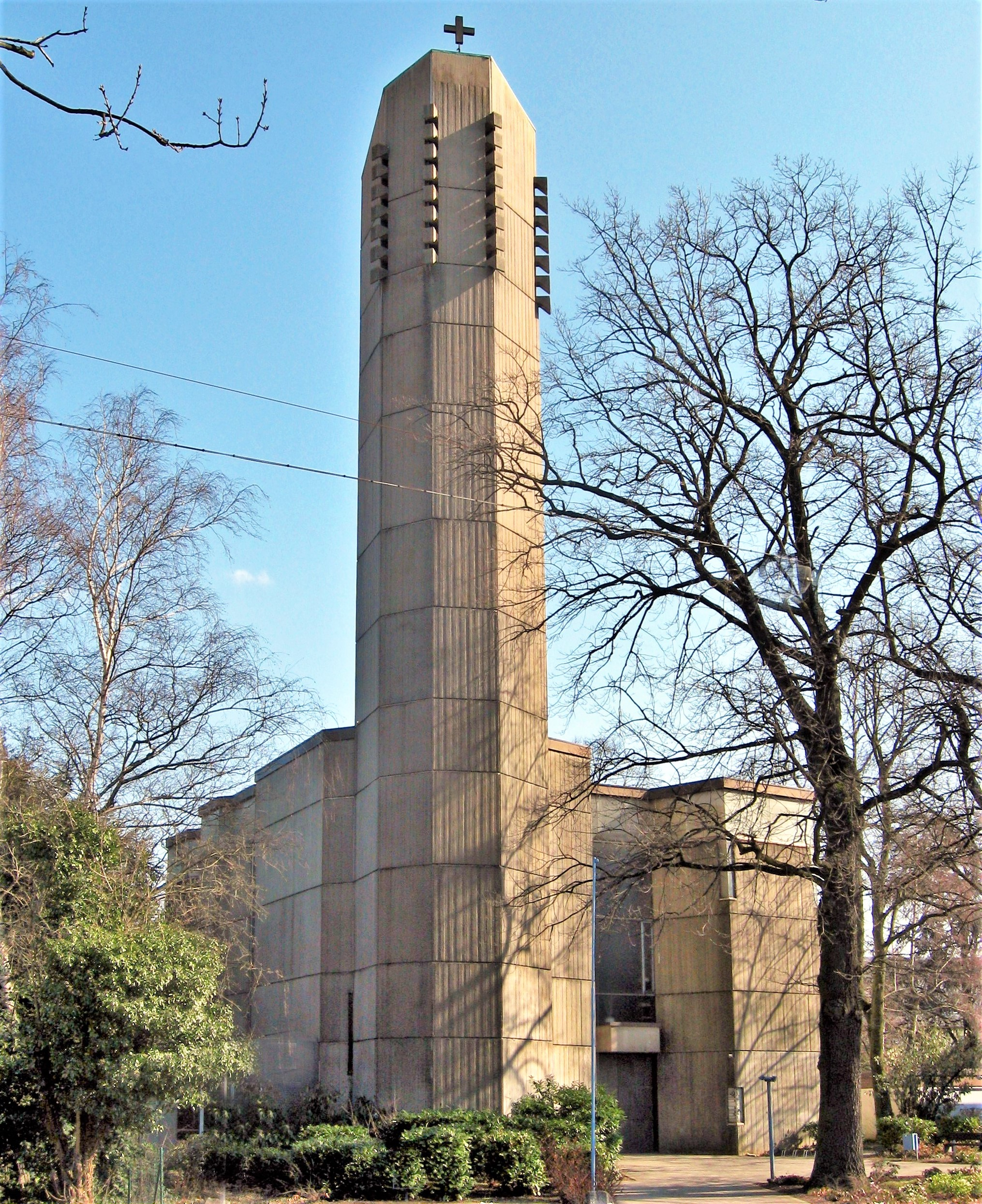
Protestant Church

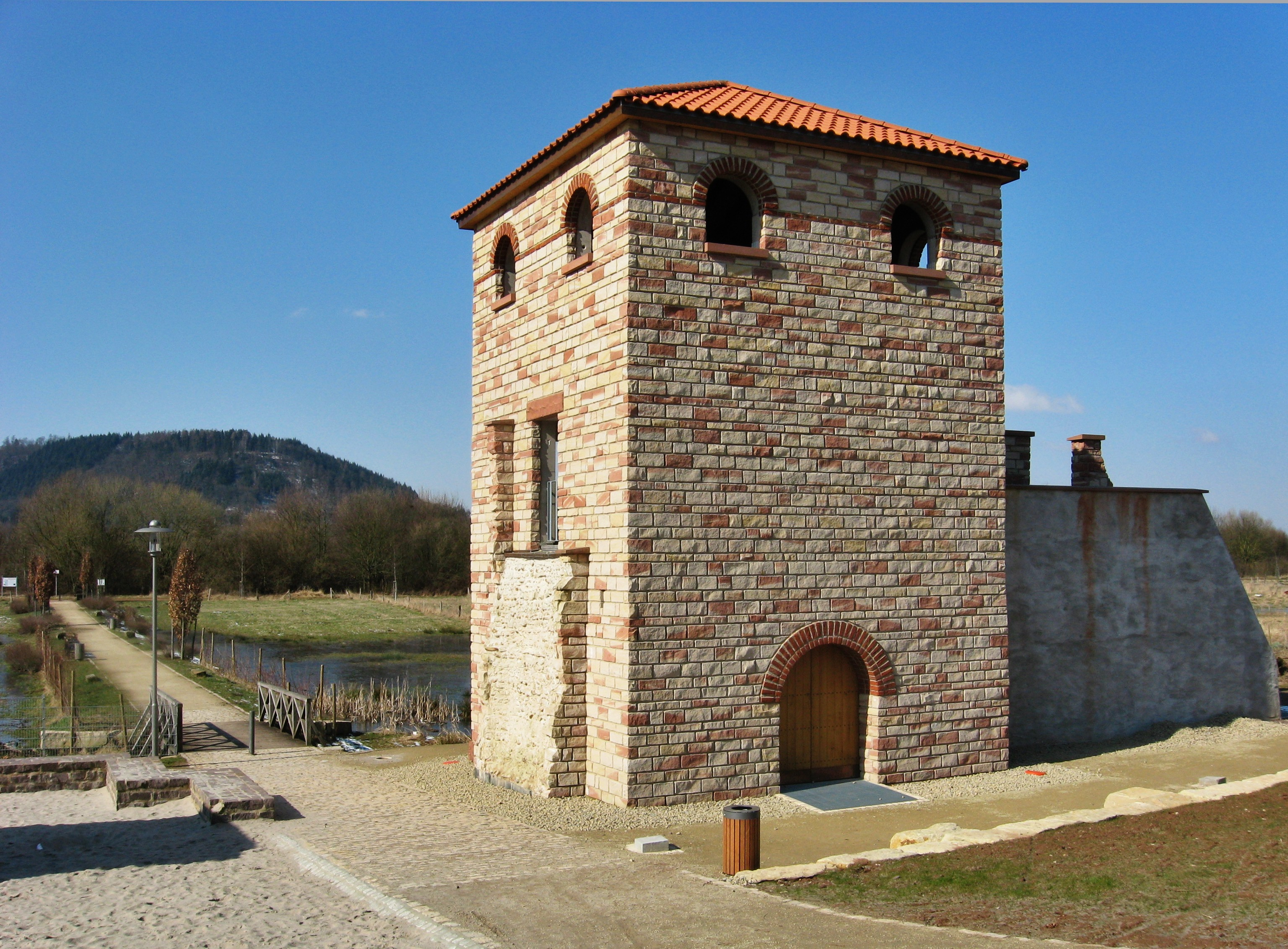
Roman fortress, Reconstruction, Pachten

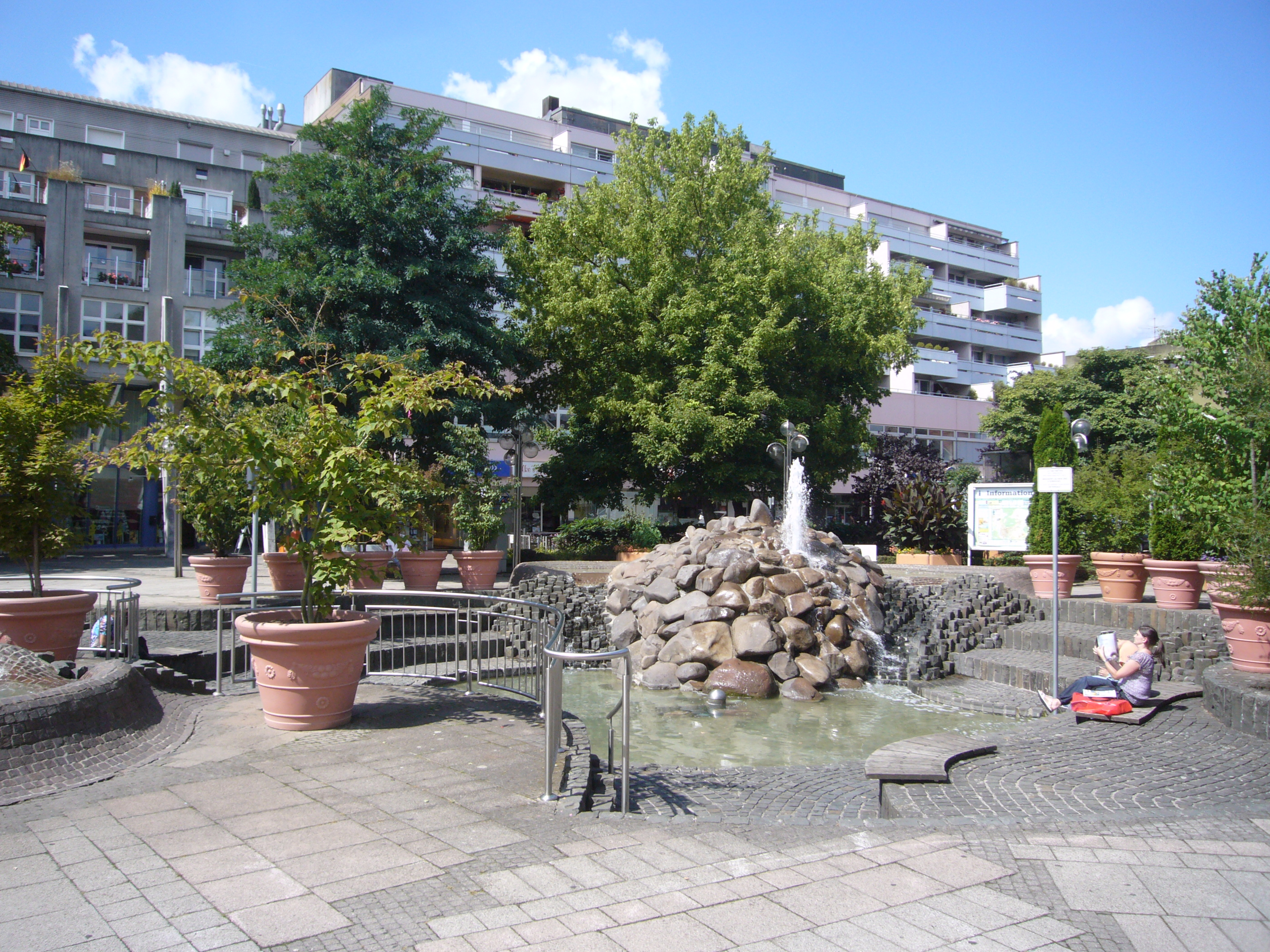
Odile of Alsace Fountain

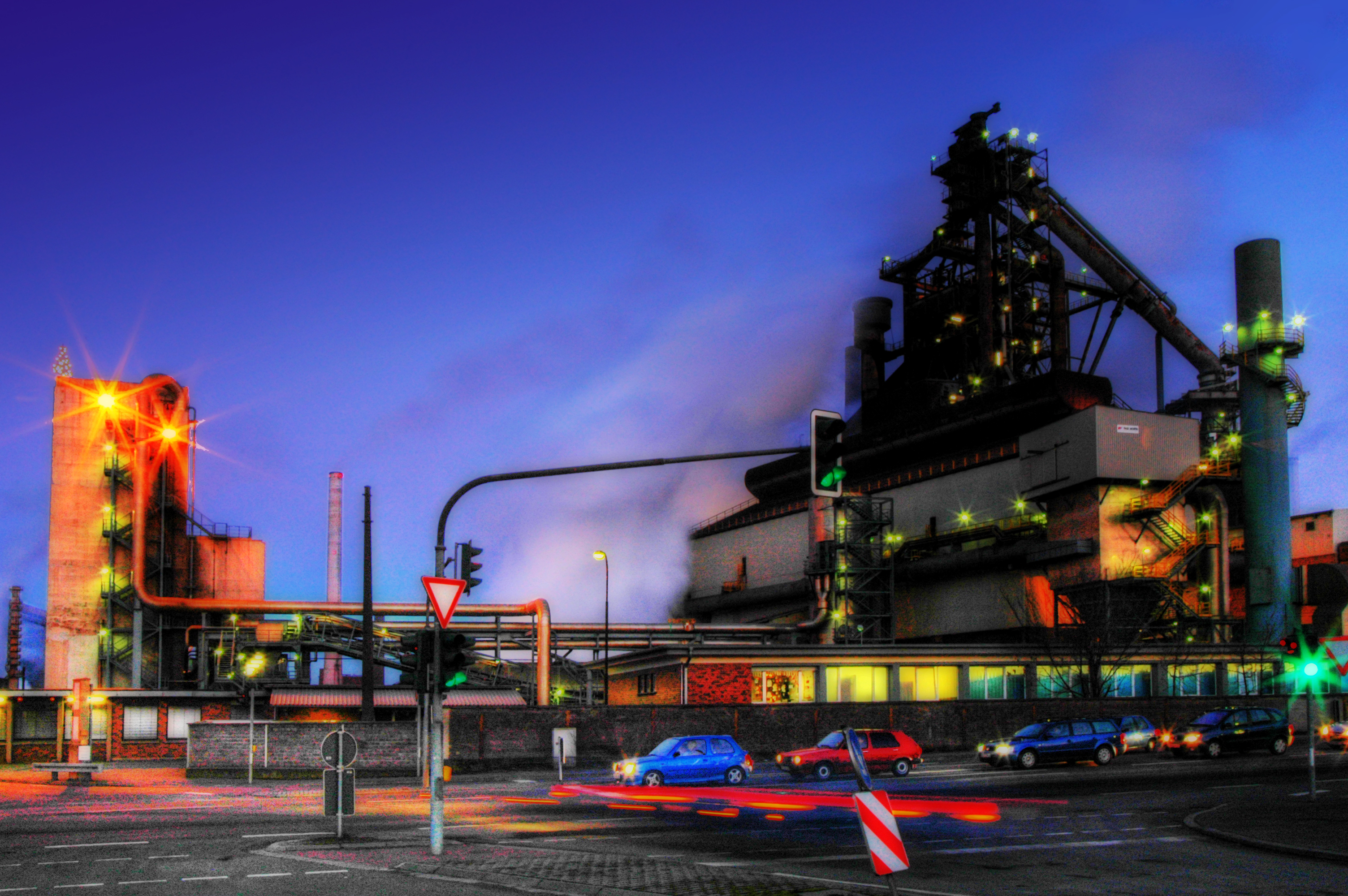
Dillinger Hütte steelworks, Blast furnace

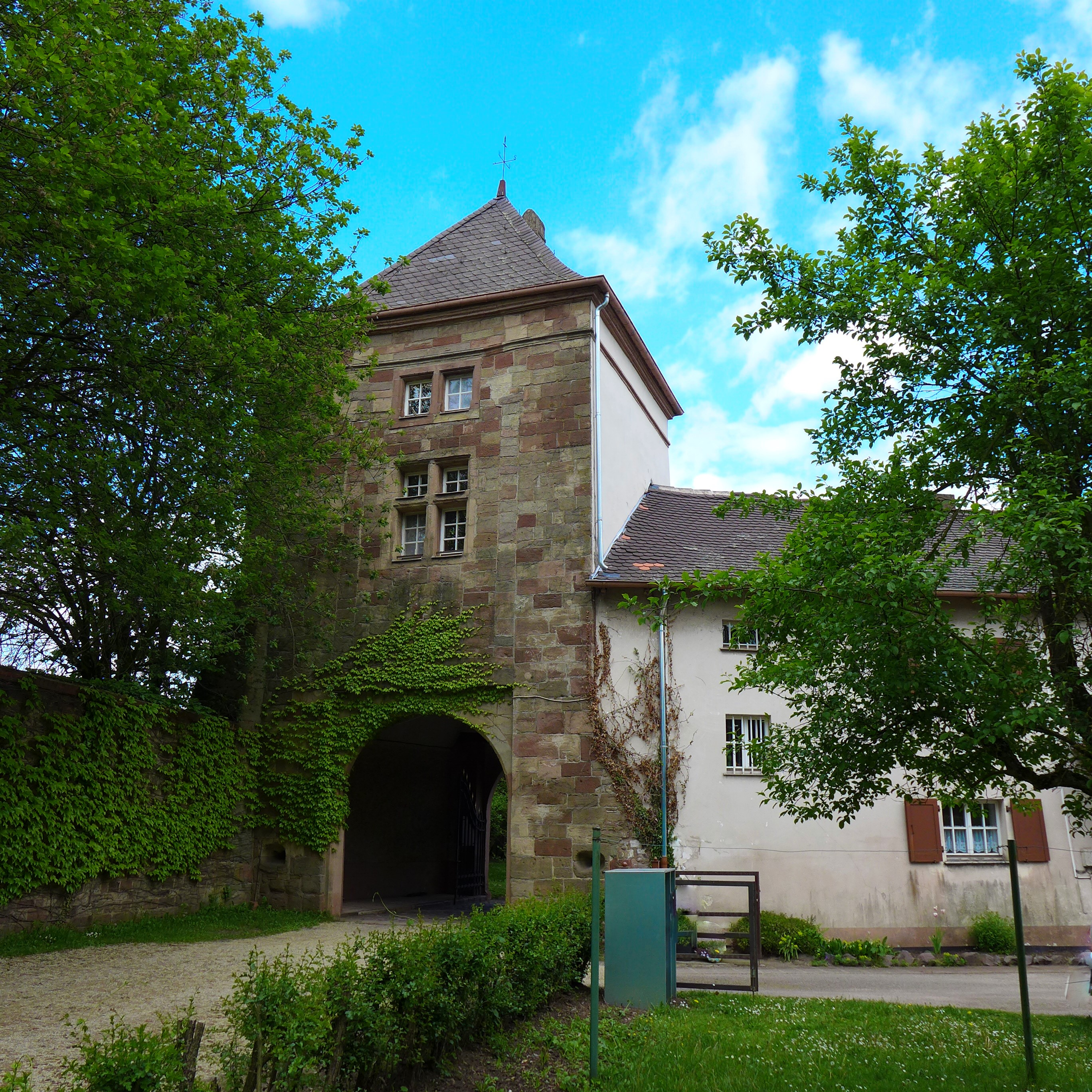
Old Castle

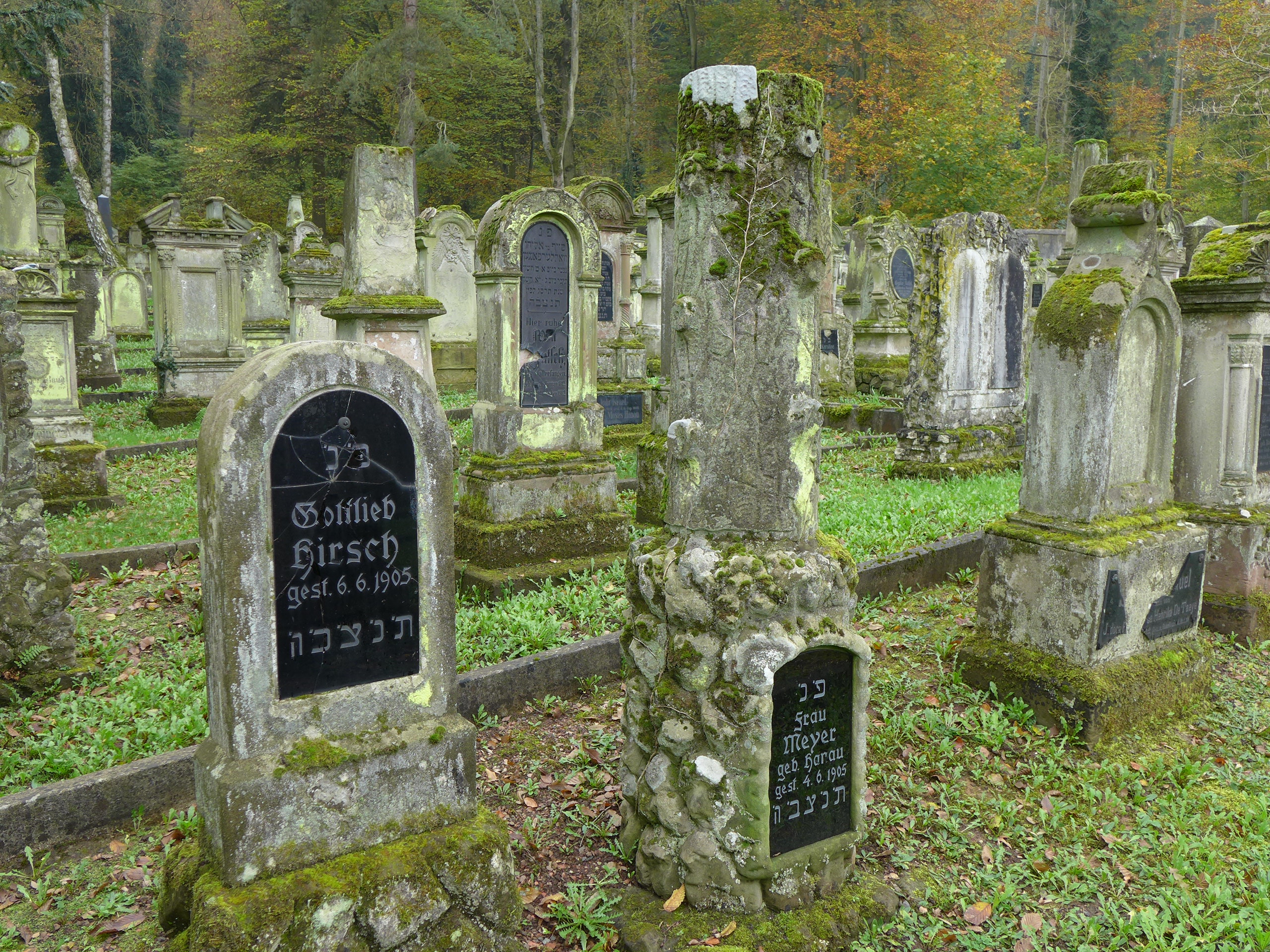
Jewish Cemetery

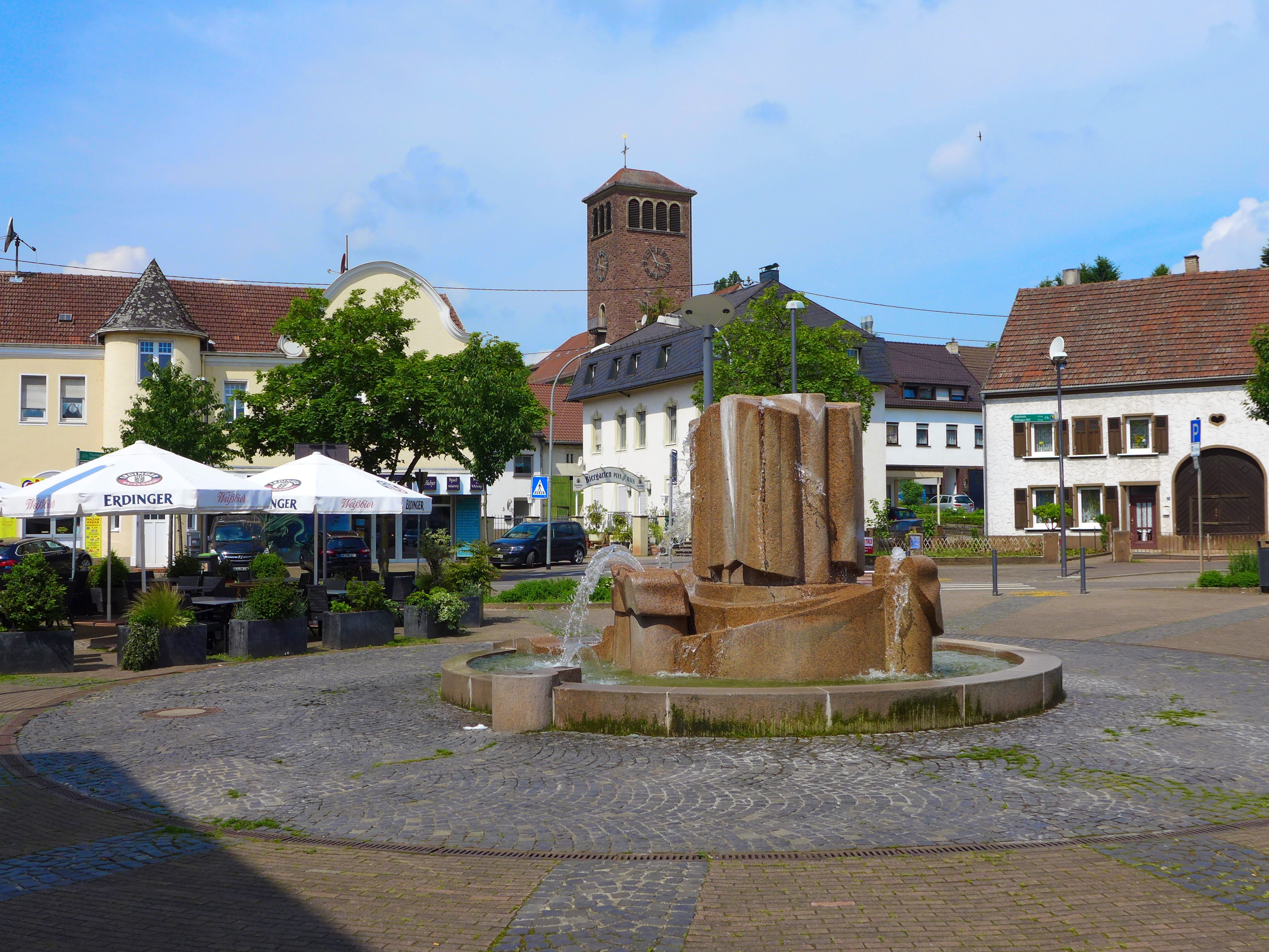
Diefflen, Village centre
