= Siegfried Alkan =

German composer (1858–1941)

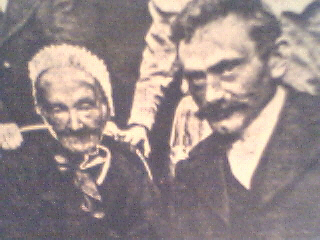
- Siegfried Alkan with his mother Johanna in an 1899 photograph
- Born: 30 March 1858; Dillingen, Saarland, Kingdom of Prussia
- Died: 24 December 1941 (aged 83); Mainz, Free State of Prussia
- Occupation: Composer

Siegfried Alkan (30 March 1858 – 24 December 1941) was a German composer from Saarland in the Kingdom of Prussia. He was assaulted and his musical business was looted during the Kristallnacht.

== Biography ==
Alkan was born in Dillingen, Saarland, within the Kingdom of Prussia to prominent Jewish piano businessman Johannes Alkan and his wife Johanna née Bonn. His grandfather and two of his nephews were also musicians. He had three siblings. He was a distant relative of the composer Felix Mendelssohn Bartholdy through his mother's relationship to the Oppenheim family.

In November 1938, when he was in his eighties, Alkan was assaulted in the street during the Kristallnacht, and all the musical instruments and sheet music in his shop were destroyed, and his piano looted by the Nazis. He refused to seek treatment at a Christian hospital, he tried to seek help at his synagogue, unaware it had been set ablaze. He relocated to Mainz, where he died in 1941 for causes unrelated to persecution. He never married.

=== Posthumous information ===
In November 2018, the city of Dillingen held a communal ceremony for the victims of the Kristallnacht, which included honoring Alkan and 50 others. In 2019, Katja Terlau, a specialist in looted art, and the Rose Valland Institute were able to trace Alkan's piano to a purchase in 1982.

== Music ==
Alkan's sheet music was written for the piano and the organ. He composed at least 99 musical compositions. His work was distributed by Friedrich Hofmeister Musikverlag and Kistner & Siegel in Leipzig:

- "Gruß an die Saar" (English: "Greetings to the Saar"; Op. 32)
- "O wüsstest du's" (English: "Oh, if only you knew"; Op. 39)
- "Ur-Großmütterchen" (English: "Proto-Great-grandmother"; Op. 80)
- "Neues Saarlied" (English: "New Saar Song"; Op. 91)
- "Es wälzt sich der Nebel im Thale" (English: "The fog rolls through the valley"; Op. 92)
- "Hab' deine Eltern lieb!" (English: "Love thy parents!" Op. 99)
