= Dillingen (Saar) station =

Railway station in Dillingen/Saar, Germany

Dillingen (Saar)
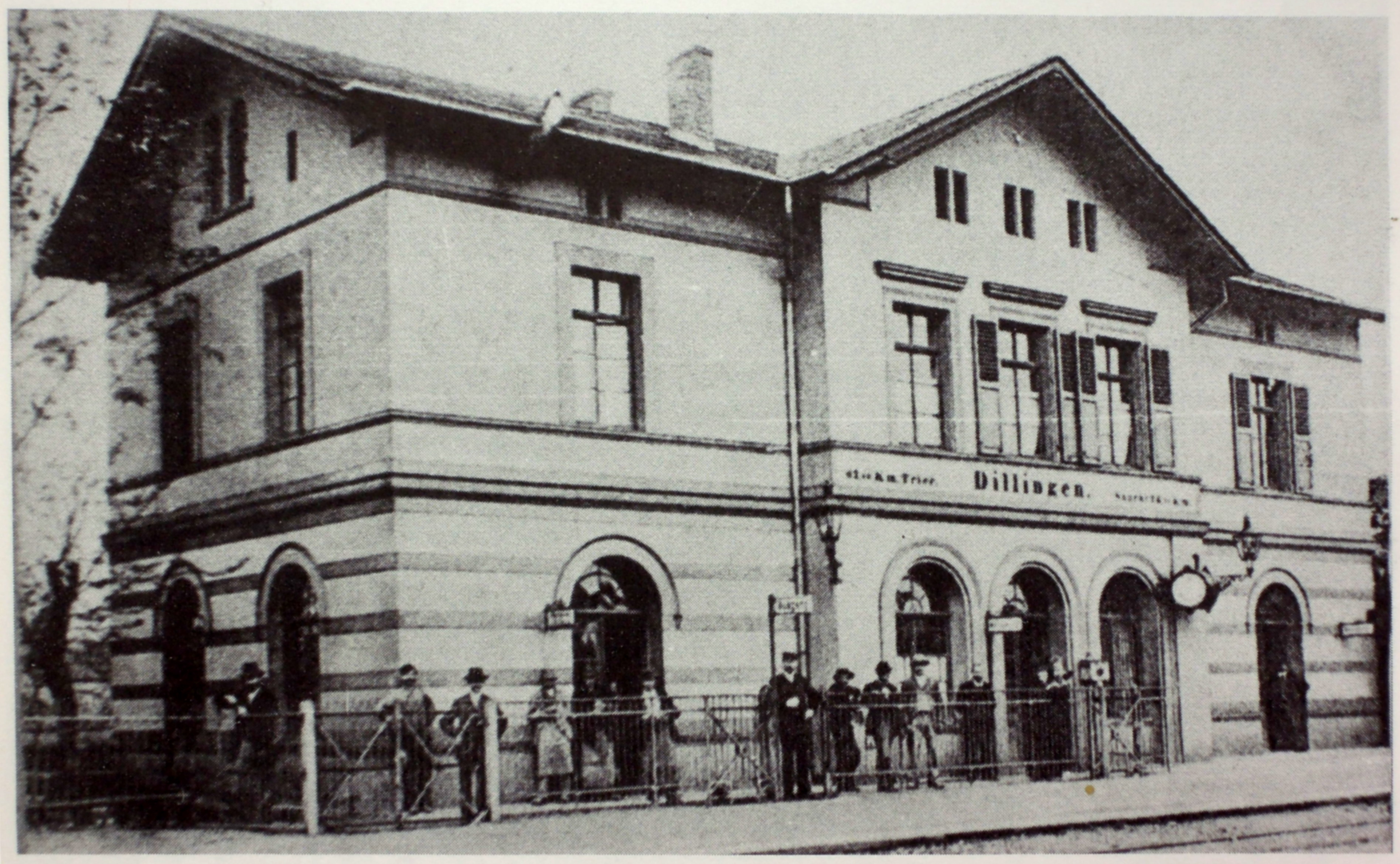
- Original station building

General information
- Location: Berkheimstr. 1, Dillingen (Saar), Saarland; Germany
- Coordinates: 49°21′09″N 6°43′21″E
- Lines: Saar Railway (KBS 685); Nied Valley Railway (KBS 687); Prims Valley Railway (only museum & freight)
- Platforms: 5 (2 unused)

Construction
- Accessible: Yes

Other information
- Station code: 4837
- DS100 code: SDL
- IBNR: 8000075
- Category: 4
- Fare zone: SaarVV: 411
- Website: www.bahnhof.de

History
- Opened: 16 December 1858

Services
Preceding station	DB Regio Mitte	Following station
Merzig (Saar) towards Koblenz Hbf	RE 1 Südwest-Express	Saarlouis Hbf towards Heidelberg Hbf
Beckingen (Saar) towards Merzig (Saar)	RB 70	Saarlouis Hbf towards Kaiserslautern Hbf
Beckingen (Saar) towards Schweich DB	RB 71	Saarlouis Hbf towards Kaiserslautern Hbf
Siersburg towards Niedaltdorf	RB 77	Terminus
Location

Dillingen (Saar) station is on the Saar Railway between Saarbrücken and Trier in the town of Dillingen in the German state of the Saarland. The station is classified by Deutsche Bahn as a category 4 station. A bus station is connected to the station.

== Location ==
Dillingen station is located on the western edge of the town centre of Dillingen, very close to the post office, the pedestrianised Stummstraße, the town hall and the Stadthalle (a venue for cultural events) and is on the bus network of the district transport company, Kreisverkehrsbetriebe Saarlouis and is served by regional buses. Parking is available in front of the entrance building for private short-term parking and bicycles.

The station has a travel centre and shopping. It has step-free access to platforms 1 and the island platform serving tracks 4 and 5.

The station is the terminus of the Nied Valley Railway (Niedtalbahn) to Niedaltdorf and until 1945 passenger services ran to Bouzonville and at times to Metz. Once a year on Good Friday, services again run over this line over the French border to Bouzonville.

== Entrance building ==
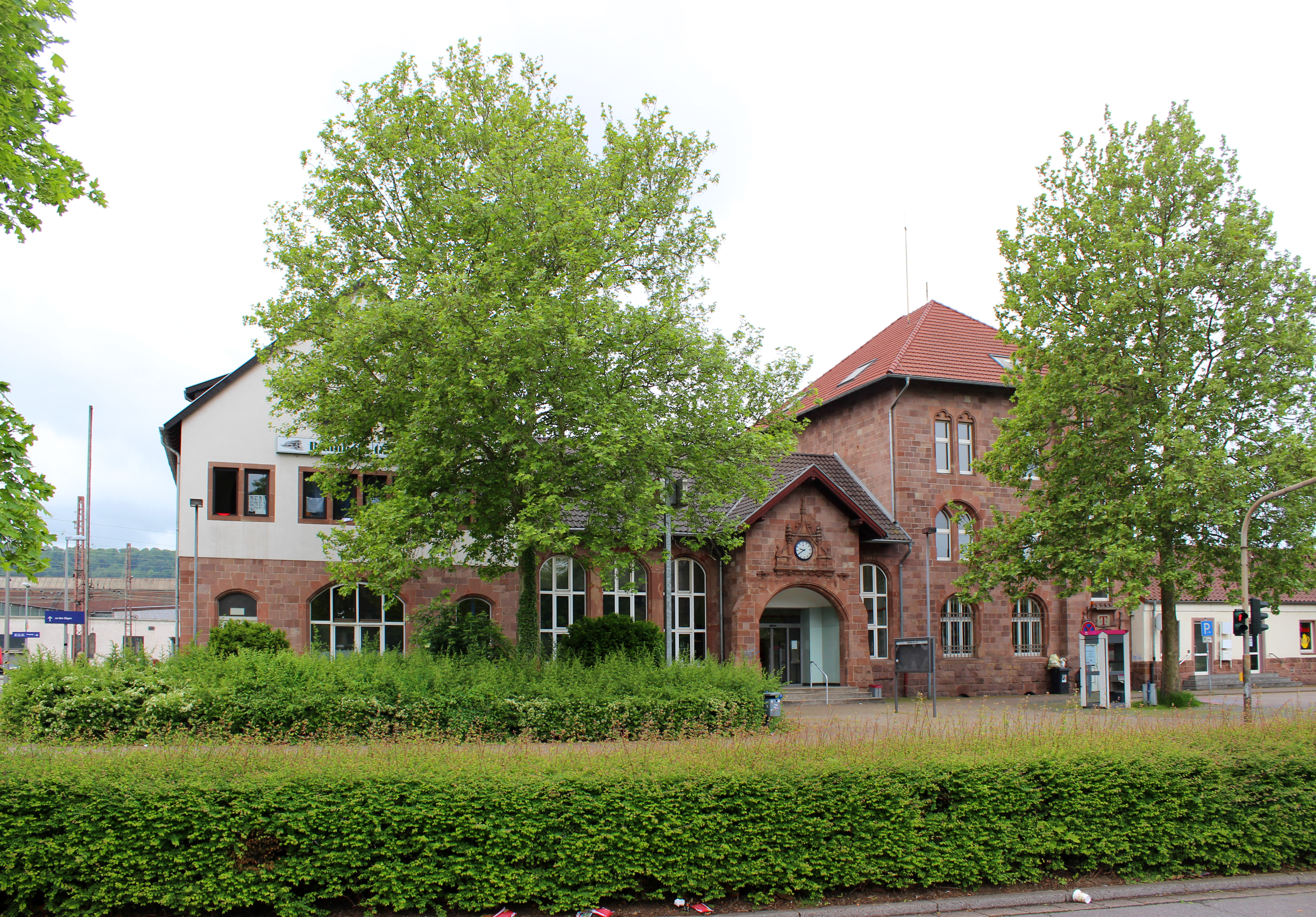
Dillingen, Entrance Building, 2014

The original station building was opened in 1858 and completely renovated between 1890 and the First World War. The precise date of construction of the new building is not known. The building is built as a rectangular building with irregular projections, but its exterior has complex shapes.

== Services ==
Dillingen station is part of the Saarländischer Verkehrsverbund (SaarVV; Saarland Transport Association), and it is in fare zone 411 (Dillingen). It is served by the following lines (Dec 2016):

Line	Route	Frequency
RE 1	Südwest-Express	Koblenz Hbf – Cochem – Wittlich Hbf – Trier Hbf – Saarburg (Bz Trier) – Merzig (Saar) – Dillingen (Saar) – Saarlouis Hbf – Völklingen – Saarbrücken Hbf – Homburg (Saar) Hbf – Landstuhl – Kaiserslautern Hbf – Neustadt (Weinstr) Hbf – Ludwigshafen (Rhein) Mitte – Mannheim Hbf
RB 70	Saartal-Bahn	Merzig (Saar) – Beckingen (Saar) – Dillingen (Saar) – Saarlouis – Bous (Saar) – Völklingen – Saarbrücken Hbf – St. Ingbert – Homburg (Saar) Hbf – Landstuhl – Kaiserslautern Hbf
RB 71	Saartal-Bahn	Trier Hbf – Saarburg – Merzig (Saar) – Beckingen (Saar) – Dillingen (Saar) – Saarlouis – Bous (Saar) – Völklingen – Saarbrücken Hbf – St. Ingbert – Homburg (Saar) Hbf
RB 77	Nied-Bahn	Dillingen (Saar) – Siersburg – Hemmersdorf – Niedaltdorf
