= Saarlouis Hauptbahnhof =

Railway station in Saarlouis, Germany

Saarlouis Hbf
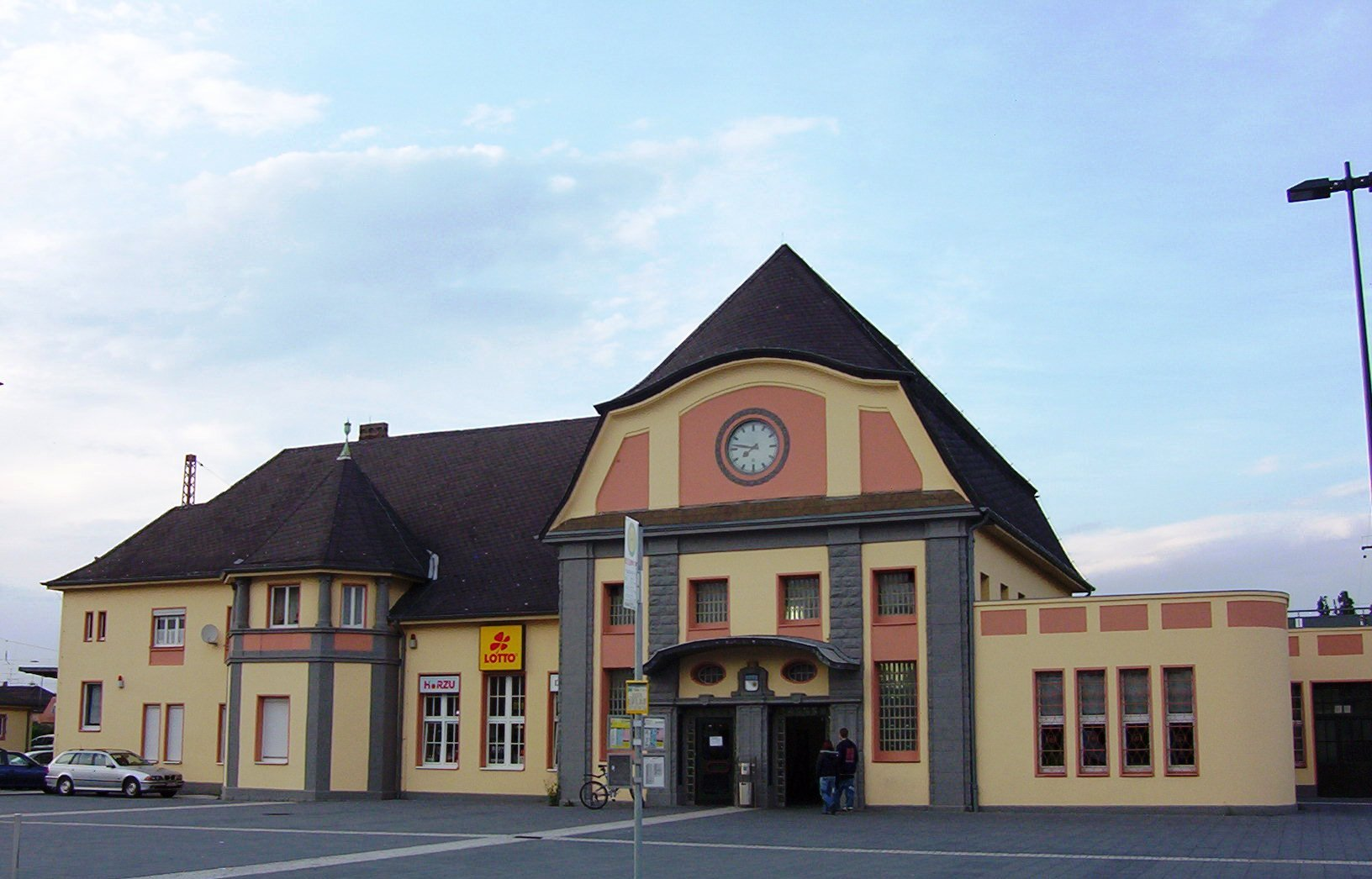

General information
- Location: Bahnhofsplatz 11, Saarlouis, Saarland; Germany
- Coordinates: 49°19′40″N 6°45′01″E
- Lines: Saarbrücken-Trier (Saar line, KBS 685)
- Platforms: 3

Construction
- Accessible: Yes

Other information
- Station code: 5458
- DS100 code: SSLS
- IBNR: 8005247
- Category: 3
- Fare zone: SaarVV: 452
- Website: www.bahnhof.de

History
- Opened: 19 December 1909

Passengers
- < 5000

Services
Preceding station	DB Regio Mitte	Following station
Dillingen (Saar) towards Koblenz Hbf	RE 1 Südwest-Express	Völklingen towards Heidelberg Hbf
Dillingen (Saar) towards Merzig (Saar)	RB 70	Ensdorf (Saar) towards Kaiserslautern Hbf
Dillingen (Saar) towards Schweich DB	RB 71	Ensdorf (Saar) towards Kaiserslautern Hbf
Location

Saarlouis Hauptbahnhof is the only station in the town of Saarlouis in the German state of Saarland. It is on the Saar line between Trier and Saarbrucken in the district of Roden, about 1 km north of the city centre. It is classified by Deutsche Bahn as a category 3 station.

== History ==
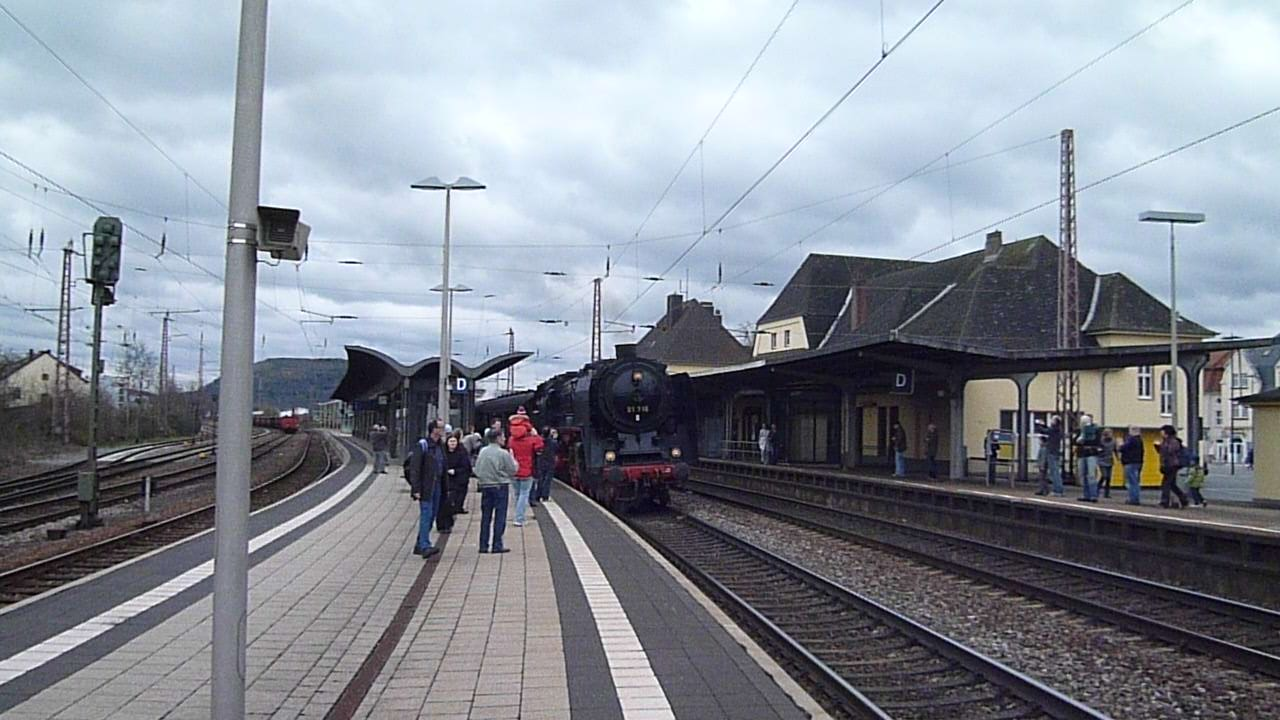
Class 01 running towards Dillingen

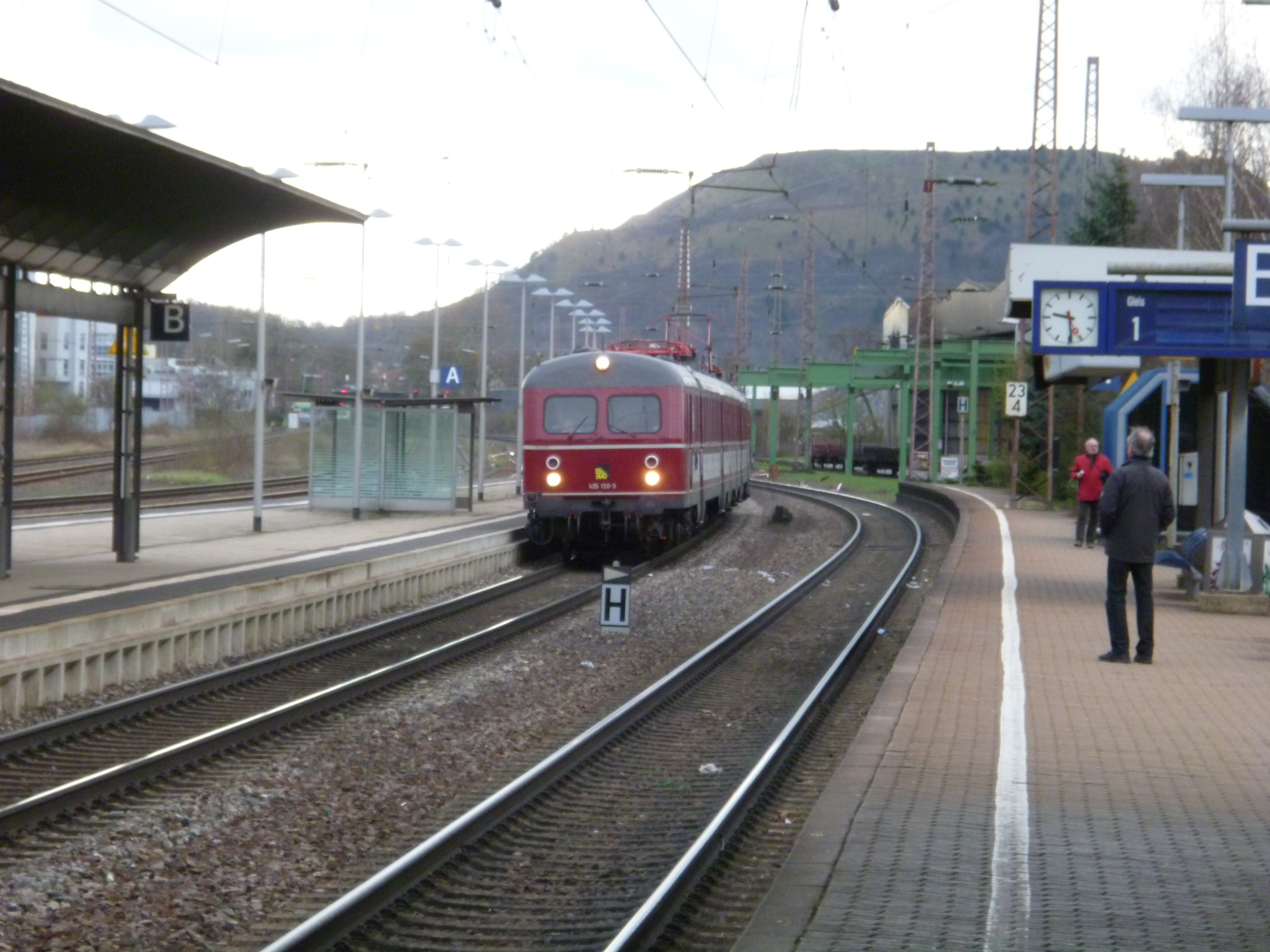
Class ET 25 entering from Ensdorf

The first station on the territory of today's Saarlouis was opened in Fraulautern on 16 December 1858 during the construction of the Saar line. However, Saarlouis was cut off from rail traffic, which hindered its economic development and the city fell behind the neighbouring communities of Dillingen and Bous. This initially led to the establishment of the Straßen- und Kleinbahnen im Kreis Saarlouis (Tramways and Light Railways in the District of Saarlouis). In addition, it was decided to construct a railway station in the current district of Roden. Saarlouis station was opened on the present site on 19 December 1912. From the mid-1960s the station was connected to the electrical network of Deutsche Bundesbahn after the station was renamed to Saarlouis Hauptbahnhof ("main station", although there are no other stations in Saarlouis). Until 2002, InterRegio services also stopped in Saarlouis; since then the station has only been served by regional services.

== Infrastructure ==
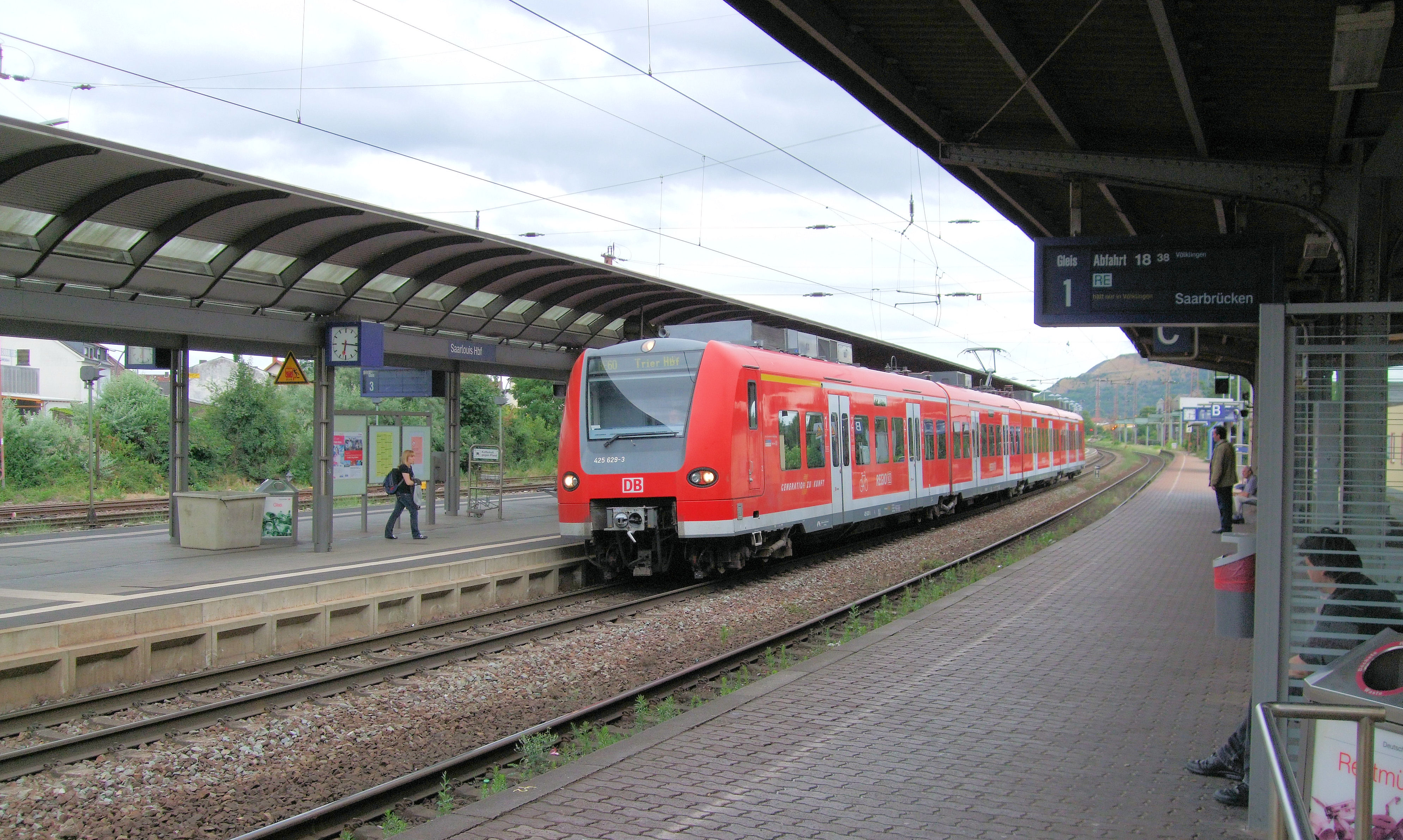
Class 425 running as RE 60 to Trier entering platform track 2

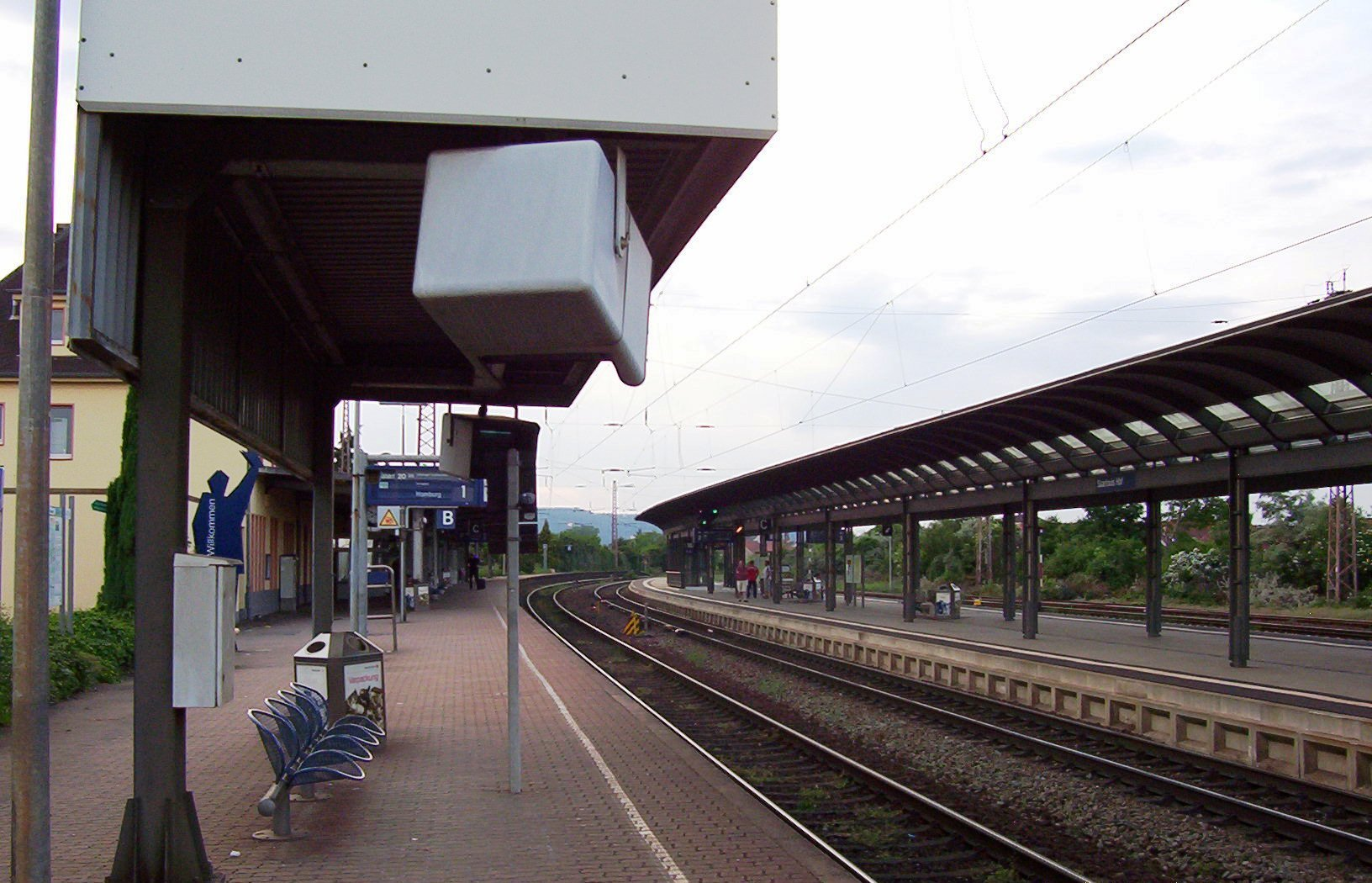
Platforms looking towards Dillingen

The station has three platforms tracks and three freight tracks that have no platform. Platform 1 has a length of 314 m and a height of 76 cm, track 2 and 3 are each 300 m long and 55 cm high. Barrier-free access for the disabled is only possible on platform 1. Tracks 2 and 3 are only accessible via a pedestrian tunnel with stairs. The station has a travel centre. In front of the station there are parking spaces, bicycle parking, taxi stands and restrooms. The station building was replaced as part of a renovation program for stations in the Saarland, which was completed in 2012. In 1967, relay interlocking was installed at the station.

== Rail services ==
The station is now only served by regional trains. Its fares are regulated by the Saarländischen Verkehrsverbund (Saarland Transport Association) as part of German fare zone 452.

Line	Name	Route	Frequency
RE 1	Mosel-Saar-Express	Koblenz Hbf – Cochem – Wittlich Hbf – Trier Hbf – Saarburg – Merzig (Saar) – Dillingen – Saarlouis Hbf – Völklingen - Saarbrücken Hbf	Every 2 hours
RB 70	Saartal-Bahn	Merzig (Saar) – Beckingen (Saar) – Dillingen (Saar) – Saarlouis Hbf – Bous (Saar) – Völklingen – Saarbrücken Hbf – St. Ingbert – Homburg (Saar) Hbf – Landstuhl – Kaiserslautern Hbf	60 min
RB 71	Saartal-Bahn	Trier Hbf – Saarburg – Merzig (Saar) – Beckingen (Saar) – Saarlouis Hbf – Saarbrücken Hbf – Homburg (Saar) Hbf	60 min

Outside the station, there is a bus station with buses to all parts of the city of Saarlouis, to France and to Lebach. The latter replaces the closed Prims Valley Railway (Primstalbahn).
