= Merzig (Saar) station =

Railway station in Merzig, Saarland, Germany

Merzig (Saar)
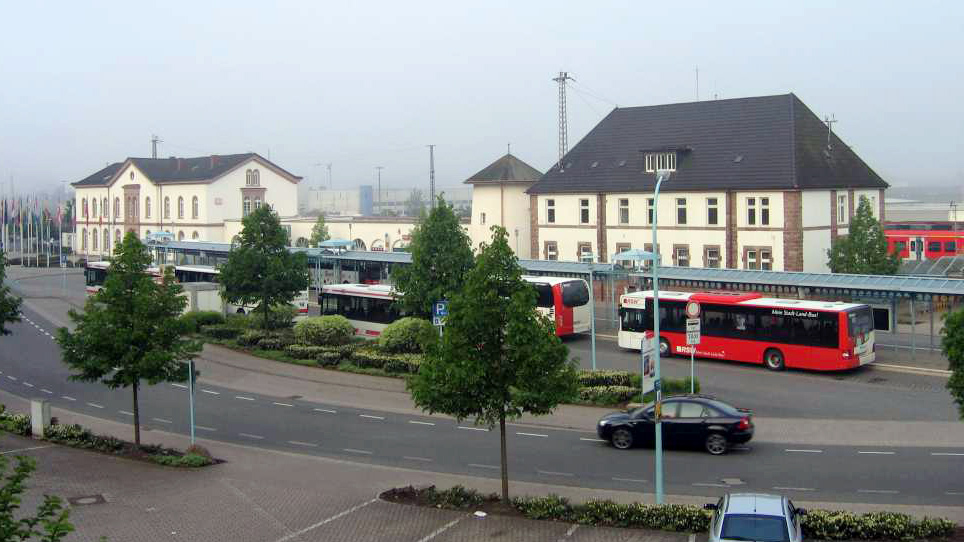

General information
- Location: Bahnhofstr. 58, Merzig, Saarland; Germany
- Coordinates: 49°26′12″N 6°38′04″E
- Lines: Saar Railway (KBS 685); Merzig–Büschfeld (formerly 265f); Merzig–Bettelainville (closed)
- Platforms: 3

Construction
- Accessible: Yes

Other information
- Station code: 4075
- DS100 code: SMZG
- IBNR: 8003992
- Category: 4
- Fare zone: SaarVV: 231
- Website: www.bahnhof.de

History
- Opened: 16 December 1858

Services
Preceding station	DB Regio Mitte	Following station
Mettlach towards Koblenz Hbf	RE 1 Südwest-Express	Dillingen (Saar) towards Heidelberg Hbf
Terminus	RB 70	Fremersdorf towards Kaiserslautern Hbf
Merzig (Saar) Stadtmitte towards Schweich DB	RB 71	Fremersdorf towards Kaiserslautern Hbf
Location

The Merzig (Saar) station is a railway station on the Saar line (German: Saarstrecke) between Trier and Saarbrücken in the town of Merzig in the German state of Saarland. Next to the station there is a bus station and a taxi stand. The station is classified by Deutsche Bahn as a category 4 station.

== Overview ==
Barrier-free access is only possible to track 1, although the station is intended to be made accessible by the disabled by 2013. The Merzig-Büschfelder railway, which is operated as a heritage railway, branched off from the station to Losheim am See. Until the Second World War, the Merzig–Bettelainville railway ran via Mechern and Mondorf to Bettelainville in France. After a bridge over the Saar was blown up at the beginning of the Second World War, this line was no longer passable. During the development of the Saar for river traffic the last remnants of the bridge piers were removed. In addition to three platform tracks the station has some freight sidings and a tank loading ramp.

== Entrance building ==
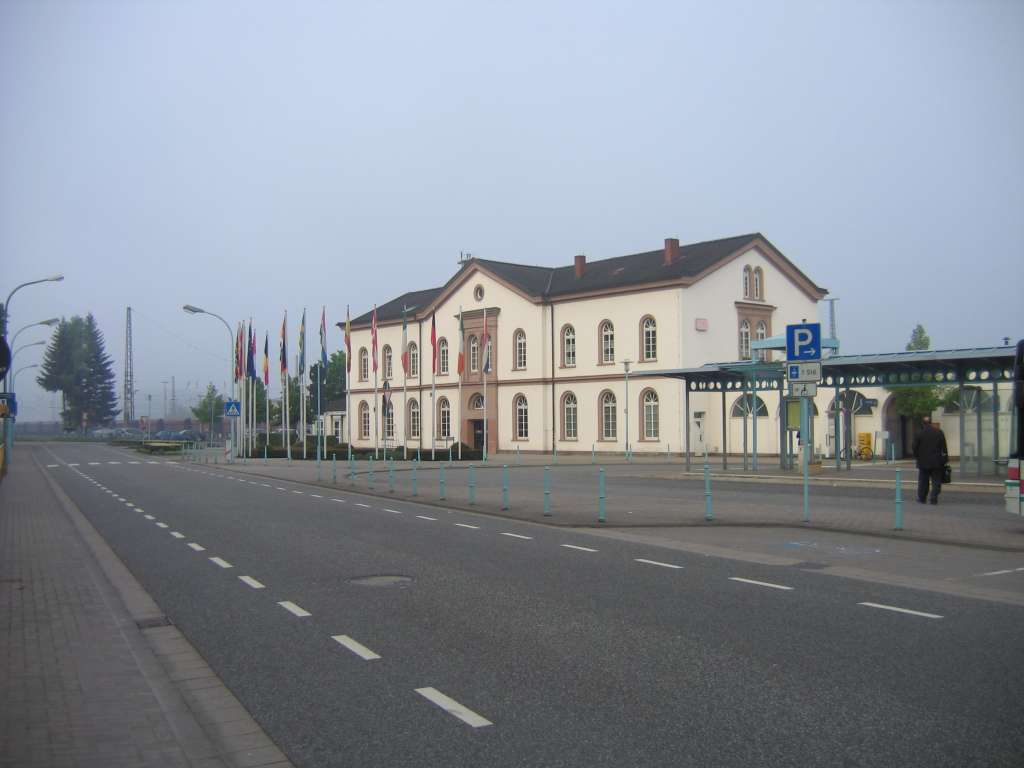
Merzig station entrance building

While construction was still underway from on the Saar line Saarbrücken to Merzig there was consideration of the construction of an entrance building in Merzig. The construction period can be accurately determined, as in 1884, a copy of the original design drawing was made, which has been preserved. This design of the floor plans, sections and elevations was dated April 1858 and had the signature of the architect's department. The construction of the building must have started shortly after that date.

== Rail services ==
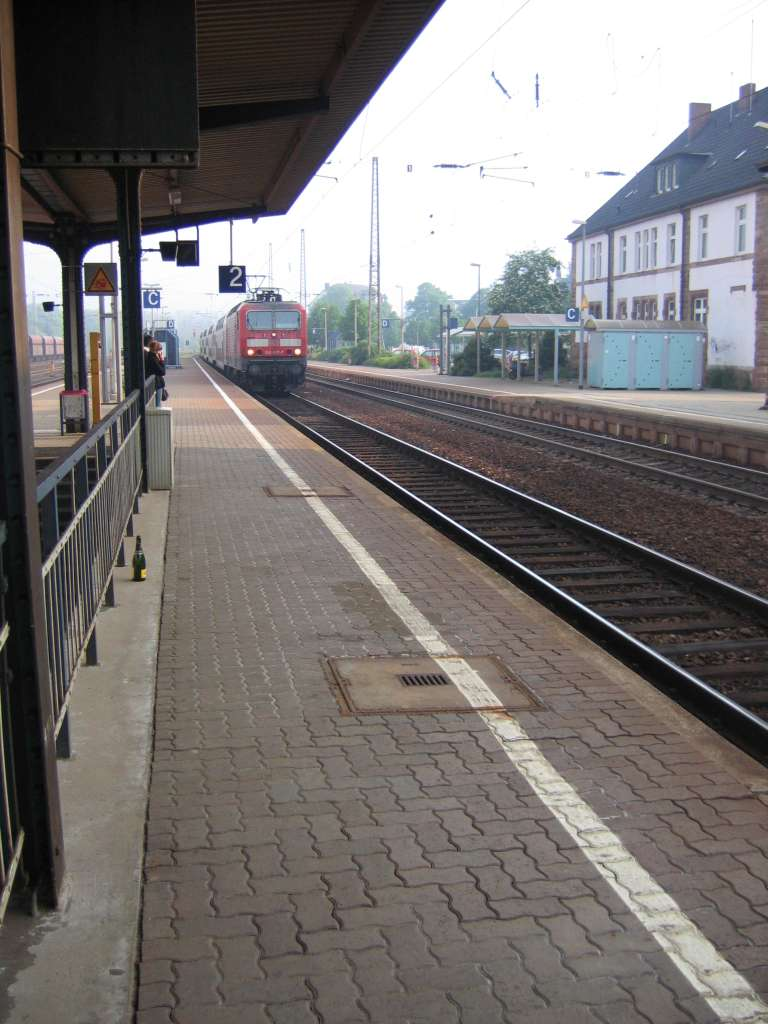
Entering Regional-Express on platform 2

The station is classified by Deutsche Bahn as a category 4 station. and its fares are regulated by the Saarländischer Verkehrsverbund (SaarVV; Saarland Transport Association). The station is in fare zone 231.

Line	Name	Route	Frequency
RE 1	Südwest-Express	Koblenz Hbf – Cochem – Wittlich Hbf – Trier Hbf – Saarburg (Bz Trier) – Merzig (Saar) – Dillingen (Saar) – Saarlouis Hbf – Völklingen – Saarbrücken Hbf – Homburg (Saar) Hbf – Landstuhl – Kaiserslautern Hbf – Neustadt (Weinstr) Hbf – Ludwigshafen (Rhein) Mitte – Mannheim Hbf	60 min
RB 70	Saartal-Bahn	Merzig (Saar) – Beckingen (Saar) – Dillingen (Saar) – Saarlouis – Bous (Saar) – Völklingen – Saarbrücken Hbf – St. Ingbert – Homburg (Saar) Hbf – Landstuhl – Kaiserslautern Hbf	60 min
RB 71	Saartal-Bahn	Trier Hbf – Saarburg – Merzig (Saar) – Beckingen (Saar) – Saarlouis Hbf – Saarbrücken Hbf – Homburg (Saar) Hbf	60 min

== Other stations in the city of Merzig ==
=== Merzig (Saar) Stadtmitte ===
Near the railway station there is the Merzig (Saar) Stadtmitte station, located in the inner city. This station has been in operation since 2000 and has ramps to give access for the disabled. It is served by regional trains.

=== Merzig-Besseringen ===
Merzig-Besseringen station is an older station. It is also served by regional trains only.
