= Völklingen station =

Railway station in Völklingen, Germany

Völklingen
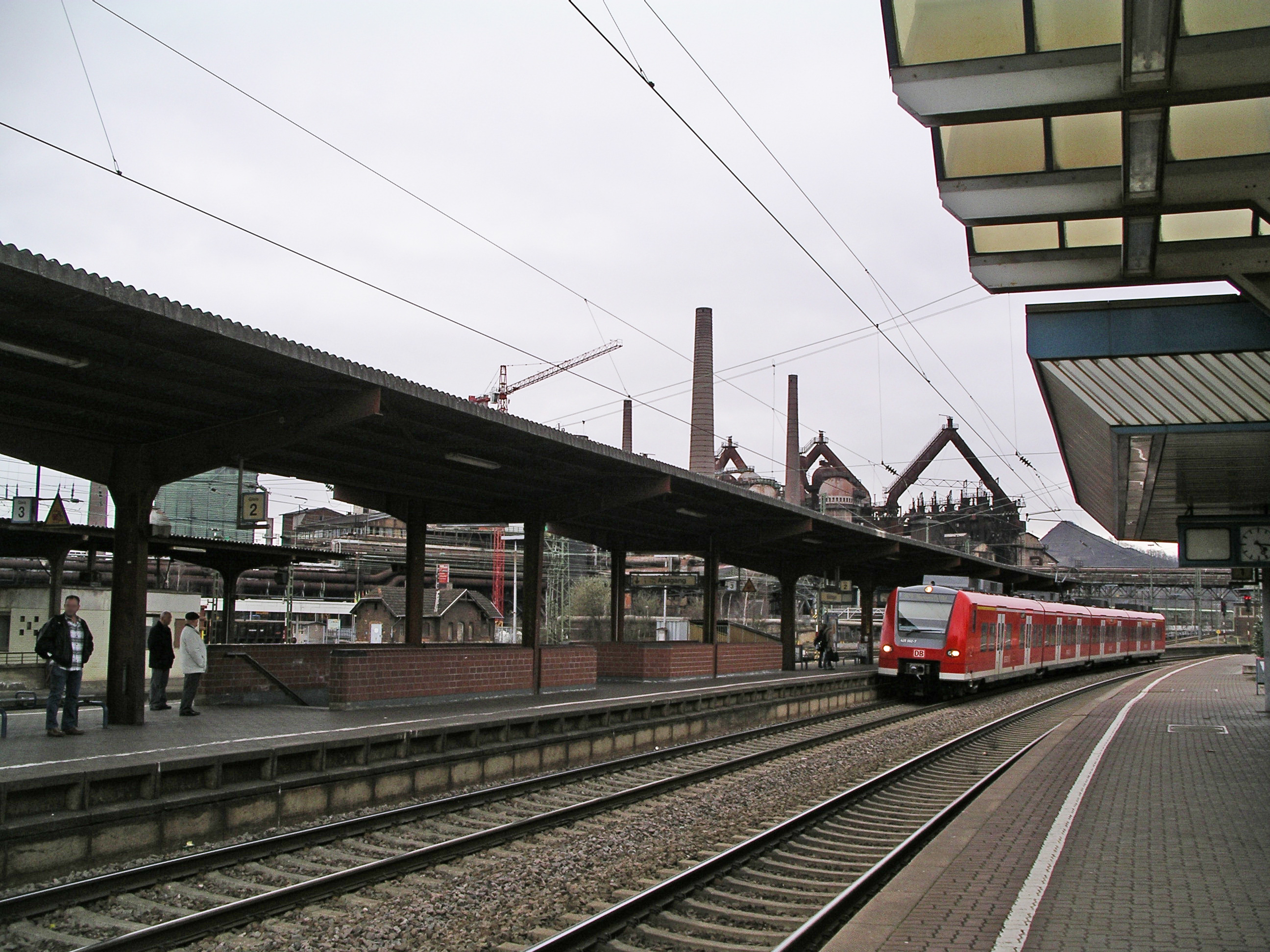

General information
- Location: Rathausstr. 55, Völklingen, Saarland; Germany
- Coordinates: 49°14′56″N 6°50′57″E
- Lines: Saar Railway (KBS 685); Völklingen-Heidstock–Püttlingen Grube; Völklingen–Thionville; Lebach–Völklingen
- Platforms: 3 (formerly 5)

Construction
- Accessible: Yes

Other information
- Station code: 6445
- DS100 code: SVL
- IBNR: 8000175
- Category: 3
- Fare zone: SaarVV: 191
- Website: www.bahnhof.de

Services
| Preceding station | DB Regio Mitte | Following station |
|---|---|---|
| Saarlouis Hbf towards Koblenz Hbf | RE 1 Südwest-Express | Saarbrücken Hbf towards Heidelberg Hbf |
| Bous (Saar) towards Merzig (Saar) | RB 70 | Luisenthal (Saar) towards Kaiserslautern Hbf |
| Bous (Saar) towards Schweich DB | RB 71 | Luisenthal (Saar) towards Kaiserslautern Hbf |
Location

Völklingen station is the main railway station in the city of Völklingen in the German state of Saarland. It is now only served by passenger trains on the Saar line (German: Saarstrecke) between Trier and Saarbrücken.

== Location ==
The station is located south-west of central Völklingens on the southern ring road. To the west lies the World Heritage Site of the former Völklingen Ironworks, which was formerly connected by sidings to the station’s yard.

== History ==
The station was built during the construction of the Saar line, which was opened from Saarbrücken to Merzig on 16 December 1858. In 1860, the first station building was built, which was located to the east of the present building. In the Franco-Prussian War, the station was a target of French artillery fire, which led to the closure of rail operations. In 1872, a branch line was built to the Grube Viktoria (a colliery named after Victoria, Princess Royal) in Püttlingen branching off the Saar line to the east of the station. The Völklingen–Thionville railway was opened in 1880. In 1893 the station had become too small and the current Alten Bahnhof ("old station") was built. The line to Püttlingen was extended to Lebach in 1911. This line was closed in 1985 and today the section in Völklingen is used as a bike path. In the heyday of the nearby Völklingen Ironworks, the station served as an important transportation hub for steel workers and raw materials. From the mid-1960s the Saar line was electrified. The new station building adjacent to the existing building was opened in 1992 after a new building had been under discussion since 1975. The old station was heritage listed. Until 2002, Völklingen was served by InterRegio trains; it has since only been served by regional traffic.

From 1909 to 1959, the Völklingen Tramway (Straßenbahn Völklingen) also ran to the station.

== Infrastructure ==
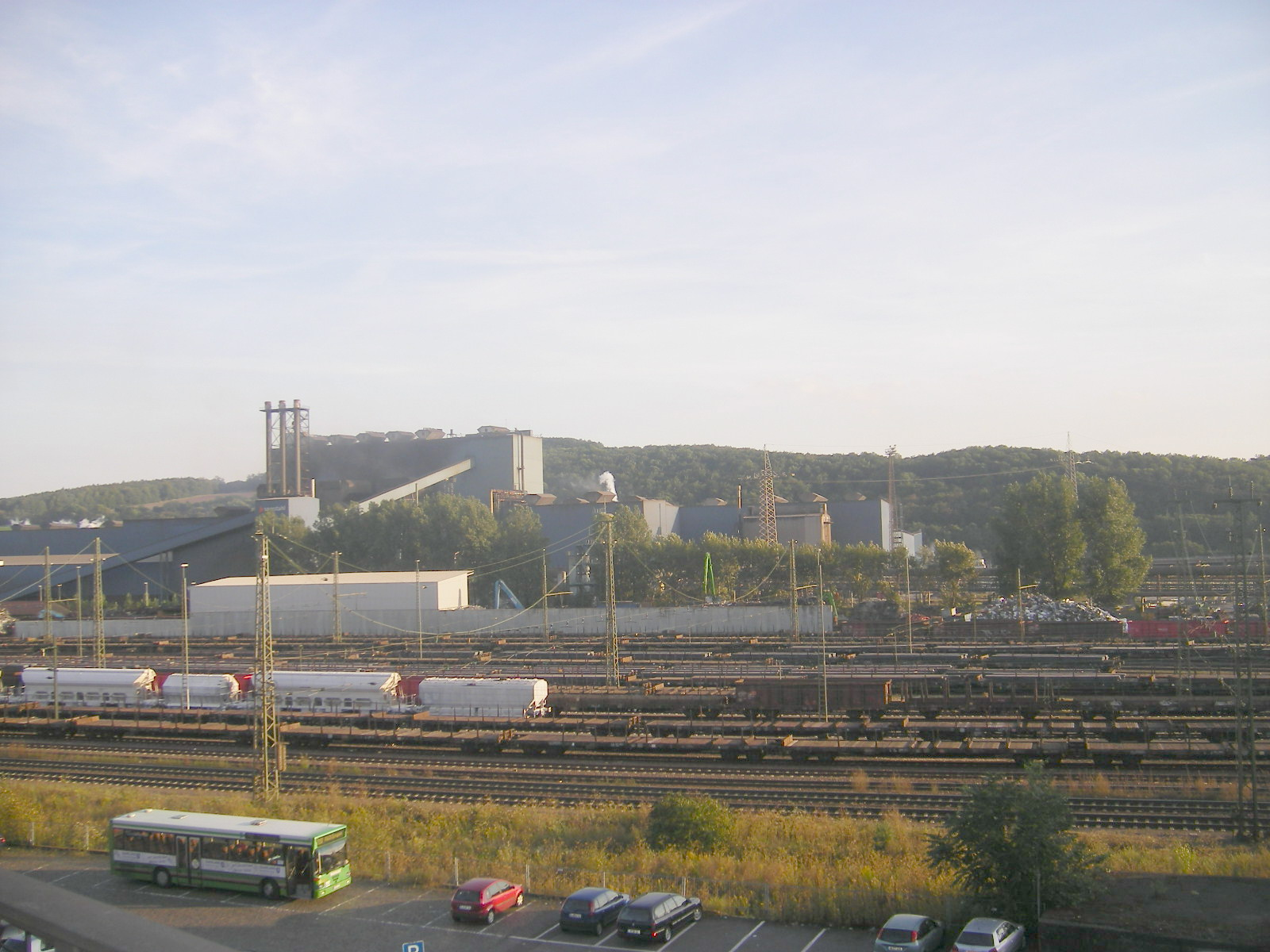
Track field in Völklingen

The station has three platform tracks and some freight tracks for trains running to the Völklingen steel mill. Barrier-free access existed only to platform 1. Platforms tracks 2 and 3 are only accessible via a pedestrian tunnel with stairs.

Völklingen has a push-button interlocking, which went into service in 1964. It controls signals and points in Luisenthal, Bous and Ensdorf remotely.

=== Heritage listing of old station ===
The old station building, which was built in 1893–94, is equipped with a pedestrian tunnel under the tracks and facilities and an entrance hall built in the 1950s; these are heritage listed. The tripartite building was built of brick faced masonry on large sandstone plinths. In 1997, the Saarland State Development Corporation (Landesentwicklungsgesellschaft Saarland, LEG Saar), acquired the 1600 square-metre station building and modernised it for €2.9 million, partly funded by the state, the Federal Republic of Germany and the European Union. It is intended to host a multimedia exhibition called Eingangstor (gateway) leading to the Völklingen Ironworks World Heritage Site. The ceiling beams and medallions with territorial coats of arms mounted on the wall in 1893 have been restored. Since 1998, it has housed a theatre and a cinema, a tourist information centre for the city of Völklingen and a restaurant. Since 2002, it has also housed an IT training centre of the community college of Völklingen.

=== Freight yard ===
The passenger station is located in the middle of extensive railway tracks, used by freight traffic for the nearby iron and steel plants. In 1970, Völklingen was the destination of the heaviest freight trains operated by Deutsche Bundesbahn. South-west of the tracks is a building of the freight yard with a hipped roof with gables on both sides of a side projection. The train controller’s building of Völklingen station, built in 1900, is part of the ensemble of the Völklingen pig iron production facilities that form the World Heritage Site.

== Rail services ==
The station is classified by Deutsche Bahn as a category 4 station and its fares are regulated by the Saarländischen Verkehrsverbund (Saarland Transport Association). The station is in German fare zone 191, which covers the entire metropolitan area of Völklingen. The station is now only served by regional trains:

| Line | Name | Route | Frequency |
|---|---|---|---|
| RE 1 | Mosel-Saar-Express | Koblenz – Cochem – Wittlich – Trier – Saarburg – Merzig (Saar) – Dillingen – Saarlouis – Völklingen – Saarbrücken | 120 min |
| RB 70 | Saartal-Bahn | Merzig (Saar) – Beckingen (Saar) – Dillingen (Saar) – Saarlouis – Völklingen – Saarbrücken Hbf – St. Ingbert – Homburg (Saar) Hbf – Landstuhl – Kaiserslautern Hbf | 60 min |
| RB 71 | Saartal-Bahn | Trier Hbf – Saarburg – Merzig (Saar) – Beckingen (Saar) – Dillingen (Saar) – Saarlouis Hbf – Völklingen – Saarbrücken Hbf – Homburg (Saar) Hbf | 60 min |

Outside the station, there is a bus station with bus connections to all parts of Völklingen, to France and to Lebach, Püttlingen and Überherrn.
