= Saar Railway =

Railway in Germany

Saar Line

Overview
- Native name: Saarstrecke
- Line number: 3230
- Locale: Saarland, Germany
- Termini: Saarbrücken; Karthaus

Service
- Route number: 685

Technical
- Line length: 88 km (55 mi)
- Track gauge: 1,435 mm (4 ft 8 1/2 in) standard gauge
- Electrification: 15 kV/16.7 Hz AC overhead catenary
- Operating speed: 110 km/h (68 mph) (max)

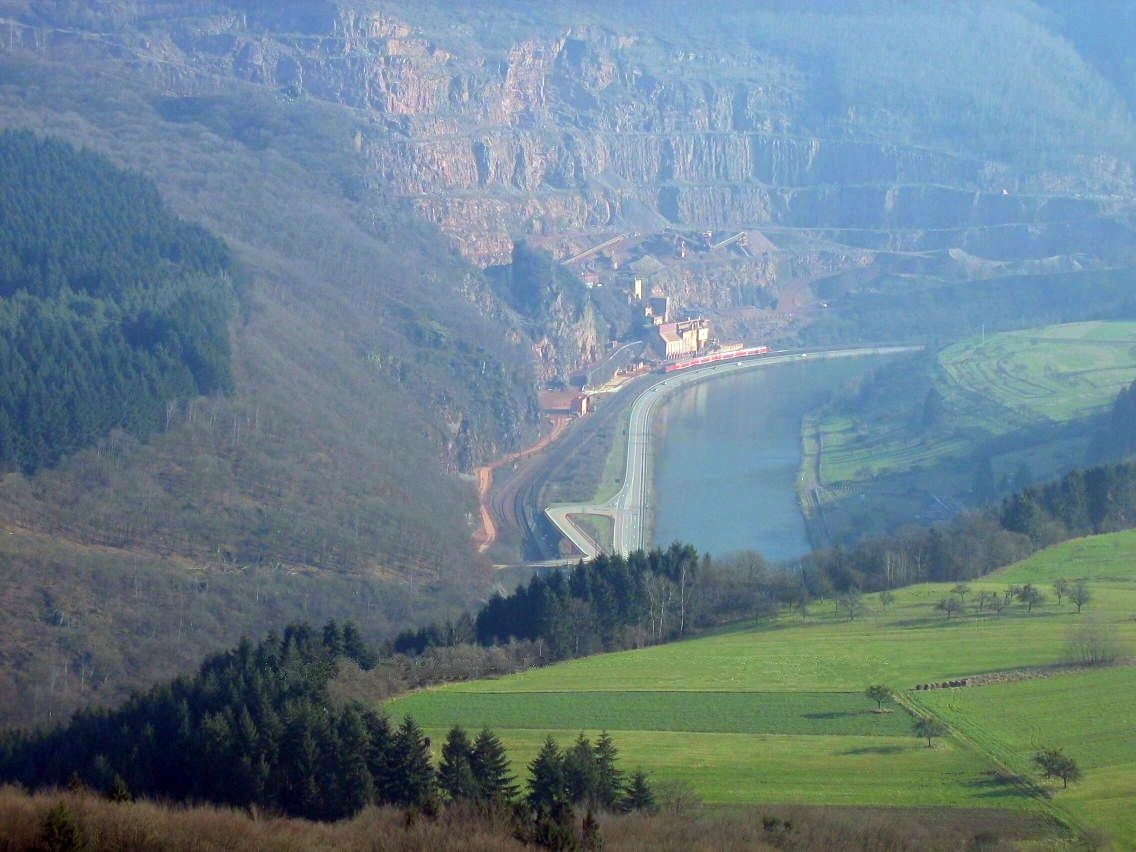
Regional Express with double-deck carriages next to a large granite quarry in the Saar Valley in Taben-Rodt

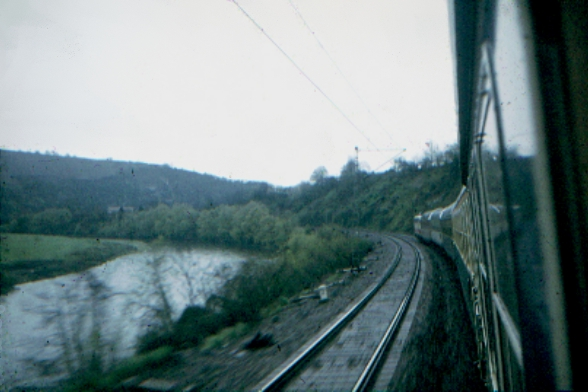
D-train (express) in Saar Valley near Mettlach

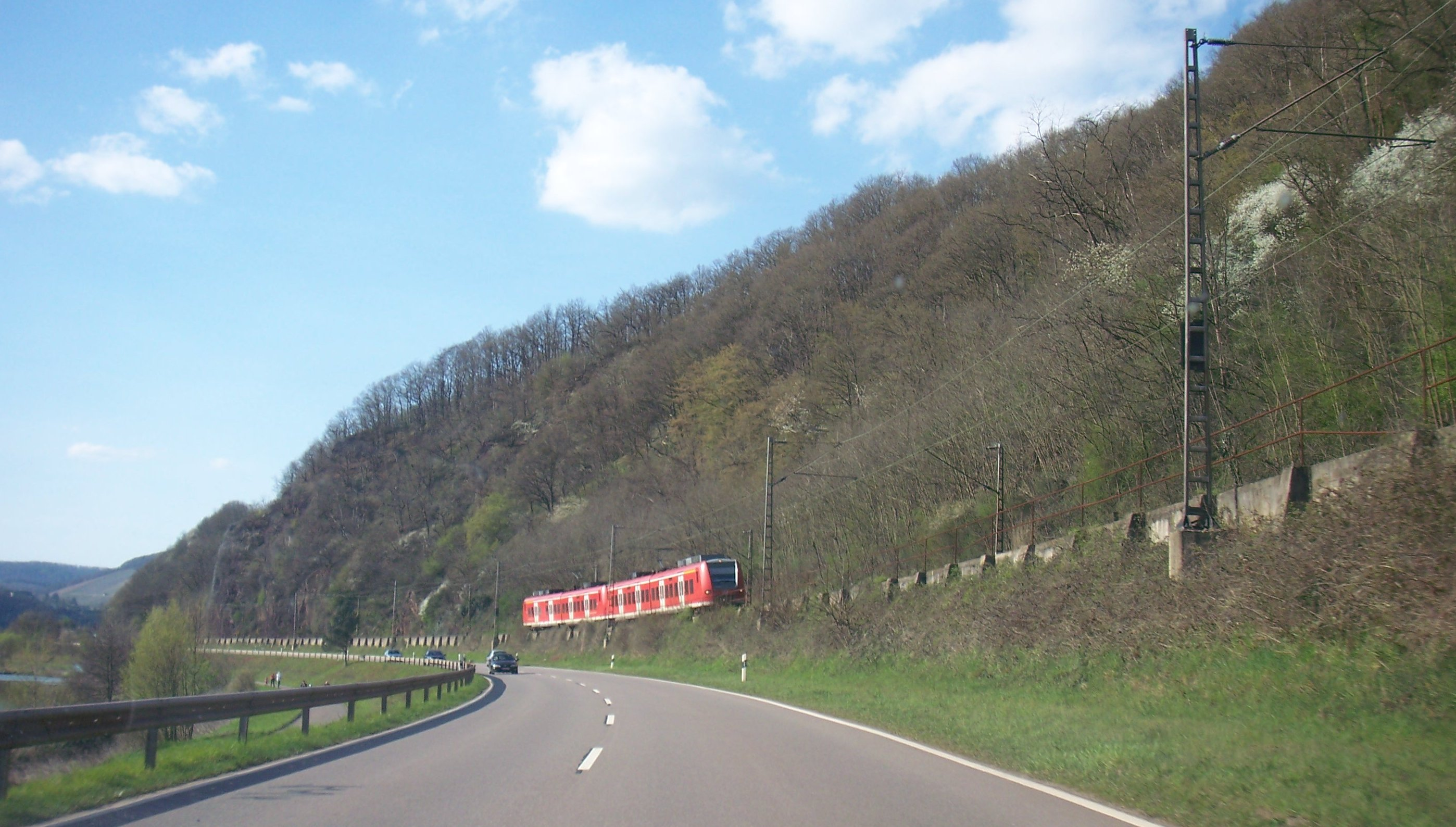
An RE train on the Saar line between Saarburg and Serrig

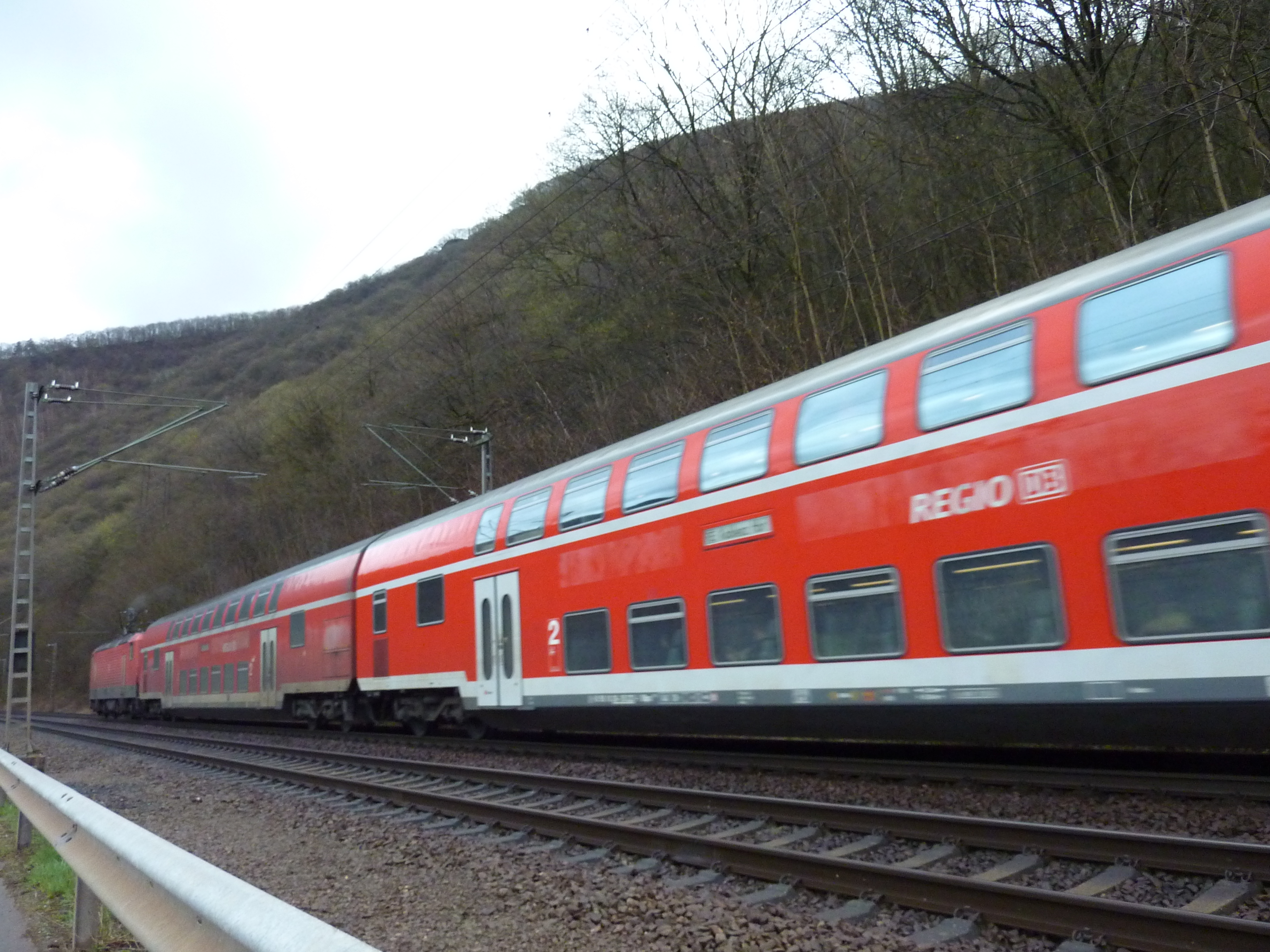
A double-deck train on the Saar line

The Saarbrücken–Trier railway, known in German as the Saarstrecke (literally the "Saar line") in the German states of Rhineland-Palatinate and Saarland. It connects Saarbrücken and Trier. It was opened in 1858 and 1860 and is one of the oldest railways in Germany.

== Route ==
From Saarbrücken the Saar line was opened along the Saar Valley to Merzig on 16 December 1858 and to Trier West on the left bank of the Moselle on 26 May 1860. The track stays on the right bank of the Saar and follows its many loops; as a result some of its 99 curves have very tight radii. Only one of the Saar loops, between Mettlach and Besseringen, is shortened by a tunnel.

From Trier the line continues as the Eifel Railway to Cologne and Mosel line to Koblenz. The line was built by the Royal Administration of the Saarbrücken Railway (Königliche Direction der Saarbrücker Eisenbahn), the first railway owned and operated by the Prussian government.

== History ==
The purpose of the 88 km long route was to connect the industries of Trier, Mettlach (pottery), Völklingen (mining), Saarbrücken and the Saar region (mining and related industries) to the Ruhr and the North Sea ports. Contemporary sources described the line as 12.051 Prussian miles (each 7,532.5 metres) long with a projected construction cost of 5.6 million thalers. At the end of 1859 the first railway reached Trier, although passengers had to use a horse-drawn carriage from Ponten (a district of Besseringen) over the mountain to Mettlach, since the tunnel was not yet complete.

The Saar line from the beginning was used by passenger and heavy freight trains.

From 1 April 1881, the line was part of the Königlichen Eisenbahn-Direction (linksrheinisch) in Köln ("Royal Railway Administration (left Rhine) in Cologne") of the Prussian state railways.

Drastic change came at the end of the First World War. The greater part of the Saar line was controlled by the newly created French administration of the Saarland. The section south of Mettlach was taken over by the new Railways of the Saarland (Eisenbahnen des Saargebietes, SAAR) and the northern section was operated by the newly created Deutsche Reichsbahn (German State Railways). Following the reincorporation of the Saarland into Germany in 1935, the whole line was incorporated in the Saarbrücken Railway Administration (Reichsbahndirektion Saarbrücken).

=== Post-war period ===
Following the end of the Second World War in 1945, the Saar line was again divided in 1947. The section south of Saarhölzbach was now under the French controlled Railways of the Saarland (Eisenbahnen des Saarlandes, EdS), the northern section was first part of the Union of Southwest German Railways (Betriebsvereinigung der Südwestdeutschen Eisenbahnen, SWDE), which became part of Deutsche Bundesbahn (German Federal Railway) in 1951. With the inclusion of the Saarland in West Germany in 1957, the whole line became part of Deutsche Bundesbahn. But the stop for customs at Saarhölzbach was only abolished in 1959.

=== Electrification ===
Despite the strong mineral traffic, the Saar line was not one of the first lines of Deutsche Bundesbahn to be electrified. Electrification was first extended to Merzig and later to Saarhölzbach. Only in 1974 was the electrification completed to Trier and Koblenz. It is electrified at the standard German system of 15 kV, 16.7 Hz. It was proposed in the 1950s to electrify the lines of the Saar with the modern French electrification system of 25 kV, 50 Hz. Instead it was decided to canalise the Moselle between France and Germany.

== Operations ==
Apart from heavy iron ore trains from the North Sea ports to the Dillinger Hütte steel works and the other steel works in the Saarland, rail freight on the line used to be dominated by trains carrying coal from the Saar's mines.

=== Long distance services ===
In addition to regional passenger services, the line used to have long-distance express ("D-train", D-Zug, short for Durchgangszug, literally “corridor train”) services. The D-trains ran from Saarbrücken and Trier over the Eifel Railway via Gerolstein or over the Moselle line via Koblenz to Cologne. Until the electrification of the Trier–Koblenz line, D-trains ran fairly equally on both routes. Only afterwards was there a clear preference for the Moselle route.

In 1973 three pairs of City-D-trains ran via Koblenz and Cologne to Düsseldorf. These trains were replaced in 1978 by InterCity-Comfort services, which were similar but had no dining car.

The Saar line was included in the InterRegio network, development of which began in 1988. From 1991, there were D-train services at two-hour intervals connecting Saarbrücken, Koblenz, Cologne, Münster, Bremen and Cuxhaven, with a section of these trains running to Greifswald. This was complemented by express trains between Koblenz and Saarbrücken at hourly intervals. It was not until 1994, with the completion of the conversion of old rolling stock into the new InterRegio trains, that the D-trains were replaced by InterRegio services. In December 2002, the InterRegio services were all cancelled and the Saarland no longer has any long-distance connections.

=== Regional services ===
Regional services has always played a large role on the Saar line, with trains between Saarbrücken and Saarhölzbach being denser than on the northern section towards Trier. Already in 1989 City-Bahn Saar services operated on the line. This was an hourly service from Saarhölzbach (some starting in Trier) via Merzig, Saarlouis, Völklingen and Saarbrücken to Homburg. These services were reinforced every two-hour by express trains running from Merzig via Saarbrücken to Kaiserslautern, which only stopped on the Saar line in Dillingen, Saarlouis, Völklingen, although some also stopped in Beckingen and Bous. In 1995, the City-Bahn were rebranded as Stadt-Express services, which in 1998 was replaced by Regionalbahn (RB) and Regional-Express (RE) services.

In 1996 it was planned to replace the electrically hauled RE trains from Saarbrücken to Koblenz with diesel tilting trains from Saarbrücken via Trier to Cologne on the Eifel Railway. This project failed because of technical problems, so that RE services continue to run between Saarbrücken and Koblenz (Mosel-Saar-Express) with double-deck carriages. These connect in Trier with trains to Cologne. The Mosel-Saar-Express services runs every two hours and together with the RE 11 (Trier–Saarbrücken–Homburg (–Kaiserslautern)) services provide an hourly service on the Saar line.

In addition, RB line 71 services run from Trier via Merzig, Dillingen, Saarlouis, Saarbrücken, St. Ingbert, to Homburg. These services run hourly with S-Bahn-like railcars of class 425 and 426. Extra RB 71 services run between Dillingen and St. Ingbert to provide a 30-minute interval service.
