= Fraulautern =

- Stadtteil of Saarlouis
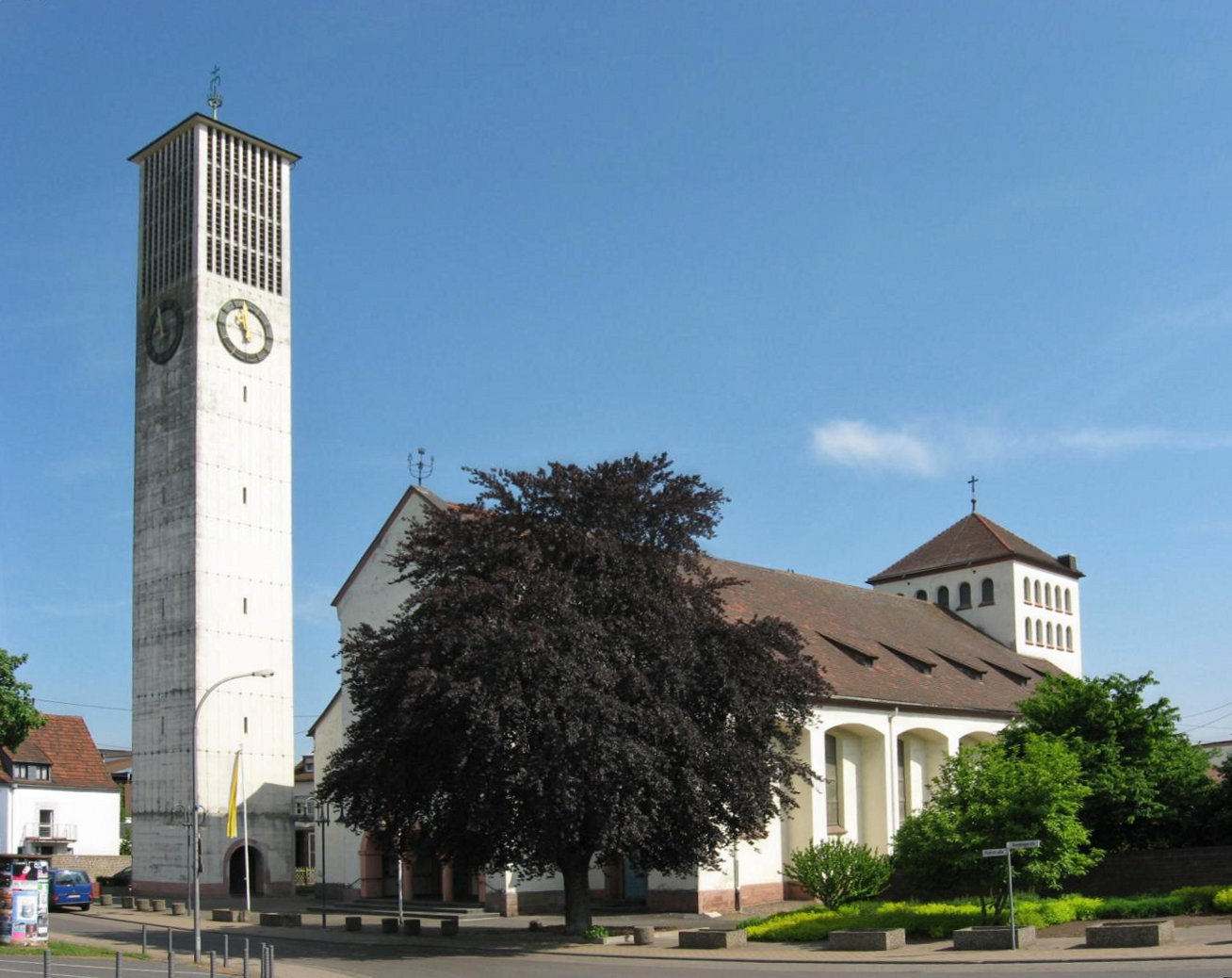
- The Dreifaltigkeitskirche Church

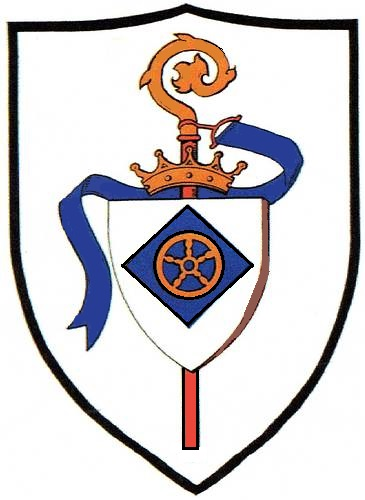
- Coat of arms
- Interactive map of Fraulautern
- Location within Germany Location within Saarland
- Country: Germany
- State: Saarland
- District: Saarlouis
- Town: Saarlouis

Population (2017)
  - Total: 7,000
- Time zone: UTC+01:00 (CET)
  - Summer (DST): UTC+02:00 (CEST)
- Postal codes: 66740
- Dialling codes: 06831
- Vehicle registration: SLS
- Website: www.fraulautern.net

Fraulautern is a district of Saarlouis in the Saarland region of Germany. In 1936, the village of Fraulautern was incorporated into the city of Saarlouis. It is also the source of the alternative name for Saarlouis, Saarlautern. Fraulautern has approximately 7000 inhabitants.

== Location ==
Although the city of Saarlouis proper is situated on the left side of the Saar, the district of Fraulautern (along with the districts of Roden and Steinrausch) are found on the river's right bank. Fraulautern borders the former coal-mining facility of the neighboring community of Ensdorf.

== History ==
Since the middle of the 12th century, a place known as "Lutrea Wilrea" was recorded as being the home of a settlement of either cannons or monks. From this settlement arose the Fraulautern Abbey, a Stift made up of noble Augustinian nuns.

The name "Fraulautern" comes from both the inhabitants of the cloister as well as the celtic word "Lutra" meaning "swampy stream" - a reference here to Fraulautern's location at the junction of the Fraulautern Bach into the Saar.

The first seal of the cloister bore the symbol of the Holy Trinity – the patron saint of the cloister. From 1581, the cloister belonged to the Duchy of Lorraine, however, the town successfully contended for Imperial immediacy in the Holy Roman Empire before the Reichskammergericht on account of its holdings in Schwarzenholz. Between 1795 and 1815, it was part of the Département Moselle (Canton of Saarlouis).

In 1540, the present-day Appollonia-Kapelle was consecrated as a parish church. In 1814, however, the cloister church from 1739 took over the parish church function. The decision to build a new parish church occurred in 1884 followed eventually by the laying of the cornerstone in 1893 and the consecration of the new building in 1895.

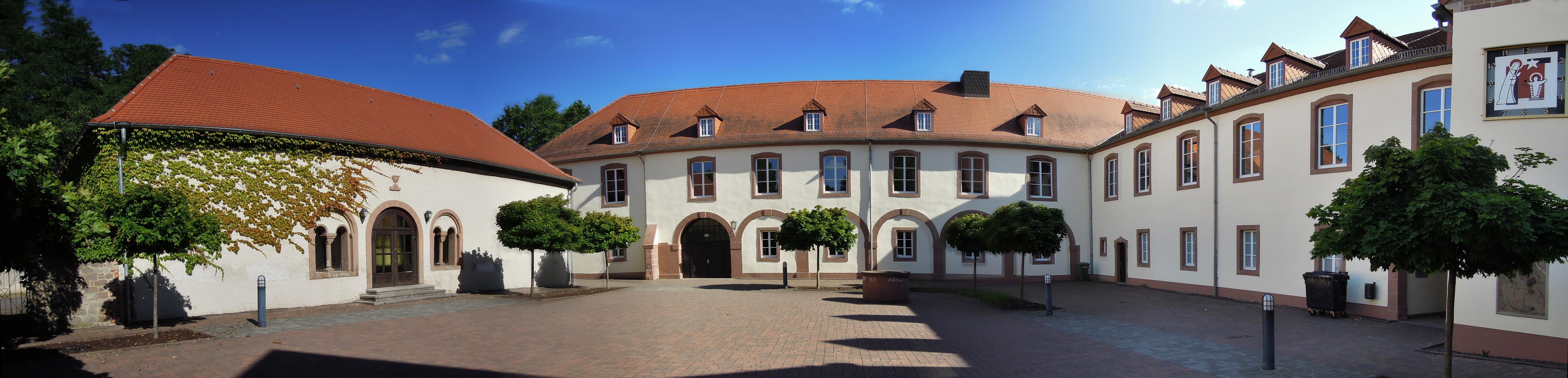
Former Fraulautern Abbey

The first train station within the boundaries of present-day Saarlouis was opened in Fraulautern on December 16, 1858 in the course of the construction of the Saar Railway. The move of the Saarlouis Central Train Station to its present location in Roden occurred on December 19, 1912.

On December 1, 1944, air raids destroyed large portions of Fraulautern, including the parish church and the Apollonia-Kapelle. After the cornerstone was laid for current church, the Church of the Holiest Trinity, was consecrated on November 16, 1960 by auxiliary bishop Bernhard Stein.

== Local Dialect ==
The local dialect in Saarlouis belongs to the Moselle Franconian/Saarlandish group of dialects.

== Sources ==
- Fraulautern: Historie (in German)
