= Landstuhl station =

Railway station in Rhineland-Palatinate, Germany

Landstuhl
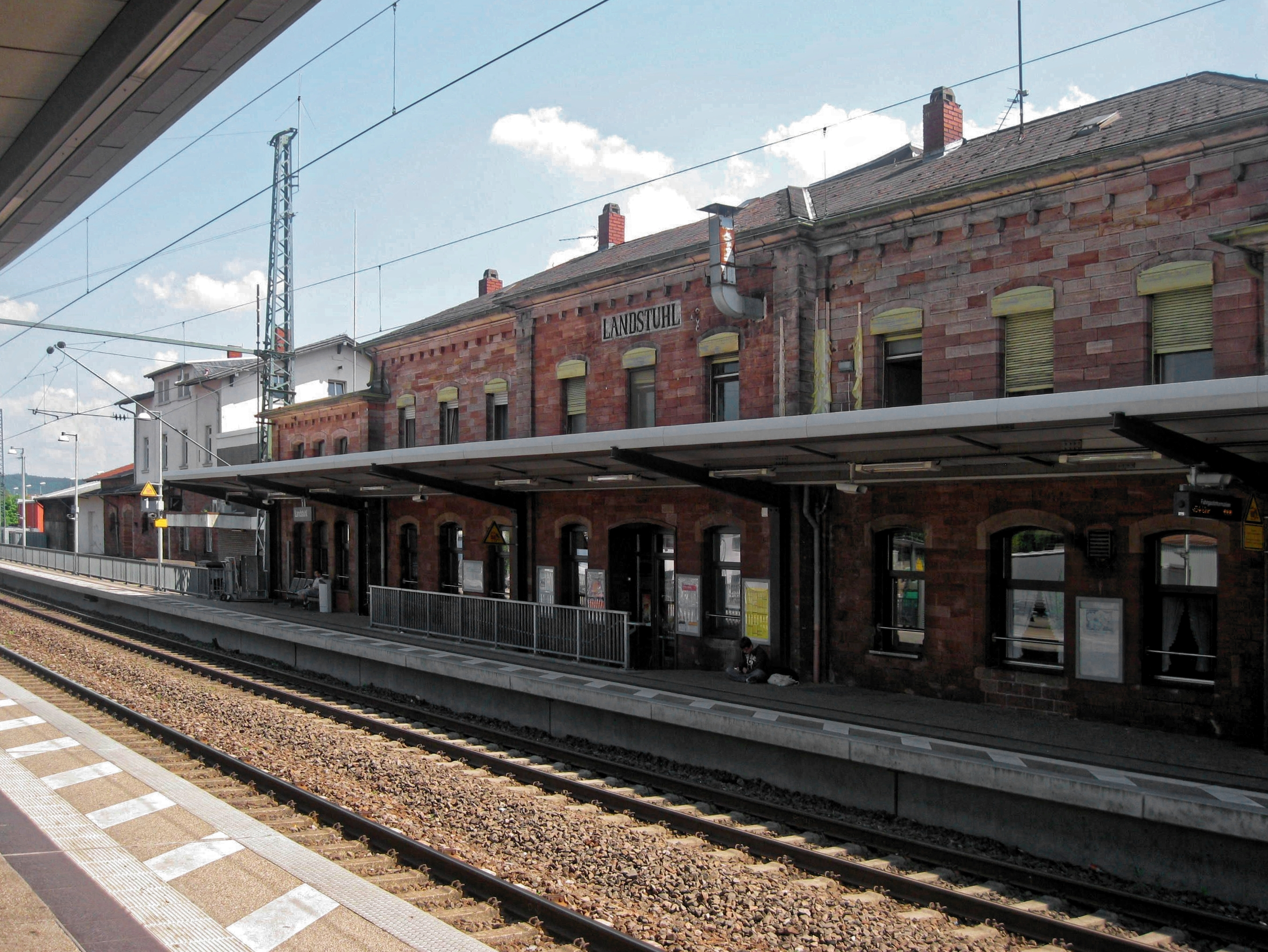

General information
- Location: Bahnstr. 1, Landstuhl, Rhineland-Palatinate; Germany
- Coordinates: 49°24′59″N 7°33′58″E
- Lines: Mannheim–Saarbrücken railway (KBS 670, km 28.4); Landstuhl–Kusel (KBS 671, km –0.1)
- Platforms: 3

Construction
- Accessible: Yes

Other information
- Station code: 3515
- DS100 code: SLD
- IBNR: 8003515
- Category: 3
- Fare zone: VRN: 844
- Website: www.bahnhof.de

History
- Opened: 1 July 1848

Services
Preceding station	DB Fernverkehr	Following station
Homburg (Saar) Hbf towards Saarbrücken Hbf	ICE 60 one way to Munich	Kaiserslautern Hbf towards München Hbf
Location

Landstuhl station is a station in the town of Landstuhl in the German state of Rhineland-Palatinate. Deutsche Bahn classifies it as belonging to station category 3 and has three platforms tracks. The station is located in the network of the Verkehrsverbund Rhein-Neckar (VRN) and belongs to fare zone 844.

It is located on the Mannheim–Saarbrücken railway, which essentially consists of the Palatine Ludwig Railway (Pfälzische Ludwigsbahn), Ludwigshafen–Bexbach. It was opened on 1 July 1848 with the Kaiserslautern–Homburg section of the Palatine Ludwig Railway. The station became a junction station with the opening of the Landstuhl–Kusel railway on 20 September 1868. It has also been served by line S1 of the Rhine-Neckar S-Bahn since December 2006.

== Location ==
The station is located on the north-western outskirts of Landstuhl. Bahnstraße (station street) runs to the south parallel to the tracks. To the north is an industrial area. The western part of the station is bridged by state route 363.

=== Railways ===
The Mannheim–Saarbrücken railway runs straight to the station in the east-west direction. Immediately afterwards, it turns slightly to the west-southwest. The Landstuhl–Kusel railway branches off in the west and turns on a broad curve almost at a right angle to the north.

== History ==
=== Origin of the station and first years (1830–1860) ===
Originally, it had been planned to build a railway orientated north-south within the then Circle of the Rhine (Rheinkreis). However, it was agreed to first build a highway in the east-west direction, which was to be used primarily for transporting coal from Saar area to the Rhine. The line ran from Bexbach to the west via Landstuhl and Kaiserslautern to Rheinschanze. The plan of 1839 provided for a station at Sickingenstadt. 730 gulden had to be paid for the acquisition of land in the town.

Due to the difficult terrain of the Palatinate Forest (Pfälzerwald), which had to be crossed between Neustadt and Kaiserslautern, the Palatine Ludwig Railway does not continuously run from east to west. After the line had been opened between Neustadt and Ludwigshafen in 1847, the section between Kaiserslautern and Homburg—including Landstuhl station—was put into operation on 1 July 1848; provisional services ran from 10 to 15 July 1848. At the end of the year, the section was extended to Frankenstein and in June of the following year it was possible to run in the west to Bexbach. On 25 August 1849, the Ludwig Railway was finally operable along its entire length.

=== Planning, construction and opening of the Landstuhl–Kusel railway (1860–1870) ===
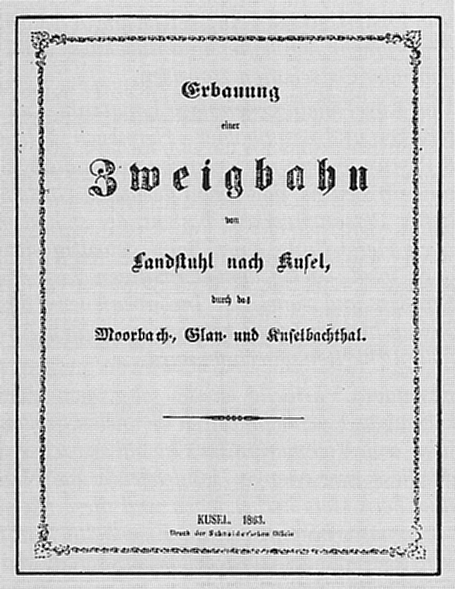
Title page of memorandum for the construction of the line in 1863

According to a memorandum published in Kusel in 1861, the line would run from the Palatine Ludwig Railway through Mohrbach, Glan and Kuselbach to Kusel.

The first freight train ran on 28 August 1868. The Landstuhl–Kusel railway was officially opened on 20 September 1868. On that day, a special train ran from Ludwigshafen to Kusel, carrying officials of the Palatine Railway and among others the Bavarian Minister of State for Commerce and Public Works, Gustav von Schlör. Two days later the line was released for regular operations. Thus, Landstuhl station became the seventh railway junction within the Palatinate after Schifferstadt (1847), Ludwigshafen (1853), Neustadt an der Haardt (1855), Homburg (1857), Winden (1864) and Schwarzenacker station (1866).

=== Further development ===
In 1922, the station was integrated into the newly founded Reichsbahndirektion Ludwigshafen (railway division of Ludwigshafen). After its dissolution, it came under the jurisdiction of the railway division of Saarbrücken as of 1 April 1937.

The trunk line from Mannheim to Saarbrücken has always been of great importance for long-distance traffic and it was gradually electrified starting in 1960. The Saarbrücken–Homburg section could be operated electrically on 8 March 1960. The Homburg–Kaiserslautern section—including Landstuhl station—followed on 18 May 1961 and the line could be electrically operated along its entire length from 12 March 1964.

During the gradual dissolution of the Mainz railway division in the early 1970s, its counterpart in Saarbrücken again became responsible for the station.

=== Recent past (since 1994) ===
In the course of the integration of the Mannheim–Saarbrücken railway in the Rhine-Neckar S-Bahn, the station’s platform were made accessible. The S-Bahn was extended from Kaiserslautern Hbf to Homburg (Saar) Hbf at the timetable change on 10 December 2006. As part of the upgrade of the line, the station was modernised by the end of 2019.

== Infrastructure ==
=== Entrance building ===
The entrance building had already been completed at the end of April 1846, two years before the opening of the station.Like many entrance buildings built on the Palatine Ludwig Railway at that time (some of which have been replaced), it is built in an Italian style of architecture.

=== Platforms ===
The platforms were modernised for part of their length as part of the integration of the station into the network of the Rhine-Neckar S-Bahn. The S-Bahn trains have an entrance height of 76 centimetres, while the diesel multiple units running to and from Kusel have a height of 55 centimetres. There are three different entry heights on platform 2.

Platforms
Track	Usable length	Platform height	Current usage
1	229 m	76 cm	Services towards Kaiserslautern/Mannheim/Heidelberg/Osterburken
2	190 m	76 cm	Services towards Homburg/Saarbrücken/Trier/Koblenz
3	191 m	55 cm	Services to and from Kusel and Kaiserslautern (RB 67)

In addition to the three platform tracks, there is also track 4. This is today slightly overgrown, but can still serve as a siding for regional trains.

== Services ==
=== Passengers ===
The first timetable shows three services between Homburg and Kaiserslautern. Already six months later, they continued to Frankenstein. In 1884 there were continuous connections of the Neunkirchen–Homburg–Landstuhl-Kaiserslautern–Schifferstadt–Ludwigshafen–Worms route.

In 1868, services between Landstuhl and Kusel were operated with two mixed (passengers and goods) trains and two passenger only trains. At the same time, a train ran four times between Landstuhl and Kusel. In 1905, 89,199 tickets were sold at the station. At least ten pairs of trains have always run between Landstuhl and Kusel each day since the 1950s. From the beginning of the 1950s onwards, a so-called Städteschnellzug (city rapid train) between Kusel and Heidelberg ran in the morning. As early as 1954, it was downgraded to an Eilzug (regional fast train). In 1979, it was discontinued.

From April to October there has been a service between Kusel and Neustadt on Sundays and public holidays running as the Glantal-Express. Between Landstuhl and Neustadt, it stops only in Kaiserslautern, Weidenthal and Lambrecht (Pfalz).

The trains on the line to Kusel usually run to and from Kaiserslautern and only a few start or end in Landstuhl. Since December 2006, regular S-Bahn services on line S1 run from Homburg via Kaiserslautern, Neustadt, Mannheim, Heidelberg, and Mosbach to Osterburken. Also, one daily Intercity service stop in Landstuhl.

In the 2026 timetable, the following services stop at the station.

Line	Route	Interval
ICE 60	Saarbrücken – Landstuhl – Kaiserslautern – Mannheim – Stuttgart – Ulm – Augsburg – Munich	1 train to Munich
S1	Homburg – Landstuhl – Kaiserslautern – Hochspeyer – Neustadt – Mannheim – Heidelberg – Eberbach – Mosbach – Osterburken	Hourly
RE 1	Koblenz – Trier – Saarbrücken – St. Ingbert – Homburg – Landstuhl – Kaiserslautern	Hourly
RB 67	Kusel – Altenglan – Glan-Münchweiler – Landstuhl – Kaiserslautern	Hourly (+ peak services)
RB 70	Merzig – Dillingen – Saarbrücken– Homburg – Landstuhl – Kaiserslautern	Hourly

=== Freight operations ===
In the first decades, the station had extensive freight operations. This was reflected in the track layout. The northern and southeastern station areas served the loading of coal. There was a long loading ramp southwest of today's entrance building.

In 1905, a total of 83,533.23 tonnes of goods were despatched from or received at the station. Shortly after the exit of the line to Kusel, a siding from the municipal refinery warehouse, which was a large building, remained until the 1990s. Meanwhile, local freight transport has become less important.

== Sources ==
=== References ===
- Emich, Hans-Joachim; Becker, Rolf (1996). Die Eisenbahnen an Glan und Lauter [The railways on the Glan and the Lauter] (in German).
- Engbarth, Fritz (2007). Von der Ludwigsbahn zum Integralen Taktfahrplan – 160 Jahre Eisenbahn in der Pfalz [From the Ludwig Railway to the Integral Timetable—160 years of Railways in the Palatinate] (in German).
- Sturm, Heinz (2005). Die pfälzischen Eisenbahnen [The Palatine Railways] (in German). Ludwigshafen am Rhein: pro MESSAGE. ISBN 3-934845-26-6.
