= Wittlich Hauptbahnhof =

Railway station in Wittlich, Germany

Wittlich Hbf
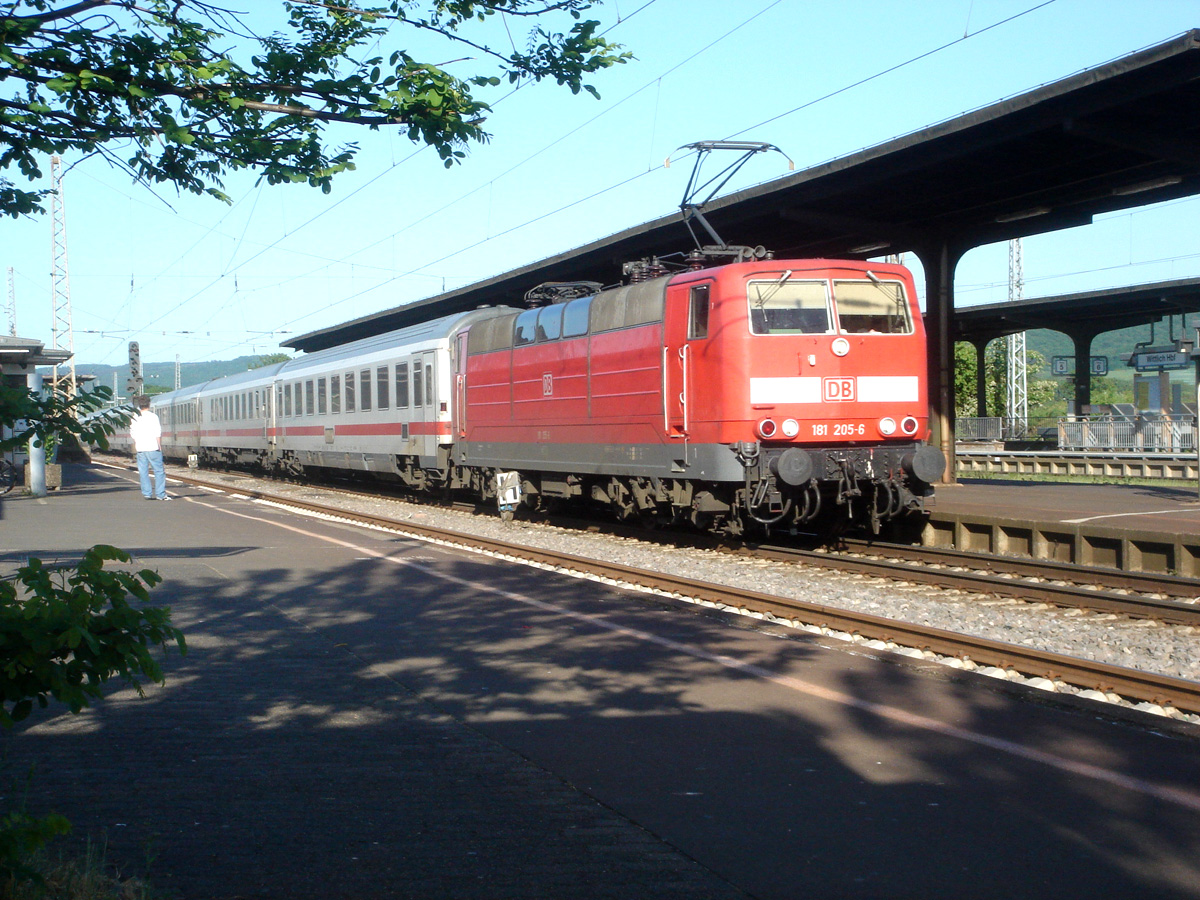
- Intercity 432 to Luxemburg in Wittlich Hbf

General information
- Location: Wittlich, Rhineland-Palatinate; Germany
- Coordinates: 49°58′23″N 6°56′37″E
- Lines: Moselle line; formerly Wengerohr–Daun; formerly Wengerohr–Bernkastel-Kues
- Platforms: 5

Construction
- Accessible: Yes

Other information
- Station code: n/a
- DS100 code: SWIH
- Category: 3
- Fare zone: VRT: 301
- Website: www.bahnhof.de

History
- Opened: 1879
Location

Wittlich Hauptbahnhof is a railway station for the town of Wittlich in the German state of Rhineland-Palatinate and is on the Koblenz–Trier line (Moselle line). Until the closure of the Wengerohr–Daun and Wengerohr–Bernkastel-Kues lines, it was a junction station and a regional rail node. Today it is the only station in Wittlich.

The station is located in the district of Wengerohr and the station was called Wengerohr station until 27 September 1987.

== History ==
The Moselle line from Koblenz to Trier was built between 1874 and 1879. Due to the extensive meandering of the middle Moselle, the line left the Moselle valley at Pünderich and was then built on a relatively straight route through the Wittlich Depression to Trier. Wengerohr station was opened on the line in the formerly independent town of Wengerohr when the Moselle line was built.

With the line away from the Moselle, many wine-growing towns were not connected to the rail network. Thus, in the following years, branch lines were built to some of these towns. In 1883, the branch line from Wengerohr station to Bernkastel-Kues was completed. This followed the course of the Lieser to meet the Moselle in the village of Lieser.

In order to connect Wittlich to the rail network, another branch line was built from Wengerohr station shortly later and opened on 11 April 1885 together with Wittlich station. This branch line was extended 25 years later to Daun. Even after the connection with the Eifel Cross Railway, the traffic on the southern section between Wengerohr and Wittlich was significantly greater than in the rest of the line.

The town of Wengerohr was incorporated as part of Wittlich on 7 June 1969; nevertheless the station was not renamed. Even after the closure of passenger services between Daun and Wittlich on 1 November 1981 and between Wengerohr and Bernkastel-Kues on 2 June 1984, the station retained its importance as a junction on the branch line from the Moselle line to Wittlich. On 27 September 1987, the station’s name was changed to Wittlich Hauptbahnhof, while the former Wittlich station was renamed Wittlich (Stadt) ("Wittlich (town)") station. The rest of the branch to Wittlich (Stadt) station was closed only a year later on 25 September 1988.

== Current situation ==
With the closure of the Wengerohr–Daun line, the stations of Wittlich (Stadt) and Wittlich-Grünewald were also closed. As a result, Wittlich Hauptbahnhof is the only station in the town of Wittlich, although the term Hauptbahnhof should only be used where a town has more than one station.

On 16 January 1995, a centralised traffic control centre at Wittlich station was put into operation, remotely controlling several signal boxes.

== Operations ==
In long-distance passenger transport, the following InterCity service operates from the station (as of 2024), although it operates as a Regional-Express between Koblenz and Trier:

Line	Route	Frequency
IC 37	Düsseldorf – Cologne – Bonn – Koblenz – Wittlich – Trier – Luxembourg	1 train pair

In regional transport, several Regional-Express and Regionalbahn services stop in Wittlich:

Line	Name	Route	Frequency
RE 1	Mosel-Saar-Express	Koblenz – Wittlich – Trier – Saarlouis – Völklingen – Saarbrücken – Homburg (Saar) Hbf – Landstuhl – Kaiserslautern – Neustadt – Ludwigshafen Mitte – Mannheim	Every 2 hours
RE 11	DeLux-Express	Luxembourg – Wasserbillig – Igel – Trier – Wittlich – Cochem – Treis-Karden – Koblenz	Hourly
RB 81	Moseltal-Bahn	Koblenz – Cochem – Wittlich – Trier	Hourly
RB 82	Elbling-Express	Wittlich – Trier – Konz Mitte – Wellen (Mosel) – Perl	Some trains
RB 83	Elbling-Express	Luxembourg – Wasserbillig – Trier – Wittlich	Hourly (Mon–Sat)
