= Trier Hauptbahnhof =

Railway station in Trier, Germany

Trier Hbf
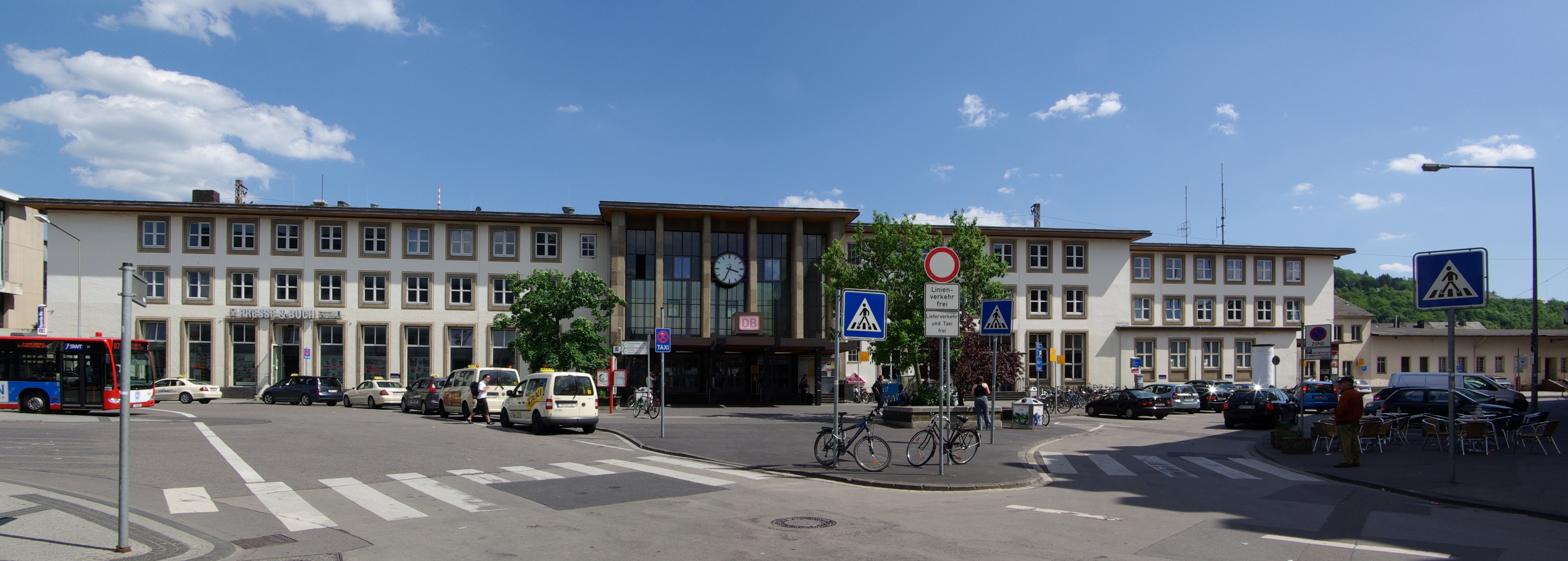
- Station building and forecourt.

General information
- Location: Bahnhofsplatz 1, Trier, Rhineland-Palatinate; Germany
- Coordinates: 49°45′25″N 06°39′07″E
- Lines: Saarbrücken–Trier (KBS 685); Koblenz–Trier (KBS 690); Köln–Trier (KBS 474); Trier–Perl (KBS 692); Trier–Luxembourg (KBS 693)
- Platforms: 5

Construction
- Accessible: Yes

Other information
- Station code: 6264
- DS100 code: STR
- IBNR: 8000134
- Category: 2
- Fare zone: VRT: 1
- Website: www.bahnhof.de

History
- Opened: 1878

Services
Preceding station	DB Regio Mitte	Following station
Konz towards Mannheim Hbf	RE 1 Südwest-Express	Schweich towards Koblenz Hbf
Trier Süd towards Luxembourg	RE 11	Schweich towards Koblenz Hbf
Konz Mitte towards Metz-Ville	RE 16 Limited service	Terminus
Terminus	RB 71	Trier Süd towards Kaiserslautern Hbf
Terminus	RB 81	Pfalzel towards Koblenz Hbf
Trier Süd towards Perl	RB 82	Terminus
Trier Süd towards Luxembourg	RB 83	Pfalzel towards Wittlich Hbf
Preceding station	DB Regio NRW	Following station
Terminus	RE 12 Limited service	Schweich towards Köln Messe/Deutz
Terminus	RB 22	Pfalzel towards Gerolstein
Location

Trier Hauptbahnhof is a railway station for the city of Trier, in the German state of Rhineland-Palatinate. It is a through station, about 500 metres (550 yd) east of the inner city and the Porta Nigra.

== History ==
The station was opened in 1878 together with the rest of the Moselle line, which formed part of the Kanonenbahn (English: Cannons Railway) (Berlin–Metz).

Earlier, upon the opening of the Saar route in 1860, Trier had acquired a station on the left bank of the Moselle, the present day Trier-West station, which, in 1871, had also been linked with Cologne via the Eifel Railway. However, in view of its convenient location close to Trier's city centre, the present day Hauptbahnhof soon became the city's most important station.

== Station facilities ==
=== Building and platforms ===
The main entrance of the station leads directly to the station lobby. In the southwestern part of the lobby, there are a FotoFix automat and two pay phones; in the southern half (with its own access) are luggage lockers, ticket machines, the toilet and the DB travel centre. In the north-west wing is a candy kiosk and in the eastern half an ATM, a bakery / café and a newsagent.

In 2005, renovation work began in the station area with the objective of adapting it to the standard of other ICE-train stations.

- On the platforms, dimpled paving stones suitable for blind travellers have been placed near the platform edges to mark their borders.
- The station building has been renovated and converted into (a new cafe moved in and the newspaper shop was enlarged and moved).
- Elevators were installed to give barrier-free access to the platforms.
- The City Council also decided to redesign and refresh the station district over the next few years.

=== Forecourt and surroundings ===
The station forecourt is overwhelmingly dominated by retail outlets. At the southern end, it is bordered by the Alleencenter shopping centre. An expert workshop organised by the city of Trier has put forward comprehensive plans for the redevelopment of the station forecourt, and in particular for the reorganisation of the parking and traffic control systems. Under these plans, there would be a generally clearly visible station building, with a new bus terminal, and either an overpass or underpass to Trier-Gartenfeld.

=== Road connections ===
Trief Hbf is connected to its west, via the Bahnhofstrasse with the Alleenring, which gathers together all the traffic from the Ost- and Theodor-Heuss-Allee, Christoph- und Balduinstraße, as well as the streets in the Reichsabtei.

The forecourt in front of the main building offers short-term parking and parking for motorcycles. Further parking can be found at the western end of the building and in the parking garage to the south of the Ostalleencenter.

== Traffic ==
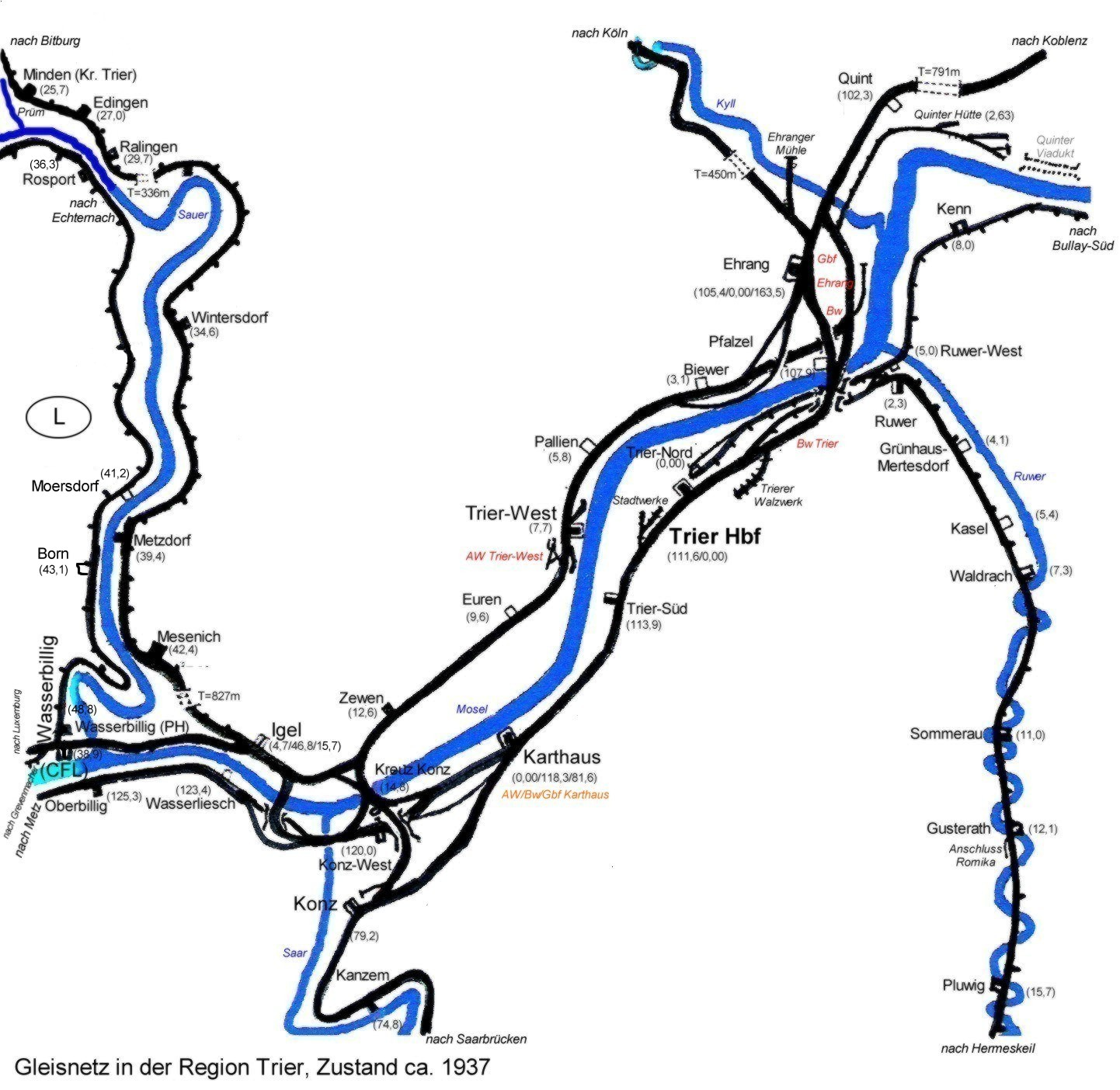
Trier area rail network, 1937

At Trier Hbf, more than 170 trains stop daily. The trains calling at Trier include RE and RB services.

One can arrive in Trier from:

- Köln–Gerolstein via the Eifel Railway (KBS 474);
- Koblenz–Wittlich via the Koblenz–Trier line (KBS 690);
- Saarbrücken via the Saarbrücken–Trier line (KBS 685);
- Perl via the Thionville–Trier line (KBS 692); and
- Luxembourg via the Mosel-Syre Valley route (KBS 693).

Both of these last two railways merge with the Saar Railway in Konz.

=== Long distance traffic ===
From Trier, IC trains formerly operated every two hours via Koblenz, Andernach, Bonn, Köln, Düsseldorf, Oberhausen, Münster (Westf) and Rheine to Emden/Norddeich Mole, and every two hours from Emden/Norddeich-Mole on the same itinerary in reverse, then onwards to Luxembourg. After the timetable change for 2005, Trier had an ICE connection with Berlin, by an ICE train that started its journey at the Trier Hauptbahnhof. That ICE train operated via Koblenz, Andernach, Bonn (the Linke Rheinstrecke), Köln, Wuppertal, Hamm and Hannover.

In November 2011, ICE services were discontinued and long-distance services were reduced to only two IC trains per day on the line. These services ended on 13 December 2014 with the introduction of the Rhineland-Palatinate integrated regular interval service (Rheinland-Pfalz-Taktes 2015) on the line.

Currently the IC 37 operated once a day, although 3 train pairs are planned from December 2025.

Line	Route	Frequency
IC 37	Düsseldorf – Cologne – Bonn – Remagen – Andernach – Koblenz – Cochem – Bullay – Wittlich – Trier – Wasserbillig – Luxembourg	1 train pair

=== Regional traffic ===
As of the December 2022 timetable change, the following services stop at Trier Hbf:

Line	Description	Train route	Frequency
RE 1	Südwest-Express	Koblenz – Wittlich – Trier – Saarlouis – Völklingen – Saarbrücken	Every hour (Koblenz–Kaiserslautern) every two hours (Kaiserslautern–Mannheim)
RE 11	Saartal-Express	Trier – Merzig (Saar) – Saarlouis – Völklingen – Saarbrücken	Every hour
RE 12	Eifel-Mosel-Express	Köln Messe/Deutz – Köln Hbf – Erftstadt – Euskirchen – Gerolstein – Bitburg-Erdorf – Trier	Individual services
RE 16	Trier-Lorraine-Express	Trier – Konz – Perl (Mosel) – Thionville – Metz	Two train pairs each way on Saturdays, Sundays and public holidays
RB 22	Eifel-Express	Köln Messe/Deutz – Cologne – Erftstadt – Euskirchen – Gerolstein – Bitburg-Erdorf – Trier (until Gerolstein RE 22)	Hourly
RB 71	Saartal-Bahn	Trier – Konz – Merzig (Saar) – Saarlouis – Völklingen – Saarbrücken – St. Ingbert – Homburg (Saar)	Hourly
RB 81	Moseltal-Bahn	Koblenz – Cochem (Mosel) – Wittlich – Trier	Hourly
RB 82	Elbling-Express	Wittlich – Trier – Konz Mitte – Wellen (Mosel) – Perl	Hourly (Wittlich–Trier only Mon–Fri)
RB 83		Wittlich – Trier – Luxembourg	Hourly

=== Bus traffic ===
In the evenings and on weekends, Trier Hbf is the focal point of Trier's bus traffic. Each district of Trier can be reached from there without any need to change buses.

== Gallery ==
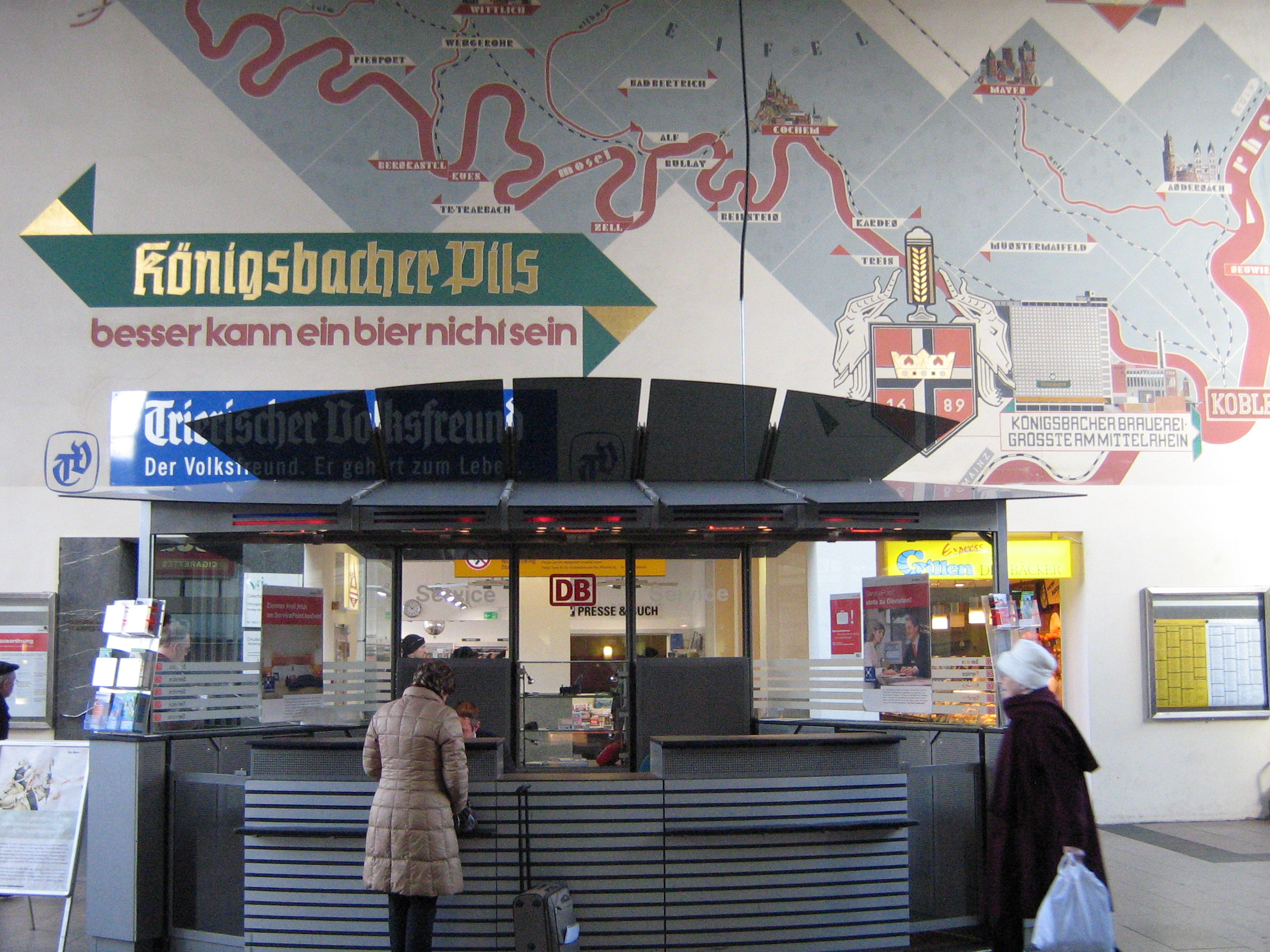
Station lobby (foreground: Info Point).

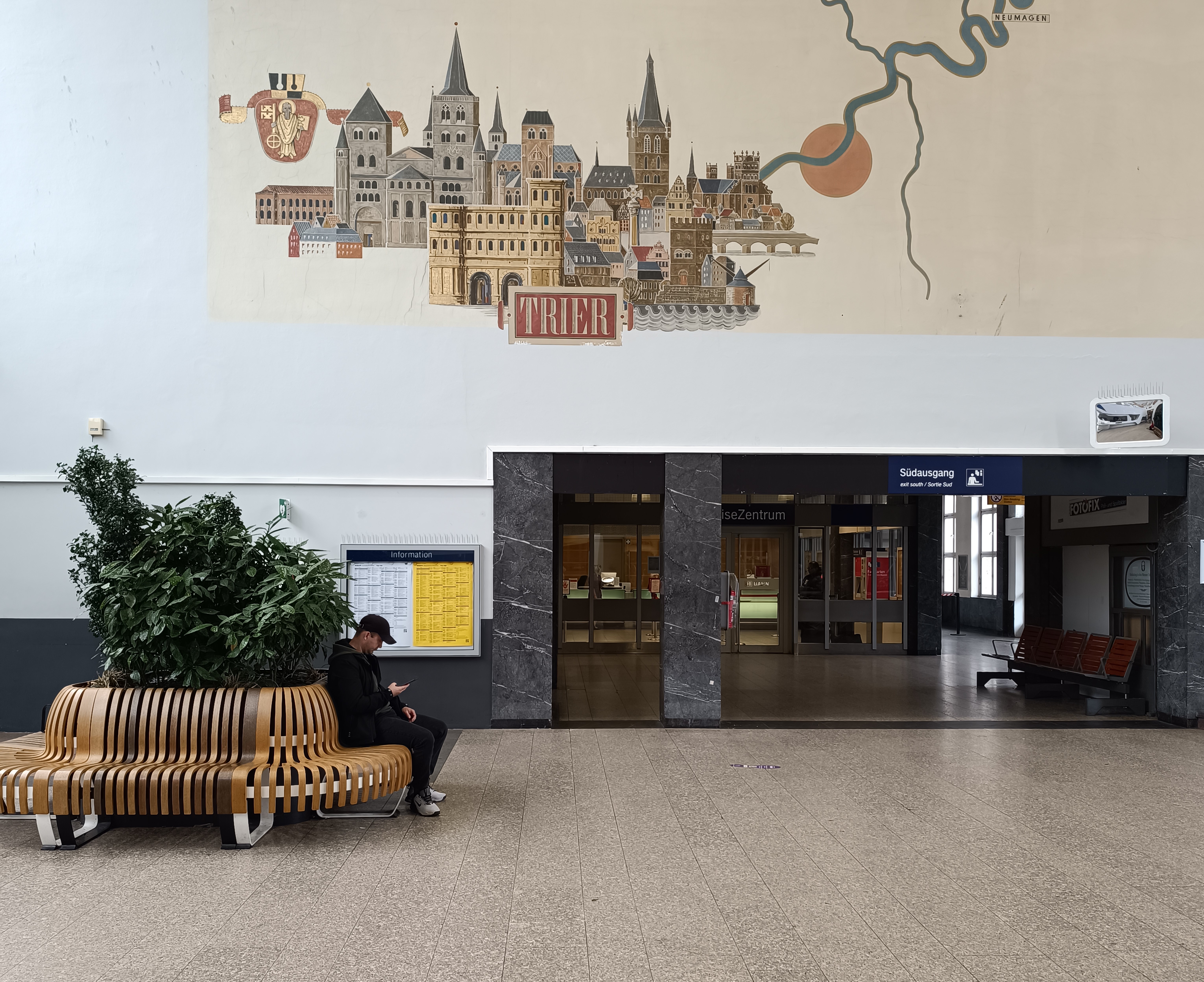
Painting in the hall.

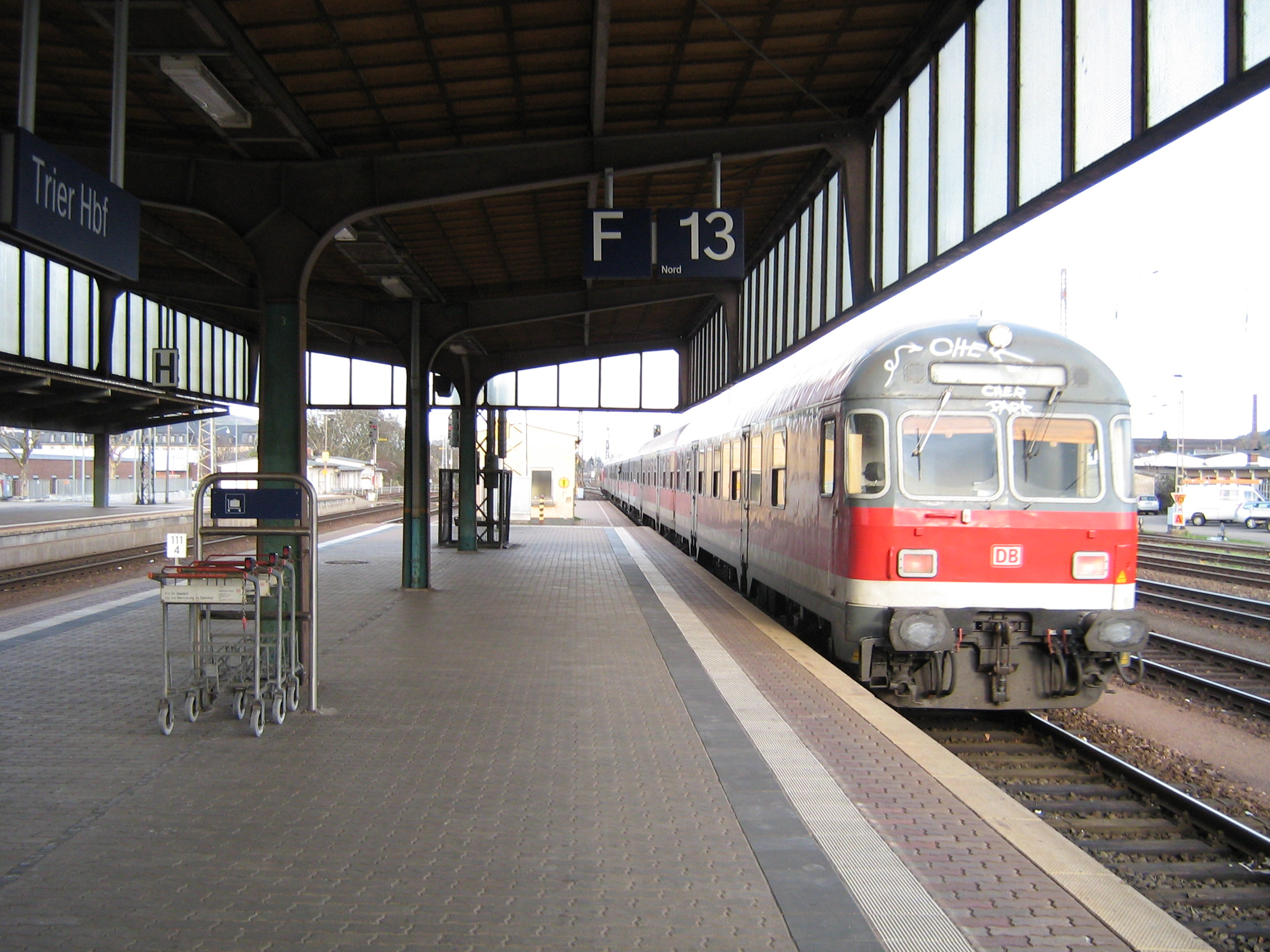
Train on platform 12/13.

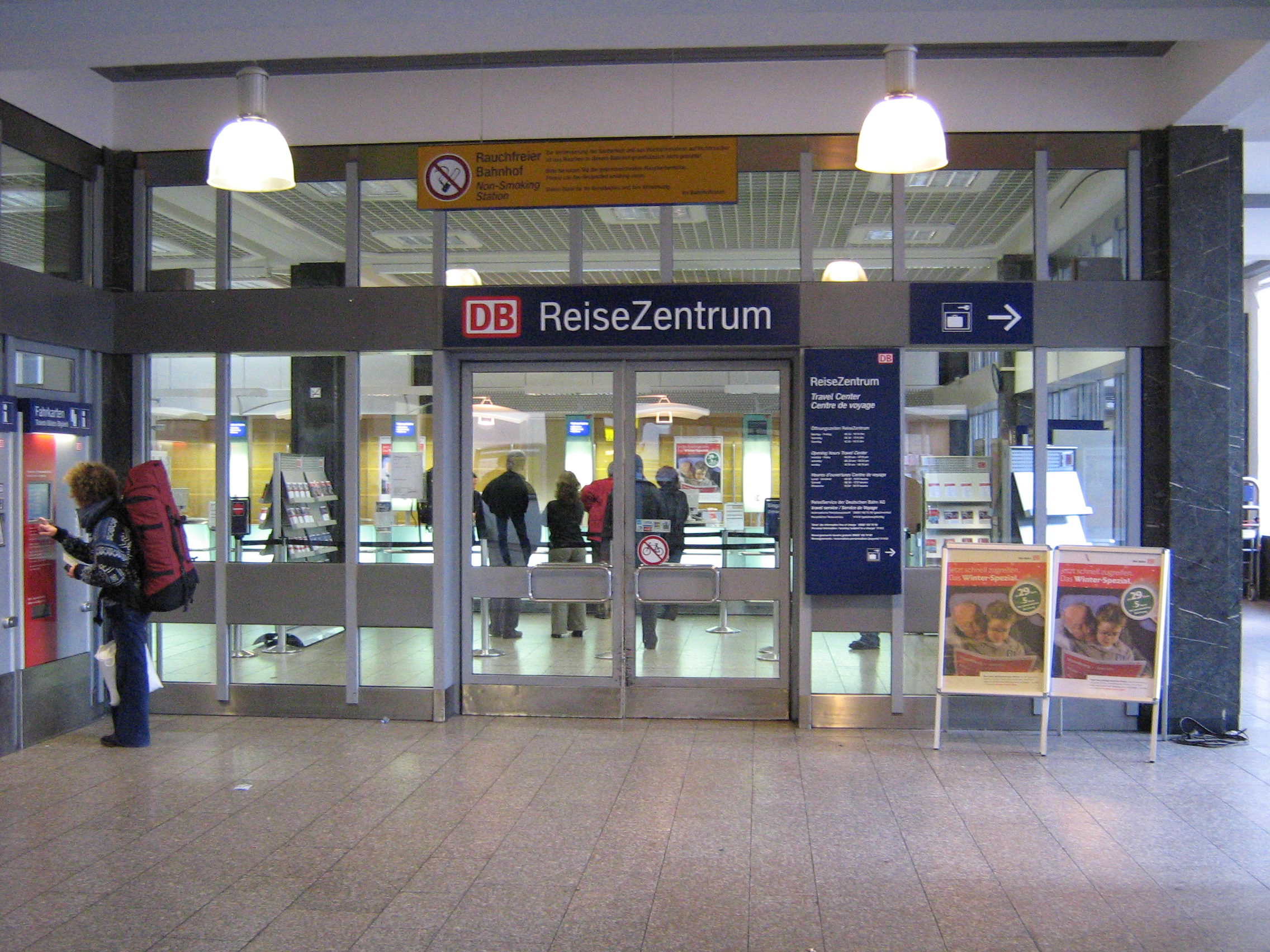
The DB travel centre.

== See also ==
- Rail transport in Germany
- Railway stations in Germany
