= Bous, Germany =

Bous
- Municipality
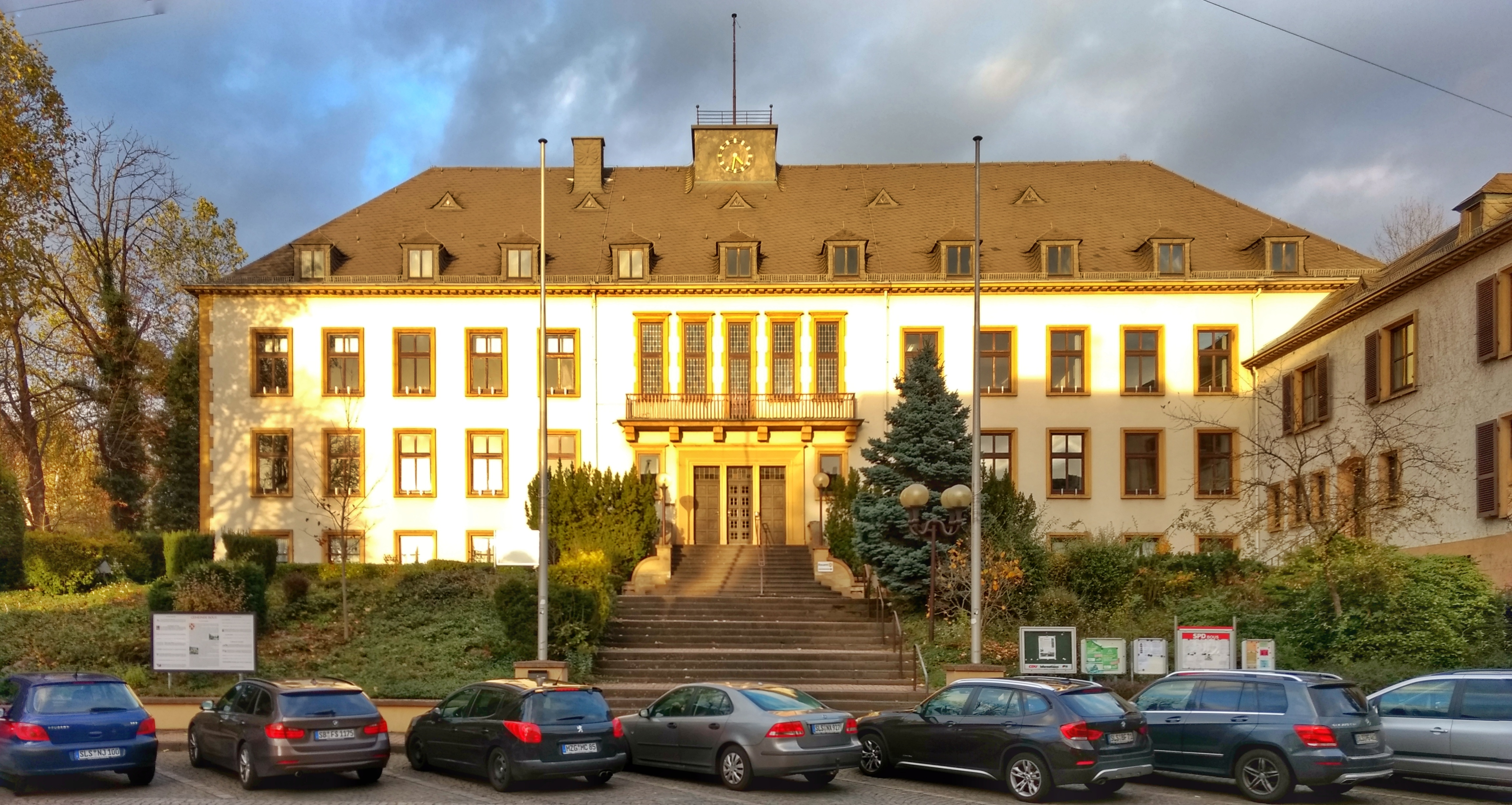
- Bous town hall

- Coat of arms

- Location of Bous within Saarlouis district
- Interactive map of Bous
- Location within Germany Location within Saarland
- Coordinates: 49°16′N 6°47′E
- Country: Germany
- State: Saarland
- District: Saarlouis

Government
  - Mayor (2019–29): Stefan Louis

Area
  - Total: 7.63 km^{2} (2.95 sq mi)
- Elevation: 229 m (751 ft)

Population (2025-12-31)
  - Total: 7,334
  - Density: 961/km^{2} (2,490/sq mi)
- Time zone: UTC+01:00 (CET)
  - Summer (DST): UTC+02:00 (CEST)
- Postal codes: 66353–66359
- Dialling codes: 06834
- Vehicle registration: SLS
- Website: www.bous.de

Bous (German pronunciation: [buːs]) is a municipality in the district of Saarlouis, in Saarland, Germany. It is situated on the river Saar, approx. 5 km (3.1 mi) southeast of Saarlouis, and 15 km (9.3 mi) west of Saarbrücken.

== Sister cities ==
- Koulikoro, Mali
- Quetigny, France
