= Homburg (Saar) Hauptbahnhof =

Railway station in Homburg, Germany

Homburg (Saar) Hbf
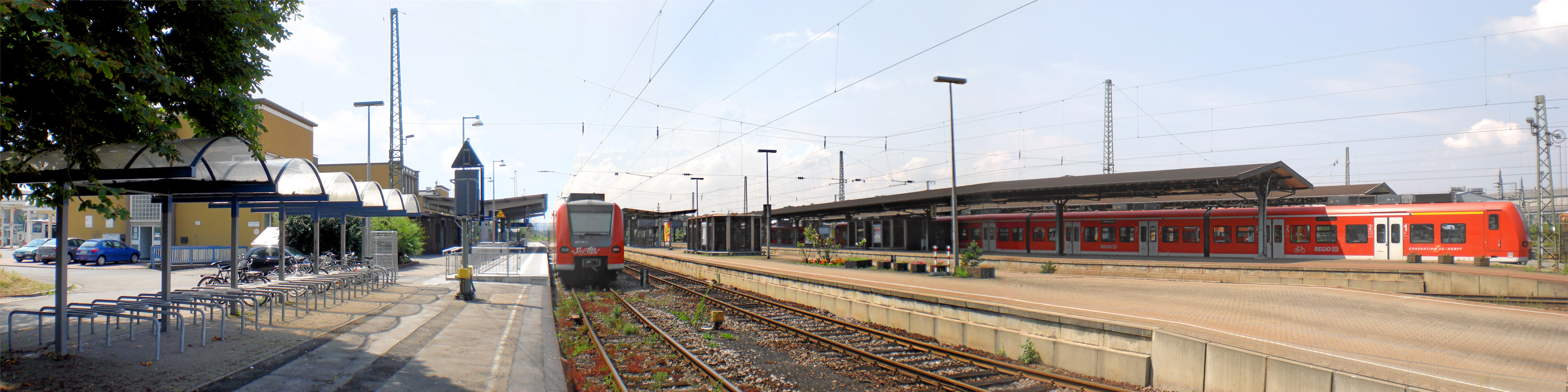
- Panorama of station building and track

General information
- Location: Bahnhofsplatz 5, Homburg (Saar), Saarland; Germany
- Coordinates: 49°19′40″N 7°20′13″E
- Owner: DB Netz
- Operator: DB Station&Service
- Lines: Palatine Ludwig Railway (KBS 670); Homburg–Neunkirchen (KBS 683); Glan Valley Railway, closed; Blies Valley Railway, closed
- Platforms: 7

Construction
- Accessible: Yes

Other information
- Station code: 2892
- DS100 code: SHO
- IBNR: 8000176
- Category: 3
- Fare zone: SaarVV: 541; VRN: 541 (SaarVV transitional tariff)
- Website: www.bahnhof.de

Passengers
- 6,500 per day

Services
Preceding station	DB Fernverkehr	Following station
Saarbrücken Hbf Terminus	ICE 3 Sprinter	Kaiserslautern Hbf towards Berlin Südkreuz
Saarbrücken Hbf Terminus	ICE 15	Kaiserslautern Hbf towards Ostseebad Binz
Saarbrücken Hbf Terminus	ICE 60	Landstuhl towards München Hbf
Location
- Location within Saarland

Homburg (Saar) Hauptbahnhof is a railway station in the town of Homburg in the German state of Saarland. It is a through station with four platforms and seven platform tracks and is classified by Deutsche Bahn as a station of category 3. It is located at the junction of the Homburg–Neunkirchen line and the Mannheim–Saarbrücken line (Palatine Ludwig Railway). It has been the western terminus of line S1 of the Rhine-Neckar S-Bahn since 2006.

== Location ==
The station divides the town into two halves, separating Homburg-Mitte and Homburg-Erbach. It is about 700 metres away from the town centre. In front of the station area is the central bus station (ZOB), from which both regional and local buses operate.

== History ==
On 1 July 1848, the line between Kaiserslautern and Homburg was opened. Nine years later, on 7 May 1857, the Blies Valley Railway was opened to Zweibrücken. The Homburg–Rohrbach line, now part of the mainline between Mannheim and Saarbrücken, opened to traffic on 1 January 1904. The electrification of the railway station to Homburg was inaugurated on 8 March 1960. 31 years later, on 6 March 1991, the first EuroCity service, the EC 56: Goethe, stopped in Homburg. A few days later, on 22 March 1991, the first InterCity (IC), the IC 26 stopped here. In the summer and autumn of 1991 the tracks were adapted for the operation of Intercity-Express trains, so that in January 1992, the first ICE (Type 1) ran to Homburg. In the following years, the station and the environment was modernised, including by the installation of electronic noticeboards for outgoing train and bus connections, lifts on all tracks and electronic noticeboards on platforms. Covered bicycle parking was also provided. Various platforms have been upgraded, including platform 1 as the normal platform for Rhine-Neckar S-Bahn services. In 2008, the modernisation of platforms 7 and 8 was completed.

== Services ==
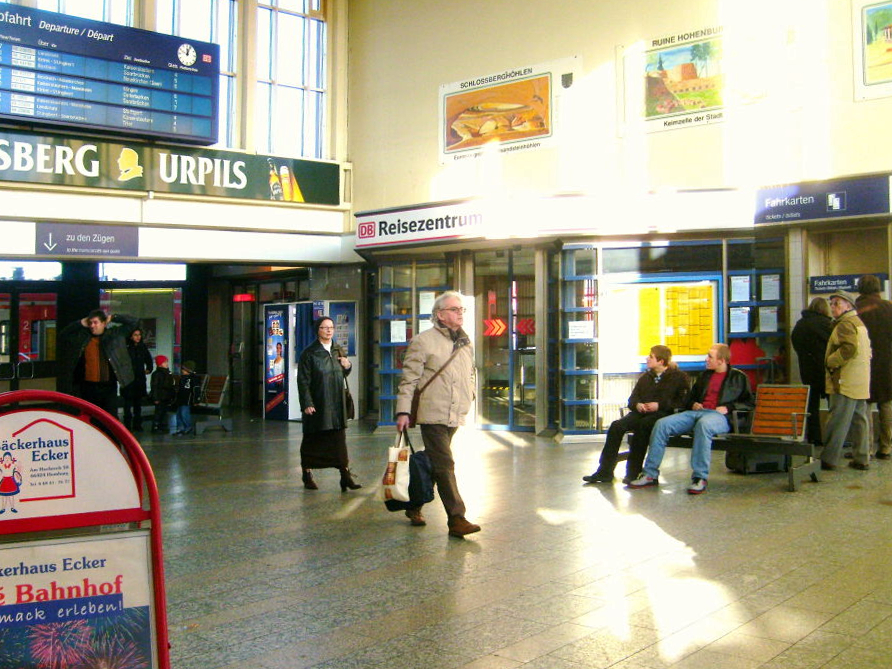
Homburg station hall

=== Long distance ===
In the 2026 timetable, the following long-distance services stop at the station.

Line	Route	Frequency
ICE 3	Saarbrücken – Homburg – Kaiserslautern – Mannheim – Frankfurt – Berlin – Berlin Südkreuz	One train pair
ICE 15	Saarbrücken – Homburg – Kaiserslautern – Mannheim – Darmstadt – Frankfurt – Erfurt – Halle – Berlin – Eberswalde – Stralsund – Binz	One train pair
ICE 60	Saarbrücken – Homburg – Kaiserslautern – Mannheim – Stuttgart – Ulm – Augsburg – Munich	2 train pairs

=== Rapid transit and regional transportation ===
In the 2026 timetable, the following regional services stop at the station.

Line	Route	Frequency
RE 1	Koblenz – Trier – Dillingen (Saar) – Saarbrücken – Homburg (Saar) – Kaiserslautern – Neustadt (Weinstr) – Ludwigshafen (Rhein) Mitte – Ludwigshafen (Rhein) – Mannheim	Hourly
RB 70	Kaiserslautern – Landstuhl – Bruchmühlbach-Miesau – Homburg (Saar) – St. Ingbert – Saarbrücken – Dillingen (Saar) – Merzig (Saar)	Hourly
RB 71	Homburg (Saar) – St. Ingbert – Saarbrücken – Saarlouis – Merzig – Saarburg – Trier	Hourly
RB 74	Illingen (Saar) – Neunkirchen – Homburg (Saar)	Half-hourly
RB 76	Saarbrücken – Merchweiler – Neunkirchen (Saar) – Homburg (Saar)	4 train pairs
S1	Homburg (Saar) – Kaiserslautern – Neustadt (Weinstraße) – Ludwigshafen (Rhein) – Mannheim – Heidelberg – Eberbach – Mosbach (Baden) – (Osterburken)	Hourly
S2	Karlsruhe – Heidelberg – Mannheim – Ludwigshafen – Neustadt (Weinstr) – Kaiserslautern - Homburg (Saar)	An evening train on the weekend
S3	Homburg (Saar) - Kaiserslautern – Neustadt (Weinstr) – Ludwigshafen (Rhein) - Mannheim – Heidelberg – Karlsruhe	A morning train on working days.

=== Freight ===
Besides passenger services, eight tracks are allocated for freight operations. Two of the town’s three industrial areas are connected by sidings. There is also a siding on the line to Bexbach connecting to the site of the former army depot in Homburg.

=== Facilities ===
The Deutsche Bahn travel centre is open daily. The station buildings have ticket machines, public telephones, lockers, toilets (including for the disabled), a bistro-cafe, a station bookshop, a restaurant and a photo booth.
