= List of railway stations in the Saarland =

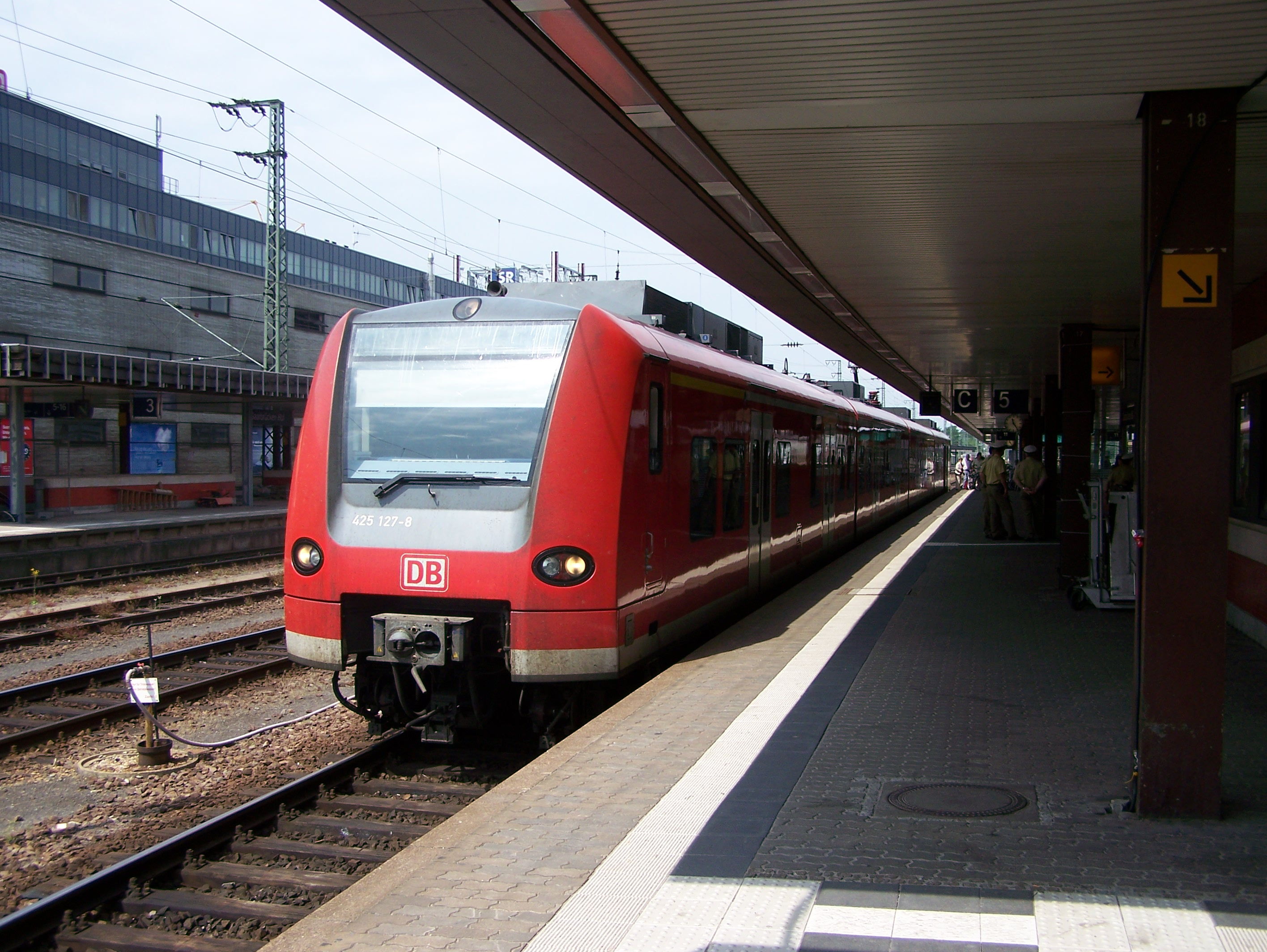
Electric multiple unit at Saarbrücken Hauptbahnhof

This list covers the passenger railway stations and halts in the Saarland, a state in southwestern Germany, that are served by scheduled and/or museum services.

== Description ==
The list is organised as follows:

- Name: current name of the station or halt.
- Urban/Rural county (‘’Kreis)’’: This column gives the county in which the station is located. The abbreviations used are given below and correspond to the standard abbreviations used on German car number plates. The counties in the Saarland are:
  - Merzig-Wadern (MZG)
  - Neunkirchen (NK)
  - Regionalverband Saarbrücken (SB und VK)
  - Saarlouis (SLS)
  - Saarpfalz (HOM und IGB)
  - St. Wendel (WND)
- Railway operator: All the stations in the Saarland are part of the Saarländischer Verkehrsverbund (saarVV).
- Cat: The Cat column shows the current category of the station as at 1 January 2013. This only applies however to DB Station&Service stations and excludes stations run by private operators like the Losheim Museum Railway Club (MECL).
- The next five columns show which types of train use the station. The individual abbreviations are based on those used by the DB AG but are applied equally to the equivalent services of other operators:
  - ICE – InterCityExpress and TGV
  - IC – Intercity and Eurocity
  - RE – Regional-Express
  - RB – Regionalbahn
  - S – S-Bahn and Saarbahn
- Line – This column gives the railway line on which the station is situated. Only routes that are still operating over the section in which the station is found are named.
- Remarks – In this column additional information is provided, particularly with regard to railway operators and seasonal services.

== Station overview ==
Station	City/ District (Kreis)	Railway operator	Cat	ICE	IC	RE	RB	S	Line	Remarks
Auersmacher	SB	saarVV	5					x	Saarbrücken–Sarreguemines	
Bachem	MZG								Merzig–Büschfeld	Owner: MECL; Museum railway
Baltersweiler	WND	saarVV	6				x		Bingen–Saarbrücken	
Beckingen (Saar)	MZG	saarVV	6			x	x		Saarbrücken–Trier	
Besch	MZG	saarVV	6				x		Trier–Metz	
Besseringen	MZG	saarVV	6				x		Saarbrücken–Trier	
Bexbach	HOM	saarVV	6				x		Homburg–Neunkirchen	
Bierbach	HOM	saarVV	7				x		Pirmasens–Rohrbach	
Bildstock	SB	saarVV	6				x		Bingen–Saarbrücken	
Blieskastel-Lautzkirchen	HOM	saarVV	6				x		Pirmasens–Rohrbach	
Brebach	SB	saarVV	5					x	Saarbrücken–Sarreguemines	
Bous (Saar)	SLS	saarVV	6			x	x		Saarbrücken–Trier	
Bubach	SLS	saarVV	6				x		Nonnweiler–Neunkirchen	
Bübingen	SB	saarVV	5					x	Saarbrücken–Sarreguemines	
Dellborner Mühle	MZG								Merzig–Büschfeld	Owner: MECL; Museum railway
Dillingen (Saar)	SLS	saarVV	3			x	x		Dillingen–Bouzonville; Saarbrücken–Trier	
Dirmingen	NK	saarVV	6				x		Nonnweiler–Neunkirchen	
Dudweiler	SB	saarVV	6				x		Bingen–Saarbrücken	
Eckelhausen-Bostalsee	WND								Trier–Türkismühle	Owner: HWB; Museum railway
Ensdorf (Saar)	SLS	saarVV	6				x		Saarbrücken–Trier	
Eppelborn	NK	saarVV	5				x		Nonnweiler–Neunkirchen	
Fischbach-Camphausen	SB	saarVV	6				x		Saarbrücken–Wemmetsweiler	
Fremersdorf	MZG	saarVV	6				x		Saarbrücken–Trier	village located in SLS county
Friedrichsthal (Saar)	SB	saarVV	6				x		Bingen–Saarbrücken	
Friedrichsthal Mitte	SB	saarVV	6				x		Bingen–Saarbrücken	
Güdingen	SB	saarVV	5					x	Saarbrücken–Sarreguemines	
Hanweiler-Bad Rilchingen	SB	saarVV	6					x	Saarbrücken–Sarreguemines	
Hassel (Saar)	IGB	saarVV	6				x		Pirmasens–Rohrbach	
Hemmersdorf (Saar)	SLS	saarVV	7				x		Dillingen–Bouzonville	
Hofeld	WND	saarVV	6				x		Bingen–Saarbrücken	
Homburg (Saar) Hauptbahnhof	HOM	saarVV; VRN	3	x	x	x	x	x	Homburg–Neunkirchen; Mannheim–Saarbrücken	
Illingen (Saar)	NK	saarVV	6				x		Nonnweiler–Neunkirchen	
Jägersfreude	SB	saarVV	6				x		Bingen–Saarbrücken	
Kirkel	HOM	saarVV	6			x	x		Mannheim–Saarbrücken	
Kleinblittersdorf	SB	saarVV	6					x	Saarbrücken–Sarreguemines	
Landsweiler-Reden	NK	saarVV	5				x		Bingen–Saarbrücken	
Lebach	SLS	saarVV	6				x		Nonnweiler–Neunkirchen	
Lebach-Jabach	SLS	saarVV	6				x		Nonnweiler–Neunkirchen	
Limbach (b Homburg, Saar)	HOM	saarVV	6				x		Mannheim–Saarbrücken	
Losheim (Saar)	MZG								Merzig–Büschfeld	Owner: MECL; Museum railway
Luisenthal (Saar)	VK	saarVV	6				x		Saarbrücken–Trier	
Merchweiler	NK	saarVV	6				x		Saarbrücken–Wemmetsweiler	
Merzig (Saar)	MZG	saarVV	4			x	x		Saarbrücken–Trier	
Merzig-Brotdorf	MZG								Merzig–Büschfeld	Owner: MECL; Museum railway
Merzig Ost	MZG								Merzig–Büschfeld	Owner: MECL; Museum railway
Merzig Stadtmitte	MZG	saarVV	6				x		Saarbrücken–Trier	
Mettlach	MZG	saarVV	6			x	x		Saarbrücken–Trier	
Namborn	WND	saarVV	6				x		Bingen–Saarbrücken	
Nennig	MZG	saarVV	6				x		Trier–Metz	
Neunkirchen (Saar) Hauptbahnhof	NK	saarVV	4			x	x		Bingen–Saarbrücken; Homburg–Neunkirchen; Nonnweiler–Neunkirchen	
Neunkirchen-Wellesweiler	NK	saarVV	5				x		Homburg–Neunkirchen	
Niedaltdorf	SLS	saarVV	7				x		Dillingen–Bouzonville	
Niederlinxweiler	WND	saarVV	5				x		Bingen–Saarbrücken	
Niederlosheim	MZG								Merzig–Büschfeld	Owner: MECL; Museum railway
Nohfelden	WND	saarVV	7				x		Bingen–Saarbrücken	
Nonnweiler	WND								Trier–Türkismühle	Owner: HWB; Museum railway
Oberlinxweiler	WND	saarVV	6				x		Bingen–Saarbrücken	
Ottweiler (Saar)	NK	saarVV	5				x		Bingen–Saarbrücken	
Perl	MZG	saarVV	6			x	x		Trier–Metz	
Quierschied	SB	saarVV	6				x		Saarbrücken–Wemmetsweiler	
Rentrisch	IGB	saarVV	6				x		Mannheim–Saarbrücken	
Rohrbach (Saar)	IGB	saarVV	5			x	x		Mannheim–Saarbrücken; Pirmasens–Rohrbach	
Saarbrücken-Burbach	SB	saarVV	5				x		Saarbrücken–Trier	
Saarbrücken Hauptbahnhof	SB	saarVV	2	x	x	x	x	x	Bingen–Saarbrücken; Mannheim–Saarbrücken; Saarbrücken–Metz; Saarbrücken–Wemmetsweiler; Saarbrücken–Sarreguemines; Saarbrücken–Trier	Saarbahn halt in front of the station
Saarbrücken Messebahnhof	SB	saarVV							Saarbrücken–Bous	only during shows
Saarbrücken Ost	SB	saarVV	5			x	x		Mannheim–Saarbrücken	
Saarhölzbach	MZG	saarVV	5			x	x		Saarbrücken–Trier	
Saarlouis Hauptbahnhof	SLS	saarVV	3			x	x		Saarbrücken–Trier	
Schafbrücke	SB	saarVV	6				x		Mannheim–Saarbrücken	
Scheidt (Saar)	SB	saarVV	5			x	x		Mannheim–Saarbrücken	
Schiffweiler	NK	saarVV	6				x		Nonnweiler–Neunkirchen	
Schwarzenbach	WND								Trier–Türkismühle	Owner: HWB; Museum railway
Siersburg	SLS	saarVV	6				x		Dillingen–Bouzonville	
St. Ingbert	IGB	saarVV	3			x	x		Mannheim–Saarbrücken	
St. Wendel	WND	saarVV	4			x	x		Bingen–Saarbrücken	
Sulzbach (Saar)	SB	saarVV	5			x	x		Bingen–Saarbrücken	
Sulzbach (Saar)-Altenwald	SB	saarVV	6				x		Bingen–Saarbrücken	
Türkismühle	WND	saarVV	5				x		Bingen–Saarbrücken	
Völklingen	VK	saarVV	4			x	x		Saarbrücken–Trier	
Walhausen (Saar)	WND	saarVV	6				x		Bingen–Saarbrücken	
Wemmetsweiler Rathaus	NK	saarVV	7				x		Nonnweiler–Neunkirchen	
Wiebelskirchen	NK	saarVV	6				x		Bingen–Saarbrücken	
Würzbach (Saar)	IGB	saarVV	6				x		Pirmasens–Rohrbach	
Wustweiler	NK	saarVV	7				x		Nonnweiler–Neunkirchen	

== See also ==
- German railway station categories
- Railway station types of Germany
- List of scheduled railway routes in Germany
