= Saarbahn =

German light rail system

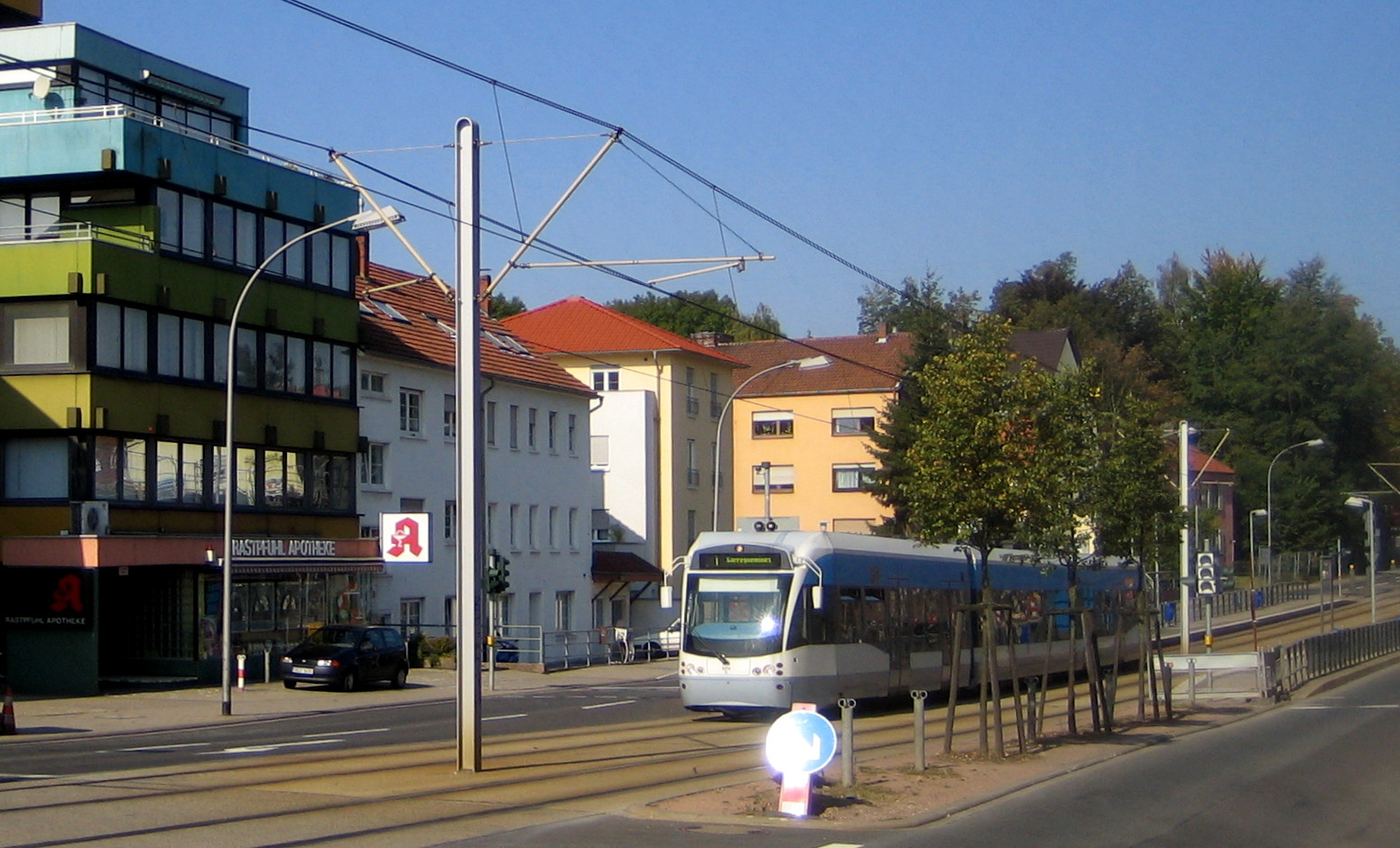

Overview
- Locale: Saarland, Germany
- Transit type: Stadtbahn/Tram-train
- Number of lines: 1
- Number of stations: 43
- Website: Saarbahn GmbH

Operation
- Began operation: 24 October 1997
- Operator: Stadtbahn Saar GmbH

Technical
- System length: 44.0 km (27.3 mi)
- Track gauge: 1,435 mm (4 ft 8 1/2 in) standard gauge
- Minimum radius of curvature: 19 m (62 ft)
- Electrification: 750 V DC + 15 kV 16 2/3 Hz AC overhead line
System map
- Source: German railway atlas

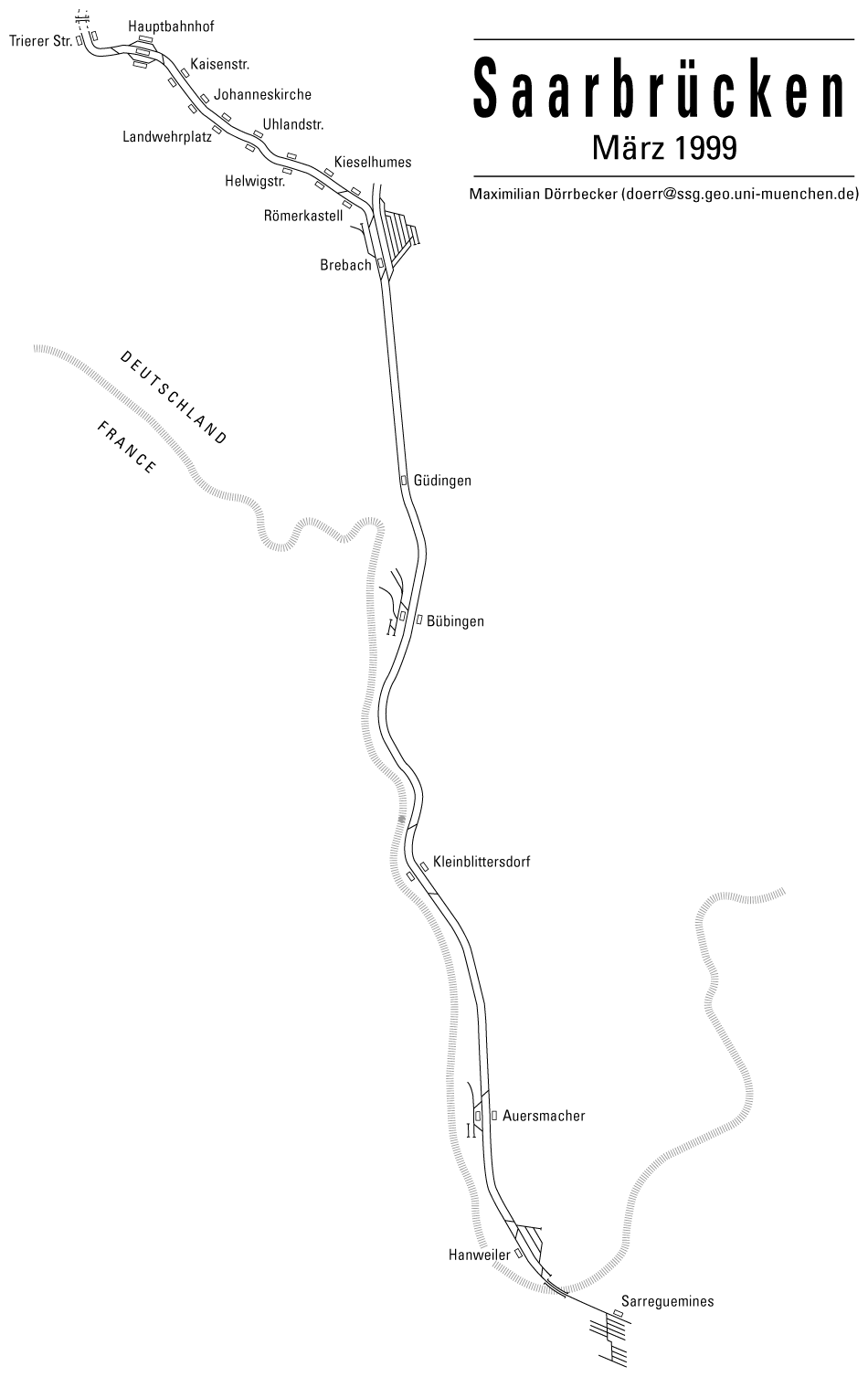
Track plan of the Saarbahn as at March 1999

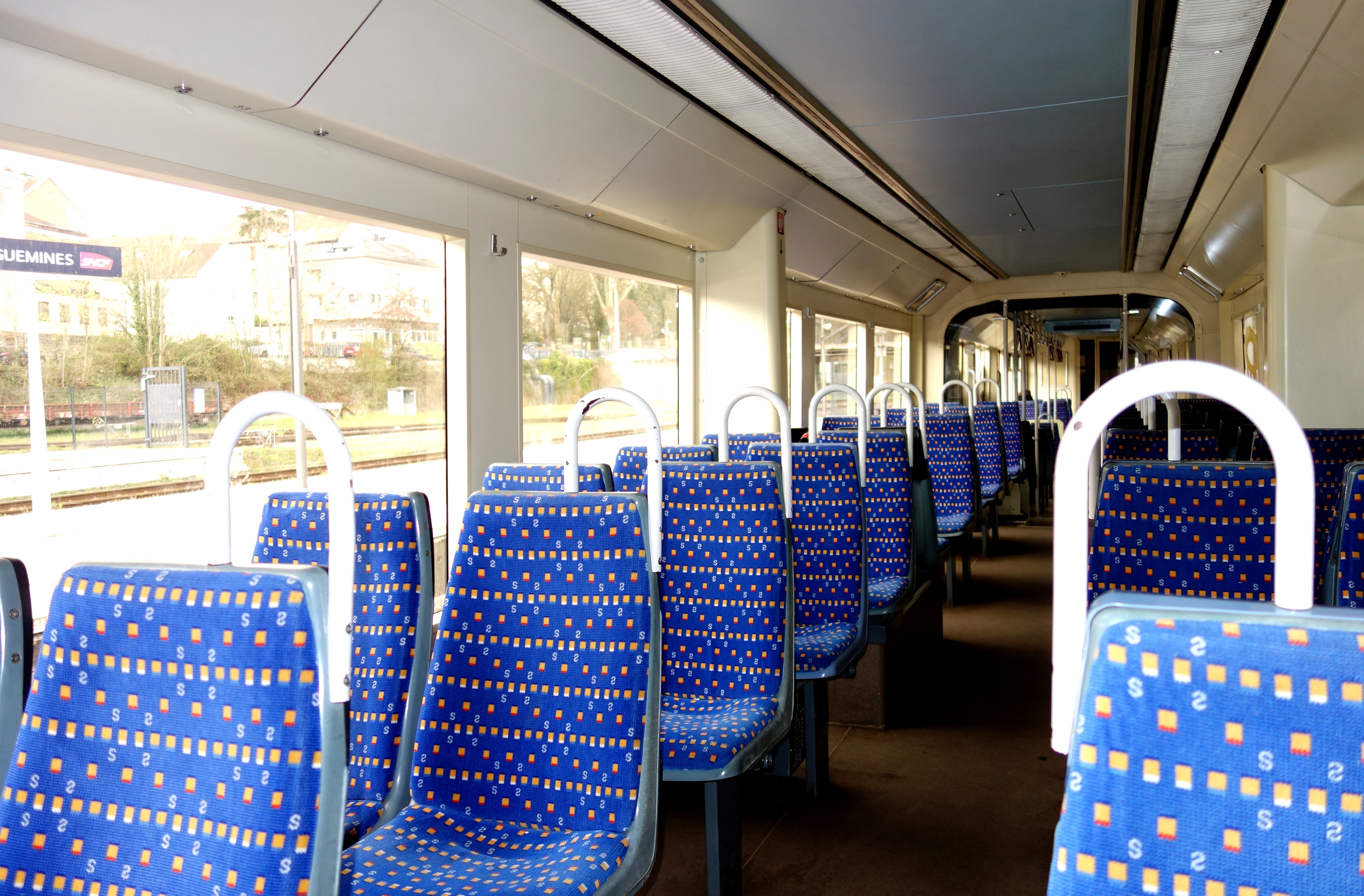
Interior of a Saarbahn Vehicle

The Saarbahn is a regional Stadtbahn operating on the tram-train principle in the German state of the Saarland. It consists of a core line in Saarbrücken and Riegelsberg operating under tram operating procedures (BOStrab), connected to two lines that are operated under railway operating procedures (EBO), the Lebach–Völklingen railway to the north and the Saarbrücken–Sarreguemines railway in the south. Stadtbahn Saar GmbH is responsible for the infrastructure of the central section of line, while the outer tracks are operated by the national railway infrastructure companies, DB InfraGO AG in Germany and SNCF Réseau in France. The system is operated by Saarbahn GmbH, and integrated in the Saarländischer Verkehrsverbund (SaarVV).

The route of the new line of the Saarbahn that was opened in central Saarbrücken in 1997 is essentially line 5 of the Saarbrücken tramway, which was closed in 1965. This line ran between Rastpfuhl and Schafbrücke and was the last line of the old metre-gauge network.

As of 2015, the current network operates on 44.0 kilometres (27.3 mi) of route, and serves 43 stations.

== History ==
=== Early planning ===
The first considerations of building a regional rail network in and around Saarbrücken began in the 1990s. The bus service in central Saarbrücken then ran at such a high density that the vehicles sometimes operated at one-minute intervals. Following the example of the Karlsruhe model, which had operated with great success since 1992, the Saarland began to plan to build a regional Stadtbahn. The core of the concept was the building of an inner-city railway line, while the outer branches would share the existing Deutsche Bahn railway infrastructure. As early as 1992, it borrowed a light rail vehicle from the Karlsruhe Stadtbahn and ran it on the Fürstenhausen–Gersweiler Bahnhof–Saarbrücken Messebahnhof route on the Rossel Valley Railway (Rosseltalbahn), south of the Saar.

=== Advance operations on the Saarbrücken–Sarreguemines line ===
Before the opening of the Saarbrücken city centre line, there was a trial operation between Saarbrücken Central Station (Hauptbahnhof) and Hanweiler with Saarbahn vehicles. However, as it was still in the Deutsche Bahn timetable, replacing the previously locomotive-hauled trains on this section, it was operated by Deutsche Bahn. This forward operation began on 29 September 1997 and ended on 24 October 1997, the opening day of the new line through the city centre.

=== Tenth anniversary ===
On 24 October 2007, the Saarbrücken Stadtbahn celebrated its tenth train anniversary. Since inception more than 100 million passengers had been carried, almost twice as many as originally planned. Thus, it had become a great success as a model for other cities considering the establishment of a light railway.

== Operations ==
=== Commissioning of the central section ===
The core of the Saarbahn—the new line between Brebach station and Ludwigstraße—was put into operation on 24 October 1997, after just under two and a half years of construction. Since its opening, there has been a system separation point between Römerkastell and Brebach station. This is a 90-metre (300 ft)-long non-energised section of the overhead line, which is traversed using momentum, while the vehicle's electric system automatically switches to the other system. Saarbahn railcars coming from central Saarbrücken change from 750 V DC to 15 kV 16 2/3 Hz AC and run via Kleinblittersdorf to Sarreguemines, Lorraine. The French section from the border station at Hanweiler has been equipped with the German electric system since 1983. The first light rail vehicle that reached Saarguemines was two-system railcar 810 of the Albtal-Verkehrs-Gesellschaft (AVG), which ran there on 11 September 1993 during a presentation ride.

=== Northern extension ===
The extension in the northerly direction took place in several stages. It was extended to Cottbuser Platz on 31 July 1999, to Siedlerheim on 13 November 2000, to Riegelsberg Süd on 24 September 2001 and to Walpershofen/Etzenhofen on 26 September 2009. Construction of the Riegelsberg Süd–Walpershofen/Etzenhofen section, required the contribution of additional costs of around €630,000 per year (an amount that was until recently disputed) from the city of Saarbrücken, the municipality of Riegelsberg and indirectly from the Saarland. Clearing work was performed on the former route of the Koller Valley Railway (Lebach–Völklingen railway) through Walpershofen and Dilsburg in January and February 2009, the railway overpass in the center of Walpershofen was renewed in 2009/10 and the reactivation of Heusweiler Markt was largely completed in the summer of 2011. This stretch of track was inaugurated on 30 October 2011.

Although another system separation point between BOStrab and EBO was instituted at Walpershofen in 2011, the electrical system does not change there because the electric system for the Saarbahn on the Koller Valley Railway also runs at 750 V DC.

With the exception of a small section between Riegelsberg-Güchenbach and Walpershofen/Etzenhofen over which the Saarbahn runs in an east-west direction along the Russenweg (L 267), which had never been used by a railway, the Saarbahn follows two very different historical railway lines:

From Saarbrücken through the Köllertaler Wald (Köller valley forest) and Riegelsberg to Riegelsberg-Güchenbach, Saarbahn follows the course of the historical Riegelsberg tramway: an interurban tram line from St.Johann/Saarbrücken via Riegelsberg to Heusweiler, which was opened in 1907. The line broadly followed the following day's federal highway 268, which also continues directly from Güchenbach to Heusweiler. The line served the mines in Heusweiler-Dilsburg and Von der Heydt. The tramway was replaced by trolleybuses in 1953 and was replaced in turn by diesel-powered buses in 1964.

After the new section between Riegelsberg-Güchenbach and Walpershofen/Etzenhofen, the Saarbahn reaches, at the Walpershofen/Etzenhofen stop, the line of the former Koller Valley Railway, over which it continues north through Walpershofen to its temporary terminus at Heusweiler Markt.

=== Extension to Lebach ===
A 10.4-kilometre (6.5 mi) extension of the current line, from the current northern terminus, Heusweiler Markt, north to Lebach-Jabach opened for service on 5 October 2014. This extension will expand the Saarbahn line to cover a total of 44.0 kilometres (27.3 mi) of route.

=== Operational concept ===
Currently the 44.0-kilometre (27.3 mi) cross-city route is operated as line S1 between Heusweiler Markt and Sarreguemines, with services every 7.5 minutes during the day on the core section between Siedlerheim and Brebach station. Originally, a five-minute interval service was planned for the central area, but this was rejected because it would have led to operational problems. On the sections using rail tracks between Brebach and Kleinblittersdorf and between Heusweiler Markt and Siedlerheim there is a 15-minute interval service and on the Kleinblittersdorf–Sarreguemines section services operate every 30 minutes only in the morning and every 60 minutes at other times.

In the off peak hour, services operate at 15-minute intervals in the central section, every 30 minutes to Kleinblittersdorf or Siedlerheim and every 60 minutes to Sarreguemines. In the morning peak for professional and school transport and in the afternoon peak, coupled vehicles are used, otherwise single sets are operated. The Saarbahn carries approximately 40,000 passengers daily.

== Rolling stock ==
Currently there are 28 Flexity Link tram-trains in use, which were manufactured by Bombardier in Vienna and Bruges. Six sets were temporarily loaned to Kassel, where they operated trial runs for RegioTram Kassel. From the timetable change in December 2009, three tram-trains were lent to the Stadtbahn Karlsruhe for use on line S9.

In January 2022, Saarländischer Verkehrsverbund (SaarVV) announced that they had ordered Stadler Citylinks for their network as part of the VDV tram-train consortium. The first Citylink tram-train was delivered to Saarbahn in 2025.

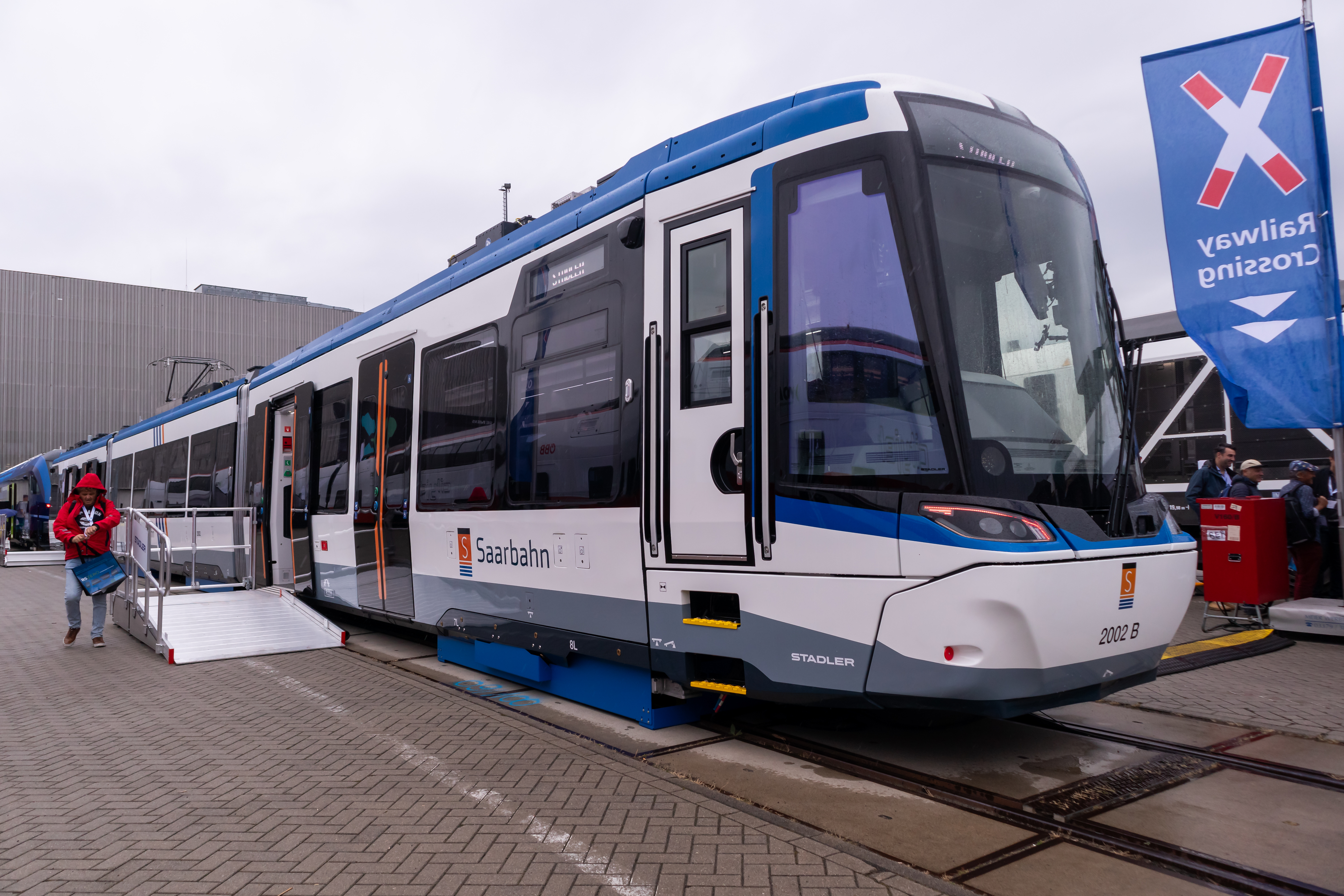
Stadler Citylink tram-train of Saarbahn

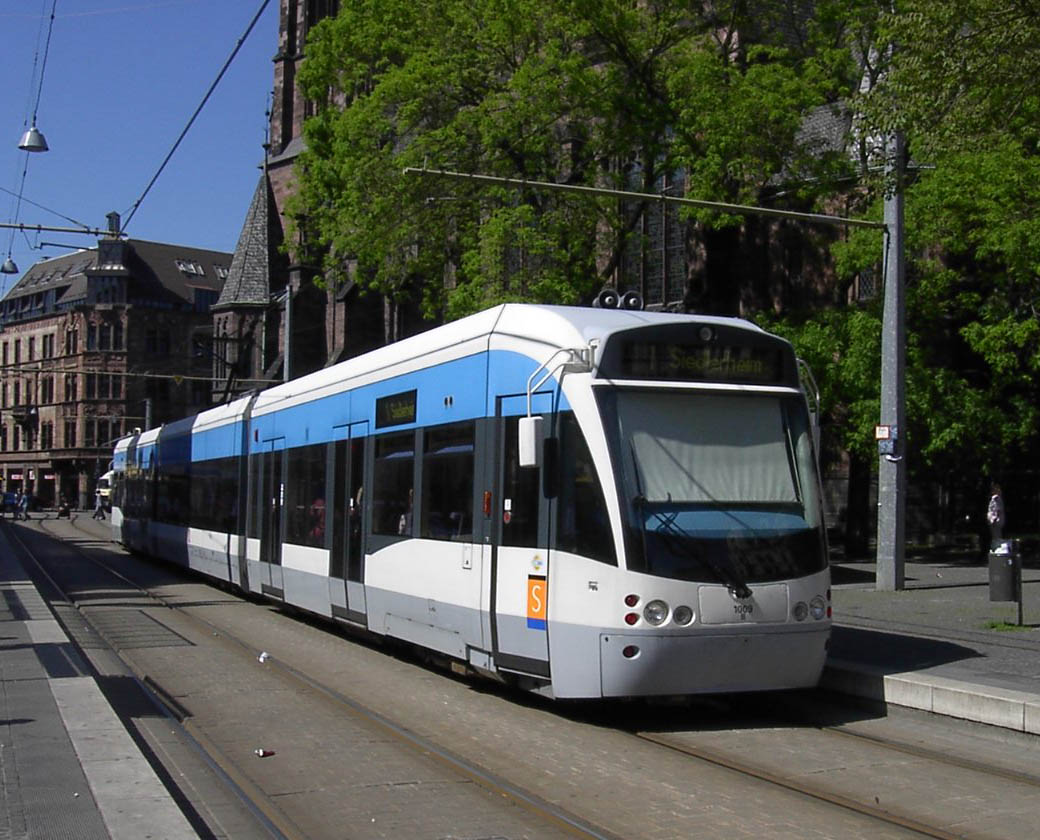
A Saarbahn train near Johanneskirche in central Saarbrücken

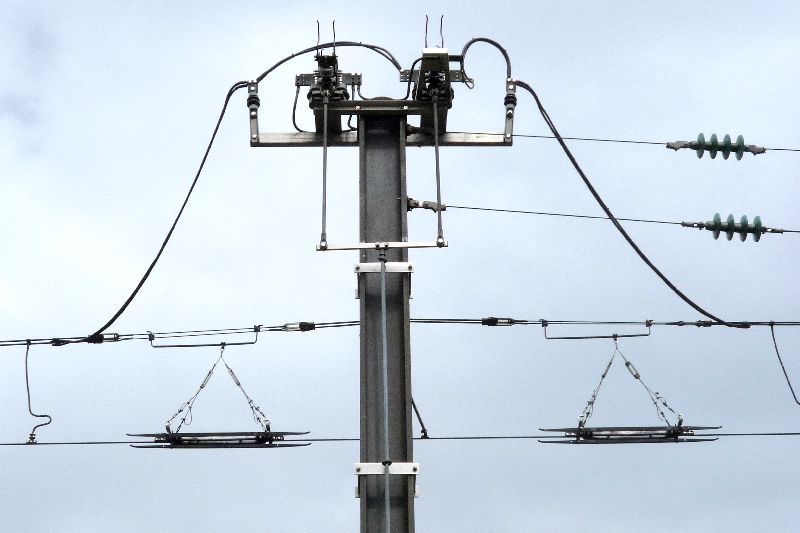
System change in Brebach: Transition from 750-V DC (left) to neutral section (right)

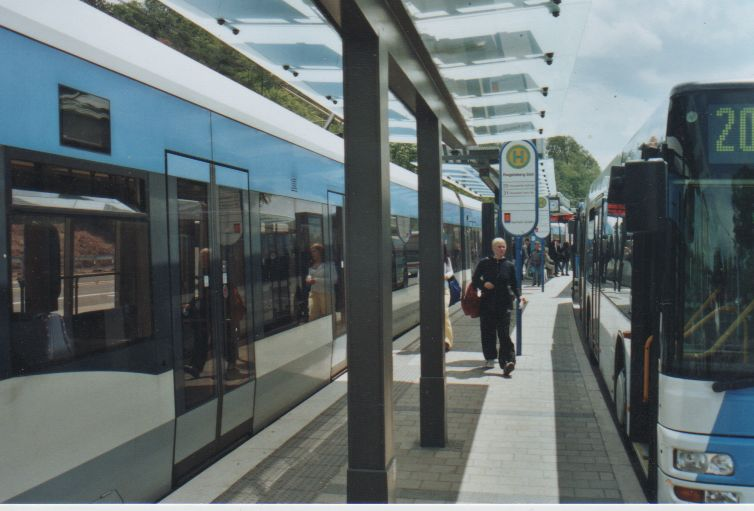
Riegelsberg Süd stop

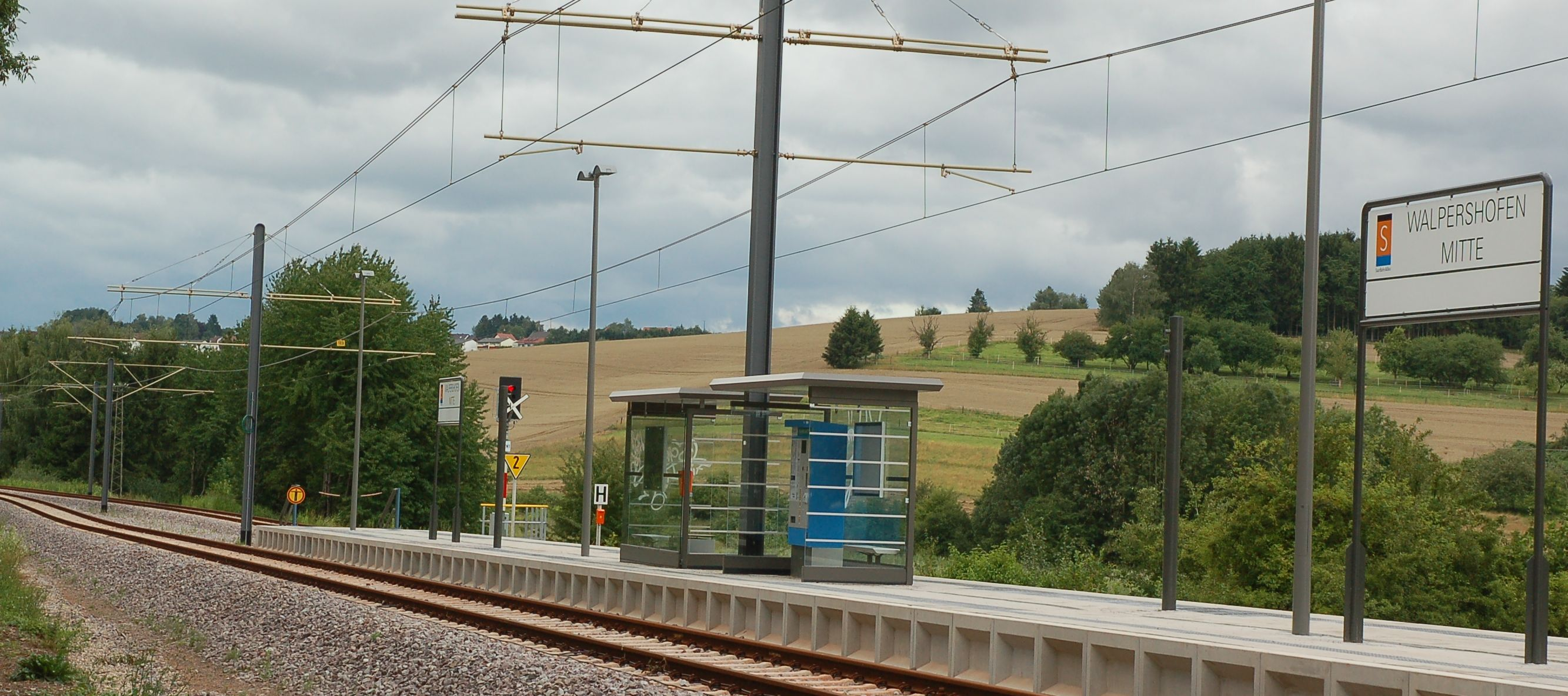
Walpershofen-Mitte stop

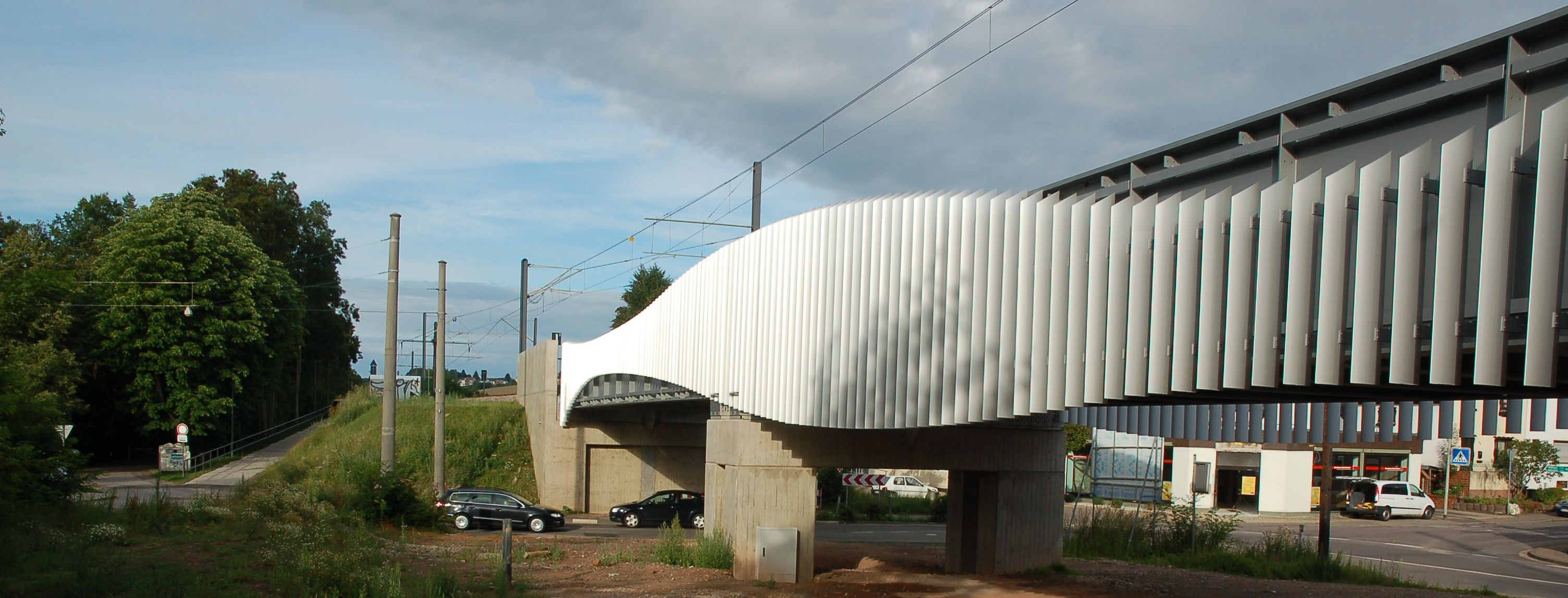
The new overpass of the Saarbahn in Walpershofen

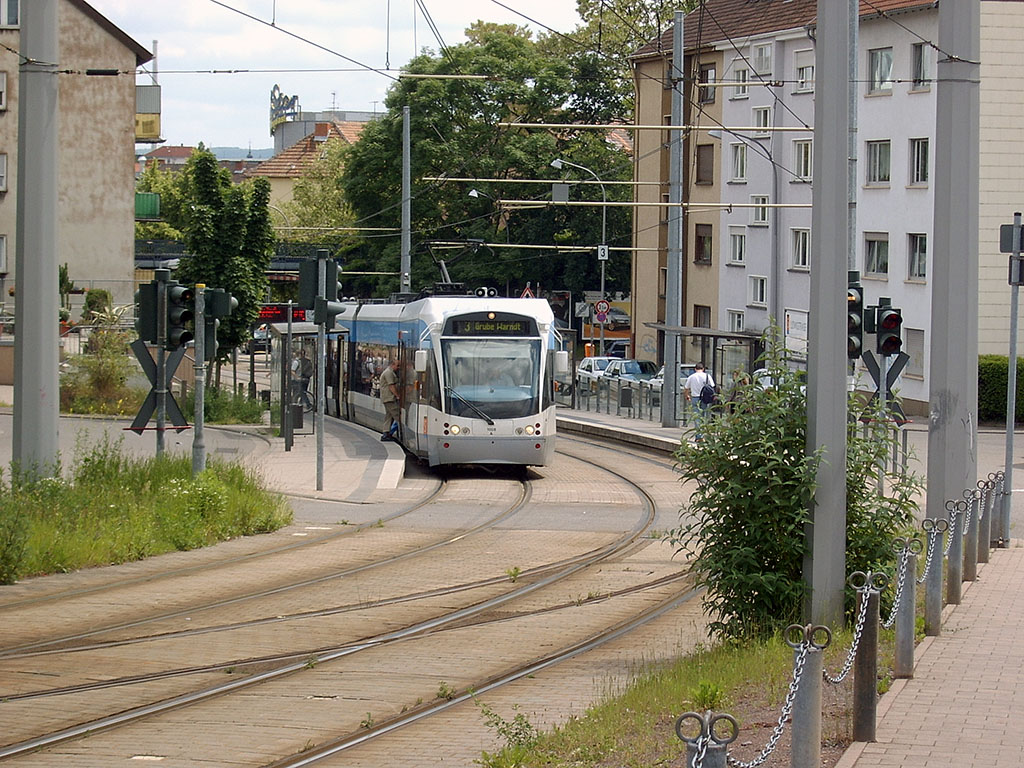
Line 3 towards Grube Warndt just before the system change at the exhibition ground junction

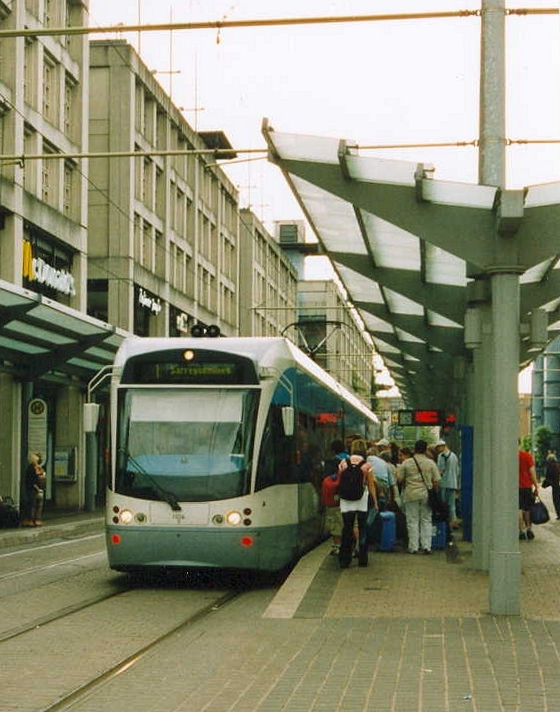
A Saarbahn tram in front of the Europa-Galerie towards Saarbrücker Hauptbahnhof

== Future service ==
A line is proposed towards Schafbrücke. Another proposal would include an extension via Burbach to Völklingen station, but this plan has been put on hold, as the effects of mining have to be remedied first. Other plans include an extension to the University, to Rotenbühl, to Alt-Saarbrücken, to Forbach and to Eschberg. Additionally, an extension from the station Römerkastell to the nearby shopping center Saarbasar is planned. Due to the short distance, the plan is to build the route as single track. As of 2013, no work has been carried out on any of these proposals.
