= Lebach–Völklingen railway =

Railway line in Germany

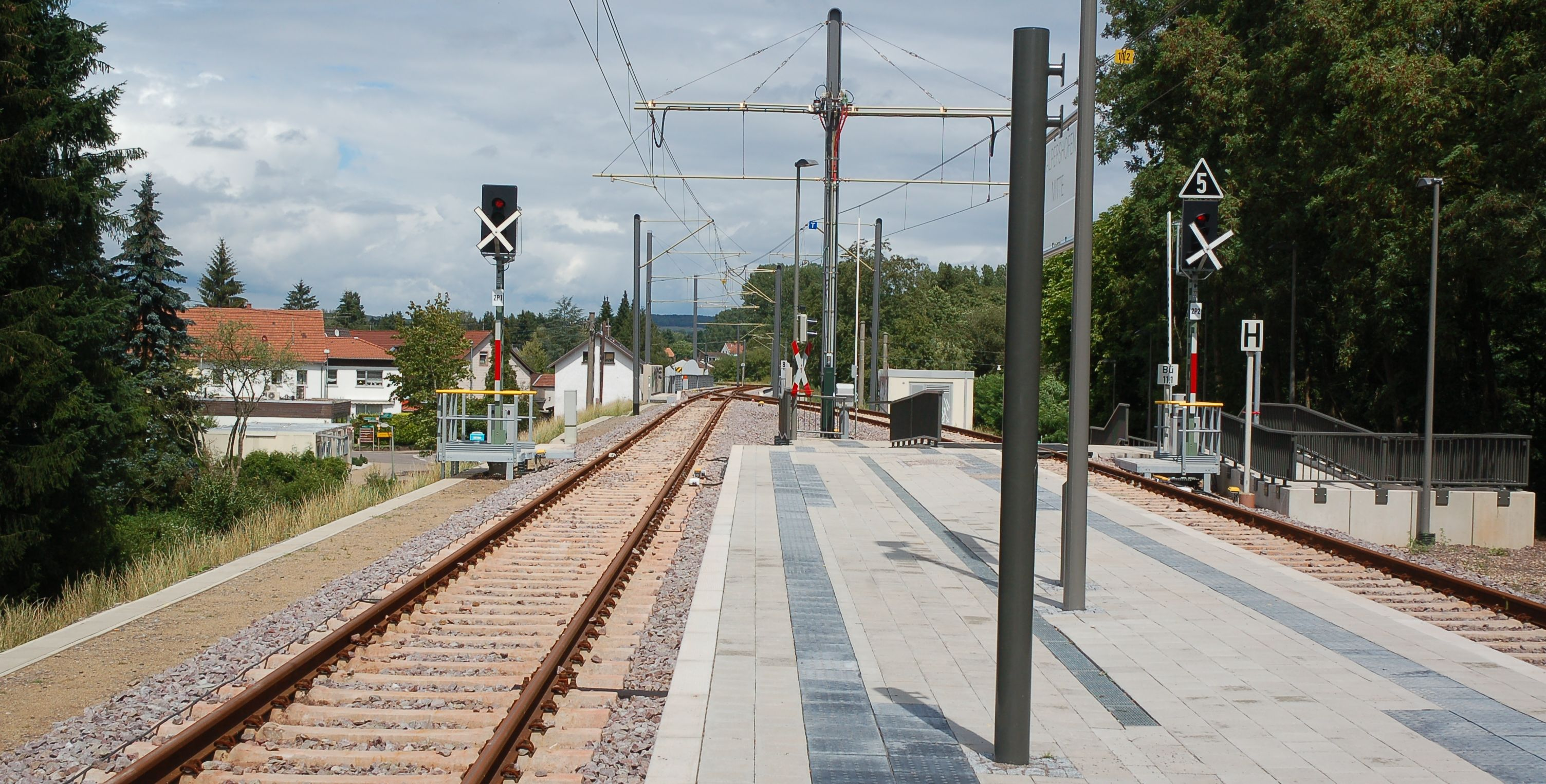
- The reactivated Walpershofen station, now Walpershofen Mitte

Overview
- Line number: 3291

Service
- Route number: 635; 235a (1935); 265e (1944)

Technical
- Line length: 22 km (14 mi)
- Track gauge: 1,435 mm (4 ft 8 1/2 in) standard gauge

The Lebach–Völklingen railway is a single-track branch line that originally ran from Lebach to Völklingen in the German state of the Saarland. It is also called the Köllertalbahn (Koller Valley Railway) because it ran through the Köller valley.

== History ==
Towards the end of the 19th century the towns of the Köller valley were becoming residential areas for ironworkers and miners employed in the Saar region. However, the workers initially had to walk the long distances to their jobs so sought a railway to open up the Köller valley.

After several submissions and petitions the construction of the Koller Valley Railway was approved by the Prussian king under law number 25 on 15 June 1906. Then construction, mainly carried out by Croatian and Italian workers, began in 1909. The southern end of the new line was not connected directly to the Saar line at Völklingen station. Instead, it was connected about two kilometres east of it, near the later Heidstock station, to a line that had existed since 1872, connecting Völklingen to the Grube Viktoria (Victoria pit, named after Victoria, Princess Royal) in Püttlingen.

The whole line was opened on 1 October 1911. Simultaneously, a Grubenanschlussbahn "pit siding" was built from Etzenhofen to the Grube Dilsburg (Dilsburg pit). On 16 November 1911, the first coal train left the mine. The mine railway left Etzenhofen initially parallel to the track of the Köller Valley Railway and ran via Walpershofen to approximately 250 m north of the later Walpershofen station, with the separation of the mining railway from the main line forming a y-shape.

Already in 1914, there was a realignment in Völklingen. The section of track adopted from the Püttlingen mine railway, which crossed over a level crossing over Völklinger Standtrand, later part of the federal highway 51, was abandoned. The new route ran through the newly built Heidstock Tunnel under the road, a few hundred metres east of the old crossing. Directly afterwards it crossed the Saar Line via a bridge, then connected with the southern side of Völklingen station.

During the First World War, the route served military purposes. After the war, there were at first ideas of abandoning the route, especially after the Dilsburg pit was closed in 1931 due to the global economic crisis. After the return of the Saar to Germany in 1935, the Köller Valley Railway had greater use. Up to 28 pairs of trains and up to 8,000 passengers per day used the line in 1936.

The parallel track through Walpershofen was dismantled at this time and a station was opened at Walpershofen. The branch line, which was still in operation despite the closure of the mine, was connected by a set of points directly to the main line.

After the Second World War, the line was not put back into operation over its whole length until a temporary restoration had been carried out on the Eiweiler viaduct in 1947. Passenger numbers declined steadily with the coal and steel crisis of the 1970s. The last regular passenger train ran on the track on 27 September 1985. A special 75-year anniversary run over the Köller Valley Railway was carried out at the initiative of the Arbeitskreises Köllertalbahn (Köller Valley Railway working group) in 1986. The Völklingen–Etzenhofen section was then closed and dismantled. The operation of small freight to industrial enterprises on the line to Etzenhofen was handled from Lebach. There were further farewell trips on the rest of the line on 18 July 1993. The line was then closed and completely dismantled.

The old Püttlingen station was listed as a historic transport monument in 1989. After reconstruction and restoration, it has been used for cultural purposes since 1993.

== Reactivation ==
The section between Walpershofen/Etzenhofen and Heusweiler Markt was reactivated in 2011 and the whole section from Walpershofen/Etzenhofen to Lebach was put back into operation on 5 October 2014 for the Saarbahn.

The line was electrified at 750 Volt DC for this purpose. The Lebach station area was electrified and was extended to Jabach. If electrification is later extended from Illingen, it will be possible to change the current to 15 kV AC.

The trains run during the day every quarter of an hour to Heusweiler Markt and continue to Lebach every half hour. In the peak hour, the trains continue over the Prims Valley Railway to Lebach-Jabach.
