= Prims Valley Railway =

Railway line in Germany

Wemmetsweiler–Nonnweiler railway

Overview
- Line number: 3274 (Wemmetsweiler–Nonnweiler); 3211 (Dillingen–Primsweiler)
- Locale: Saarland, Germany

Service
- Route number: 681, 683; 645 (until 1992); 267 (until 1970); 265k (1944); 236b (1936)

Technical
- Number of tracks: 2: Wemmetsweiler–Illingen
- Track gauge: 1,435 mm (4 ft 8 1/2 in) standard gauge
- Electrification: Wemmetsweiler–Illingen:15 kV/16.7 Hz AC Overhead catenary

The Prims Valley Railway (German: Primstalbahn) is a partly closed railway line that ran south from Nonnweiler to Primsweiler along the upper reaches of the Prims and then turned to the east and ran via Lebach to Neunkirchen in the German state of the Saarland. The Lebach–Neunkirchen section is still operated.

== History ==
It was built in three phases. The first section, which was about eight kilometres long, ran from Neunkirchen to Wemmetsweiler (and from there continued south towards Saarbrücken). It was opened on 15 October 1879 and is now part of the Fischbach Valley Railway.

A Prussian law authorising the construction of the Hermeskeil–Wemmetsweiler line was approved on 10 May 1890. But construction to Hermeskeil did not begin until 15 April 1894. Because the whole line was being constructed simultaneously, the domestic labour market was soon exhausted and foreign workers from Italy and the Balkans had to be used. On 15 May 1897, the section from Wemmetsweiler to Lebach was taken in operation. The remaining 35.6 km to Nonnweiler was opened on 10 December 1897.

The line from the beginning served workers from the thinly populated northern areas of the Saarland. Lines branched In Primsweiler to Dillingen (Saar) in the west, in Lebach to Völklingen over the Lebach–Völklingen railway and in Wemmetsweiler south towards Saarbrücken. Trains from Lebach-Jabach now run over the Wemmetsweiler curve, which was opened in 2006, and over the Fischbach Valley Railway to Saarbrücken. Trains from Illingen run through the new railway junction to Homburg.

Passenger services on the Wadern–Nonnweiler section were closed on 3 October 1959 and freight traffic ended on 30 April 1968. However, few trains had run on this section since 1945. Passenger traffic between Wadern and Lebach and between Dillingen and Wadern ended on 30 May 1980. Regular freight traffic continued to Wadern until 30 May 1992. After this time, the basalt works in Michelbach and the Meiser company in Limbach were served over the Dillingen branch. On 1 January 2005, the siding was sold to the Meiser company. The track is used by the railway company of the Dillinger Hütte (steelworks).

Freight traffic between Primsweiler and Lebach-Jabach ended on 31 December 1987. The section from Nonnweiler to Mariahütte was operated for freight until 1999.

The line between Mariahütte and Wadern was closed in November 1968. The connection curve from Mariahütte to Türkismühle was closed with it. Autobahn 1 now runs on part of the former line between Primstal and Mariahütte. The station buildings of Kastel, Primstal and Krettnich were demolished. The tracks between Wadern and Büschfeld were dismantled after 30 November 1993.

== Route ==
Strictly speaking, the term Primstalbahn (Prims Valley Railway) described only the line between Nonnweiler and Dillingen, which ran along the Prims, not the route from Nonnweiler to Neunkirchen.

Before the Second World War the travel time for the overall route, which was 61 kilometres long, was a little over 120 minutes. This can be explained by the long stops in the stations and the fact that trains had to wait at stations on this single track line for traffic coming the other way. The Dillingen–Primsweiler route was listed in the 1944 timetable as number 265g. Throughout its history, all sections of the line have been used by 2nd and 3rd class passenger services and freight trains.

Nonnweiler was connected to the Hochwald Railway (Hochwaldbahn or High Forest Railway) to Trier and Türkismühle and the Hunsrückquer Railway (Hunsrückquerbahn) to Langenlonsheim.

Today Lebach–Jabach is the end of the line. The old line to Nonnweiler is interrupted by the A1. The old railway embankment does not begin until after the town of Kastel and there are tracks only from Mariahütte.

The section between Wemmetsweiler and Illingen was partially duplicated and one track was electrified in 2004.

The Wemmetsweiler electronic signalling centre took over signalling on the Wemmetsweiler–Lebach line on 30 November 2009.

== Operations ==
After the construction of the Wemmetsweiler curve in 2004, passenger services between Saarbrücken and Lebach–Jabach have been operated with class 628 diesel multiple unit. The old Wemmetsweiler station was abandoned and interchange between services was relocated to Illingen. Class 426 and 425 electric multiple units are operated between Homburg and Illingen.

== Stations ==
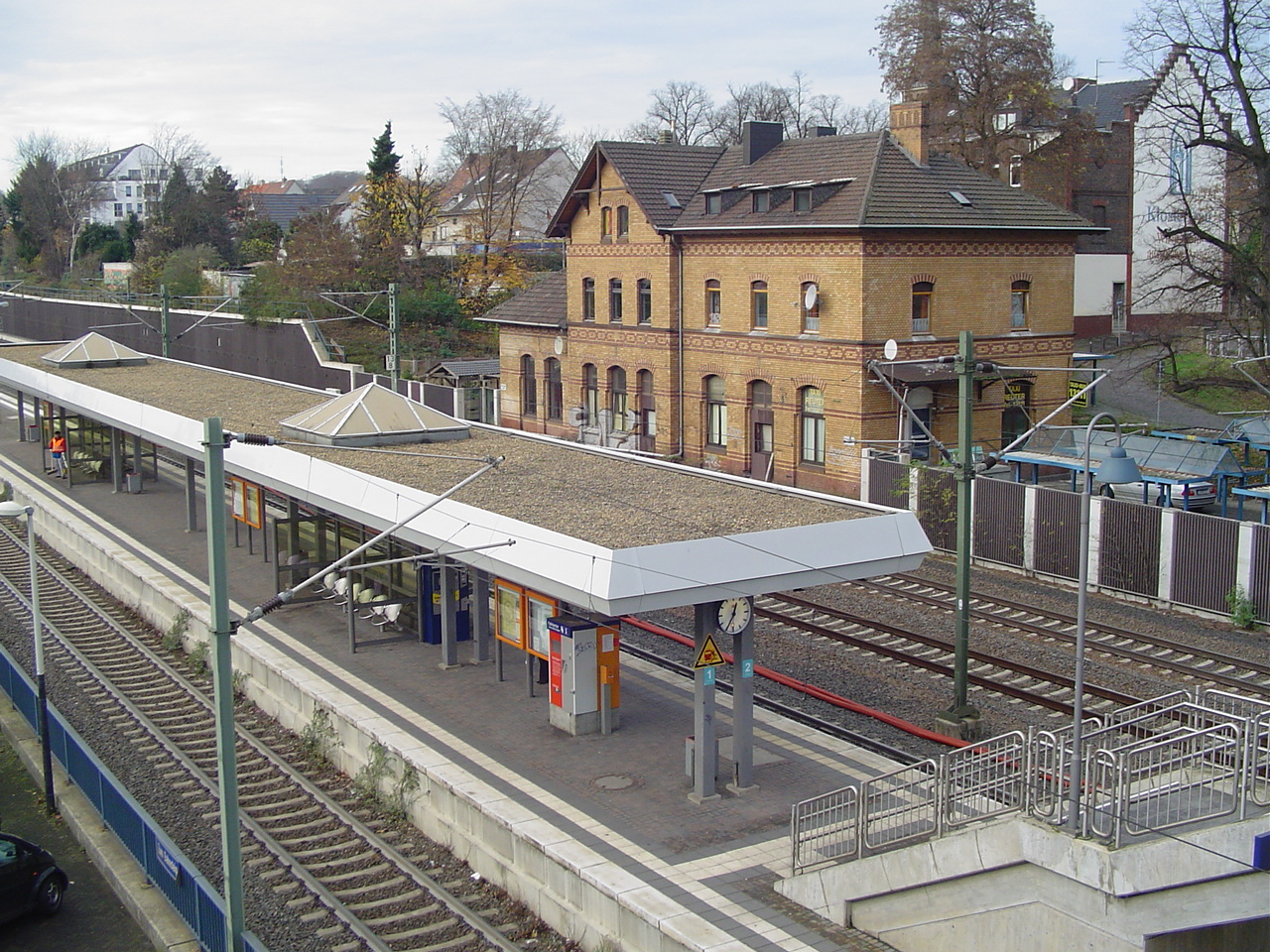
Frechen-Königsdorf S-Bahn stop

The station building of Illingen, Dirmingen, Eppelborn, Lebach, Primsweiler, Schmelz, Wadern- Büschfeld and Wadern-Dagstuhl—as well as the station buildings of the Hochwald Railway at Nonnweiler-Bierfeld and Nonnweiler-Sötern—were all built in 1900 and showed great similarity to each other. It is certain that the buildings were designed and built together. All buildings have exposed brickwork. The only exception is the building in Primsweiler, which was plastered. All buildings have two storeys, simply cut segmented arched windows, stepped corners and capital-like recesses.
