= Saarbrücken Ost station =

Railway station in Saarbrücken, Germany

Saarbrücken Ost
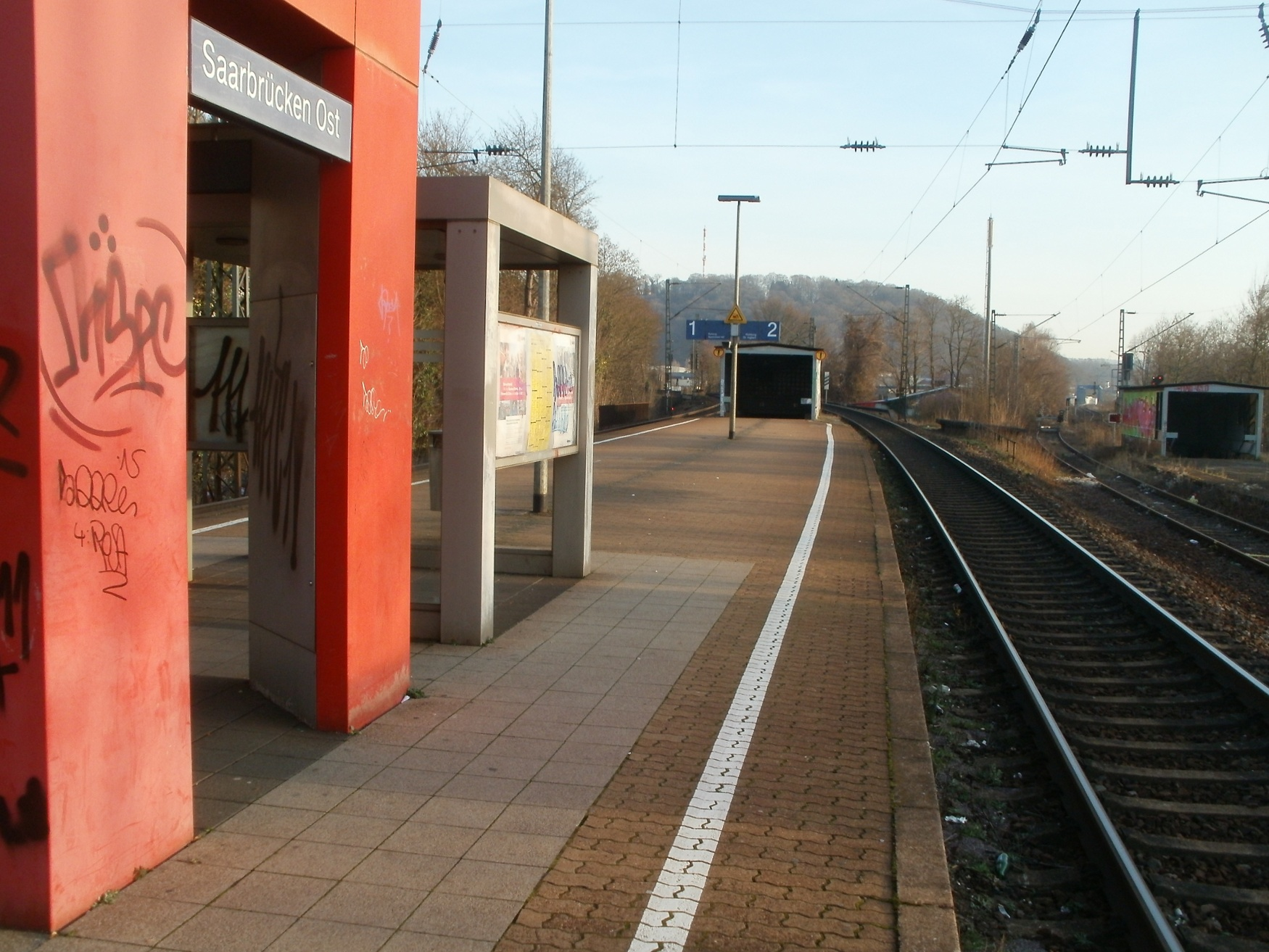

General information
- Location: Am Kieselhumes 1, Saarbrücken, Saarland; Germany
- Coordinates: 49°13′49″N 7°01′07″E
- Lines: Palatine Ludwig Railway (KBS 670); Saarbrücken–Sarreguemines (KBS 684)
- Platforms: 2 (+2 inactive)

Construction
- Accessible: No

Other information
- Station code: 5453
- DS100 code: SSO
- IBNR: 8005241
- Category: 5
- Fare zone: SaarVV: 111
- Website: www.bahnhof.de

Services
Preceding station	DB Regio Mitte	Following station
Saarbrücken Hbf Terminus	RB 68	Sankt Ingbert towards Pirmasens Hbf
Saarbrücken Hbf towards Merzig (Saar)	RB 70	Schafbrücke towards Kaiserslautern Hbf
Saarbrücken Hbf towards Schweich DB	RB 71	Schafbrücke towards Kaiserslautern Hbf
Location

Saarbrücken Ost station is a station in Saarbrücken, the capital of the German state of Saarland, which is served by Regional-Express and Regionalbahn services.

== History ==
The breakpoint was built to connect the districts of Rotenbühl, Kaninchenberg, Sankt Arnual and Eschberg to the local rail network. However, it has lost importance over time. In 1997, platform tracks 3 and 4 were closed for passenger services. Track 3 was converted into a terminating track.

== Architecture ==
The station has been classified as a Haltepunkte (roughly “halt”) since 1960. The entrance building is about four metres high and nine metres wide. It has an entrance to tracks 1 and 2, but the entrance to platform 3 and 4 is closed.

== Rail services ==
Saarbrücken Ost station is served by the following lines:

Line	Route	Frequency
RB 68	Saarbrücken Hbf – Saarbrücken Ost – St. Ingbert – Zweibrücken Hbf – Pirmasens Hbf (once each morning running to Landau (Pfalz) Hbf)	Hourly
RB 70	Merzig (Saar) – Saarlouis – Völklingen – Saarbrücken Hbf – Saarbrücken Ost – St. Ingbert – Homburg (Saar) Hbf – Kaiserslautern	Hourly
RB 71	Trier Hbf – Dillingen (Saar) – Saarlouis Hbf – Saarbrücken Hbf – Saarbrücken Ost – St. Ingbert – Homburg (Saar) Hbf	Hourly
