= Fischbach Valley Railway =

Railway line in Germany

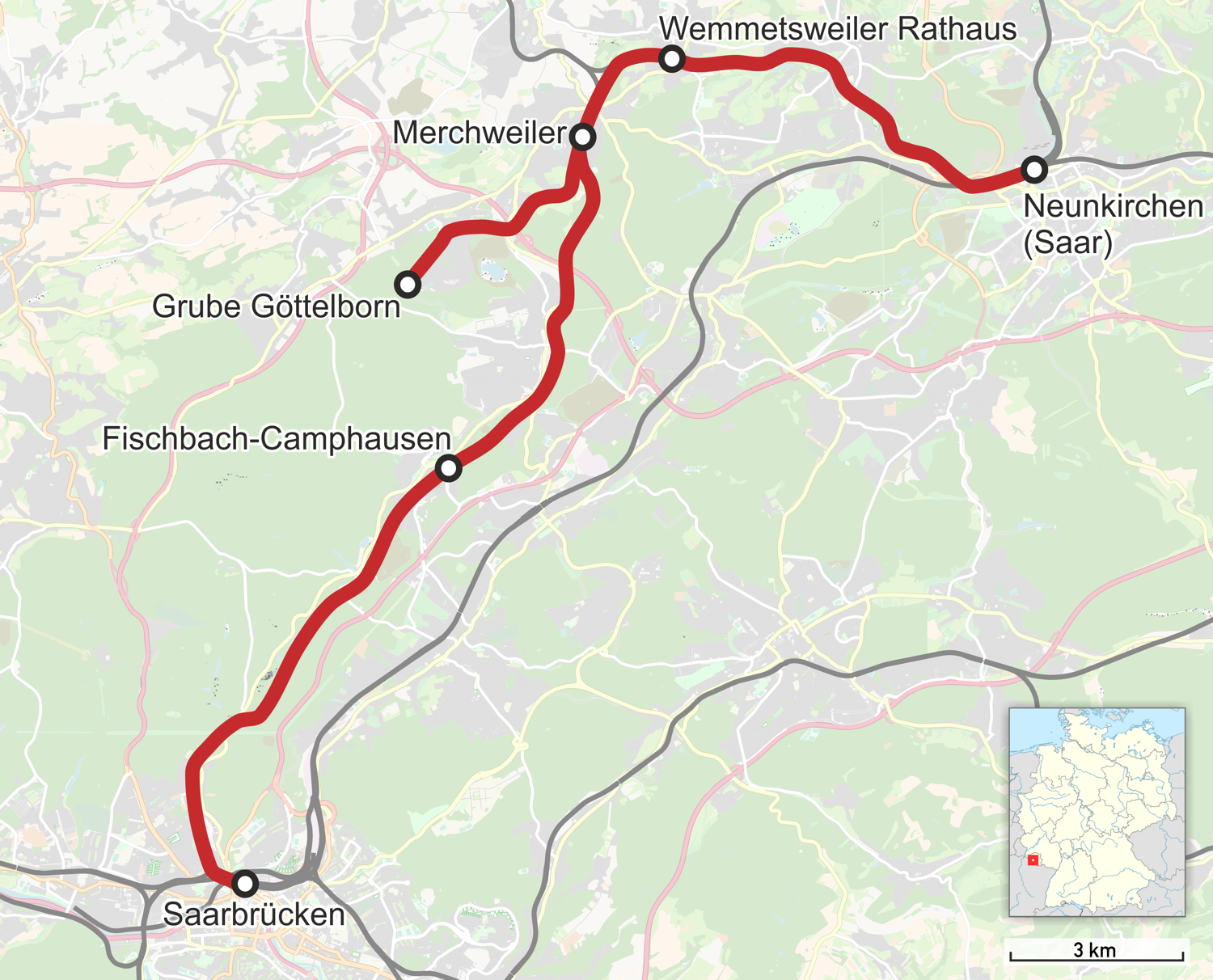

Overview
- Native name: Fischbachtalbahn
- Line number: 3240
- Locale: Saarland, Germany

Service
- Route number: 681

Technical
- Line length: 26.5 km (16.5 mi)
- Number of tracks: 2 (continuous, but not at in Wemmetsweiler Rathaus station)
- Track gauge: 1,435 mm (4 ft 8 1/2 in) standard gauge
- Minimum radius: 190 m (620 ft)
- Electrification: 15 kV/16.7 Hz AC overhead
- Operating speed: 100 km/h (62.1 mph) (maximum)

The Fischbach Valley Railway (German: Fischbachtalbahn, KBS 681) is a railway line in the German state of the Saarland that runs from Saarbrücken along the Fischbache, which flows into the Saar in Saarbrücken, to Wemmetsweiler. Since the opening of the Wemmetsweiler curve in 2003, the line branches west to Lebach as the Prims Valley Railway (Primstalbahn) and east to Neunkirchen.

== History ==
Coal mines were developed in the Fischbach in the early 1870s. Collieries were started at Camphausen in 1871, at Brefeld in 1872 and at Maybach in 1873. During the planning phase some consideration was given to the transport of coal. Initially it was planned that the coal mines would be connected with branch lines to the Sulzbach valley. Since the proposal would have required a tunnel through a ridge, this plan was soon dropped. In addition, the line through the Sulzbach valley was already heavily congested. For this reason it was decided in 1866 to build a line from Neunkirchen to Saarbrücken via the Fischbach valley. In 1873, a license was granted to build the line. Loading of coal at Camphausen mine started in February 1879. The line was opened via Brefeld and Wemmetsweiler to Neunkirchen on 15 October 1879. The branch line to the Maybach colliery was opened on 6 April 1881. When the Göttelborn coal mine was sunk in 1887, a branch line was created from Merchweiler to the Göttelborn colliery, which was opened on 1 October 1891.

In 1965, the entire line was electrified. Following the closure of the Göttelborn mine, the Merchweiler–Göttelborn branch line continues to be used to operate to the Weiher power station. Passenger services have, however, long been focused more on Lebach than on Neunkirchen, requiring passenger trains to reverse in Wemmetsweiler station. To avoid this, a connecting curve (the so-called Wemmetsweiler curve) was planned from the 1990s. In 2003, this curve was constructed, connecting to Illingen. Wemmetsweiler station was closed for passengers in 2006 and replaced by Wemmetsweiler Rathaus station, which is closer to central Wemmetsweiler. The bridge of state road L 128 over the line in Wemmetsweiler was replaced during urban redevelopment by a 54 metre long railway tunnel.
