= Forbach station =

French railway station

Coordinates: 49°11′22″N 6°54′05″E

Forbach
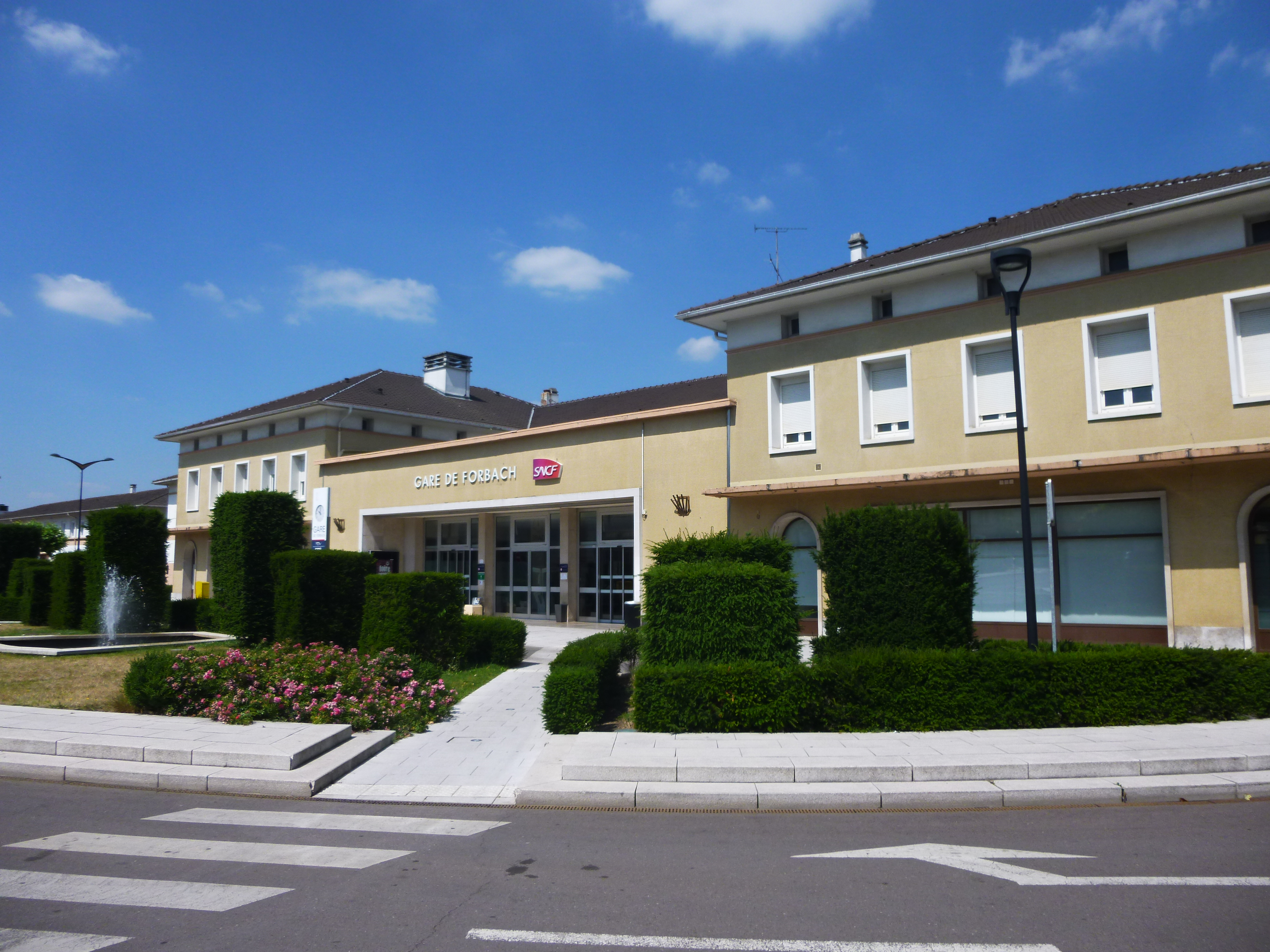

General information
- Location: Place Robert-Schuman; 57600 Forbach, Moselle; France
- Elevation: 220 m (720 ft)
- Owner: SNCF
- Operator: SNCF
- Line: Rémilly–Saarbrücken railway
- Platforms: 2
- Tracks: 3 (+ storage)

Other information
- Station code: 87193003

History
- Opened: 1851

Passengers
- 2018: 327 366

Services
Preceding station	DB Fernverkehr	Following station
Paris Est Terminus	ICE/TGV 82	Saarbrücken Hbf towards Frankfurt (Main) Hbf
Preceding station	TER Grand Est	Following station
Béning towards Metz	L15	Saarbrücken Hbf Terminus
Location

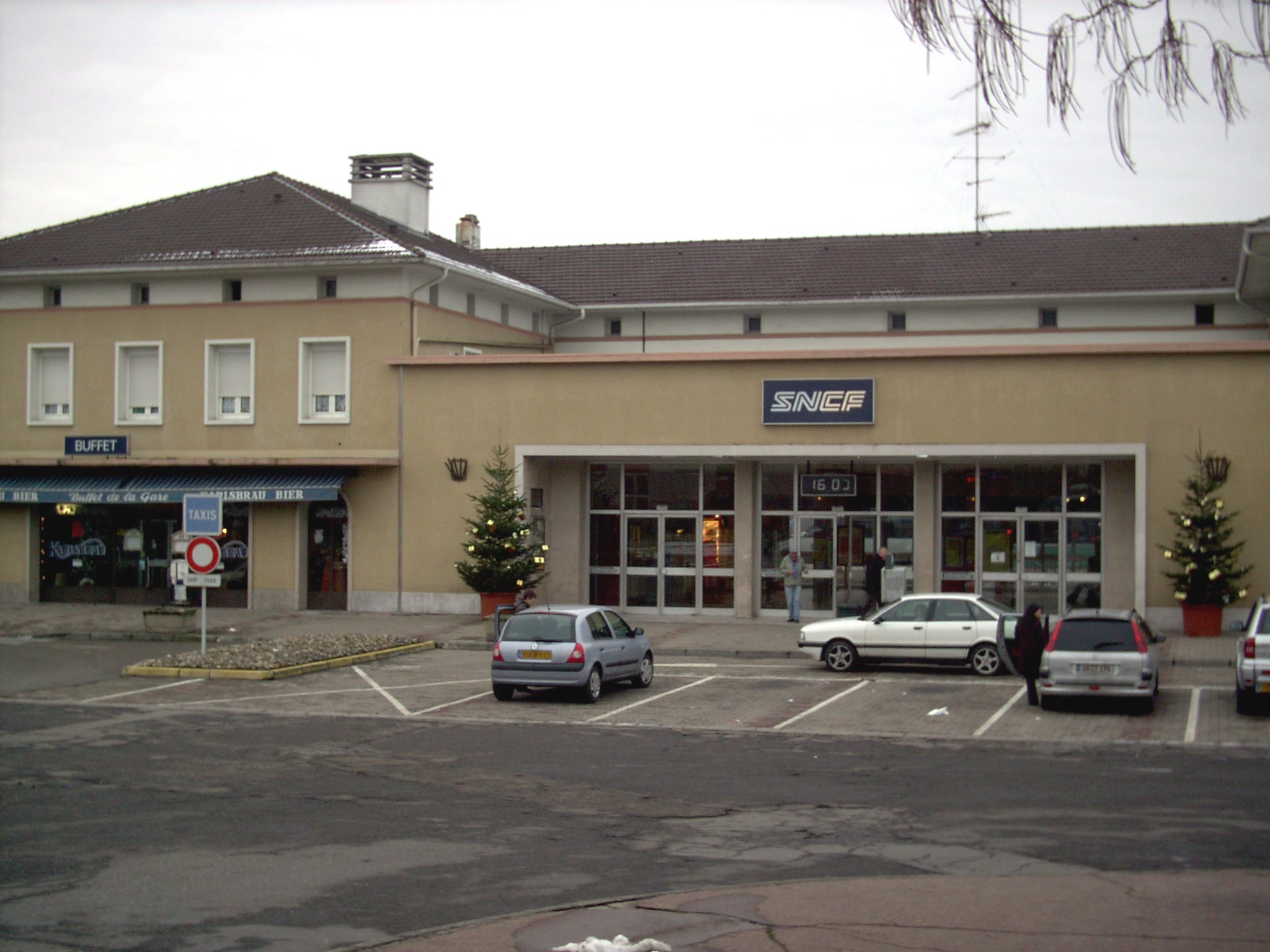
The station building in 2003.

Forbach railway station (French: Gare de Forbach) is a railway station in Forbach in the Moselle department of north-eastern France. It is the last station in France before the German border at Saarbrücken.

== Services ==
The station is served by the ICE 82 ICE service and the regional L15 service as of 2022:

== See also ==
- List of border crossing points in France
