= Saarbrücken–Sarreguemines railway =

Railway line in Germany and France

Overview
- Line number: 3251 (Germany); 163 000 (France)
- Locale: Saarland, Germany and France

Service
- Route number: 684; 639 (1985 timetable); 284 (1944 timetable); 235f (1937 timetable)

Technical
- Line length: 18 km (11 mi)
- Track gauge: 1,435 mm (4 ft 8 1/2 in) standard gauge
- Electrification: 15 kV 16.7 Hz AC

The Saarbrücken–Sarreguemines railway (also known in German as the Obere Saartalbahn, Upper Saar Valley Railway) is a two-track main line railway, running from Saarbrücken in the German state of the Saarland to Sarreguemines just over the border in France. The route runs along the Saar to Sarreguemines.

== History ==
A treaty was contracted between Prussia and France to build the border crossing at Sarreguemines on 18 June 1867. The line was completed in 1869, but since the connecting line from Sarreguemines to Hagenau was still under construction, the first locomotive ran over the Prussian bridge between Hanweiler and Sarreguemines on 23 May 1870.

On 1 June 1870 the line was officially opened in the presence of German and French government officials. A Prussian and French military band played together in Saarbrücken station. A few weeks later, on 16 July 1870, the last passenger train ran from Sarreguemines, subjected to stone-throwing by the French during the lead up to the Franco-Prussian War.

The line was originally intended to be part of a longer line, running from Brussels to Basel via Saarbrücken. After the Franco-Prussian War 1870–1871, this plan lost its importance as the Luxembourg–Metz–Basel railway line was now entirely under German control. In the 1940s there was an express service between Cologne and Strasbourg on the line, but the line has never had much significance for long-distance traffic.

On 20 June 1960, the line was one of the first lines in the Saarland to be electrified, when it was electrified to Brebach station. On 11 September 1981 electrification was extended to the border near Hanweiler-Bad Rilchingen. As of September 1983 electric operations were extended to platform 1 of Sarreguemines station. As the rest of the station is not electrified, it can be run on the German catenary supply system without changing voltage. The second track between Hanweiler and Saargemünd was removed because of the narrowness of the Prussian Bridge.

Since 1997, the line has been operated as part of the Saarbahn Stadtbahn service; Regional-Express services also run between Saarbrücken and Strasbourg.

A Bübingen Nord station was planned originally on the line between the stations of Bübingen and Güdingen. This was shown on the line map, but was abandoned because of its cost.

== Route ==
Starting at Saarbrücken station, the line runs at first parallel with the Palatine Ludwig Railway (Pfälzische Ludwigsbahn) to Saarbrücken-Ost station. This halt is only served by trains on track 1 to 2 and is not a scheduled stop any longer for trains on the Saarbrücken–Sarreguemines line, which uses track 4. Here the line branches off to the south. In 1997, a connection was built from the Saarbahn (the Saar's Stadtbahn) line from Römerkastell to the Saarbrücken–Sarreguemines line between Saarbrücken Ost and Brebach. Until 1945, there was also a siding from the Palatine Ludwig Railway to Römerkastell, but this was not rebuilt after the destruction of a road bridge during the war. Brebach station is still responsible for the operation to the Halberg iron works (Halbergerhütte). Stadtbahn sets are parked on the extensive network of rail tracks there. Until the 1990s, there was a siding from Brebach to the Römerbrücke power station, the wholesale market, and some private businesses. Reactivation of this line is now under discussion. A railway bridge was built over the River Saar in 1975, especially to connect to the German operations centre of Peugeot in the Güdingen/Unner district. By the autumn of 2005, all of these sidings had been dismantled except for the siding to the Halberg iron works. The Saar bridge was closed in 2003.

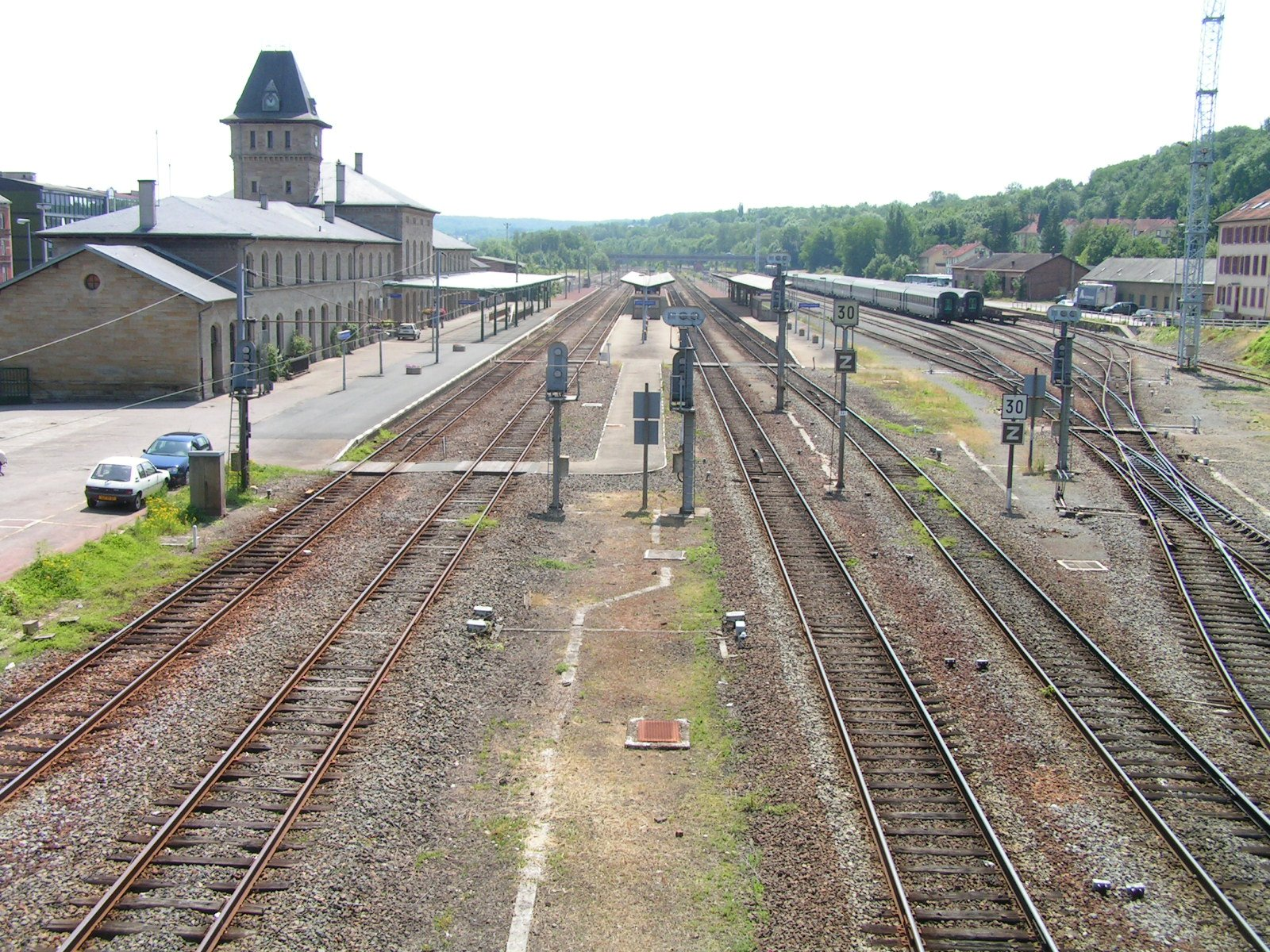
View of Sarreguemines, on the left is track 1 electrified with the 15 kV overhead system of Deutsche Bahn

After Brebach the line runs in viewing distance of the Saar. The station building at Güdingen was demolished in 2006. There were also some sidings in Bübingen, which were abandoned in 2007. Kleinblittersdorf station has been rebuilt in recent years and a third terminating track has been installed, which can also be used by Saarbahn trains in coupled sets. The former station building is now privately owned. The new platforms were moved a few metres to the south and combined with a modern bus station. Here, too, former private railway sidings have now been dismantled. The lime works of Saarstahl (Saar steel) is in Auersmacher, which is served more than once a day by trains carrying lime to Völklingen. A small diesel locomotive is still based there especially for shunting.

Hanweiler station operates as a border station, but it has now lost most of its tracks. The line becomes a single track before the station and crosses the Saar and the border with France over the Prussian bridge. The line ends at platform 1 of Sarreguemines station.

== Rail services ==
The focus of operations on the line is local and regional traffic in the Upper Saar. Traditionally, for decades there were also several express services each day between Saarbrücken and Strasbourg. Today the line is used by Saarbahn services. The regional traffic from Saarbrücken to Strasbourg via Saargemünd is operated with identical Alstom Coradia LINT diesel multiple units by Deutsche Bahn (class 641) and SNCF (Class X 73900).

The formerly extensive freight operations (mainly coal trains to France) is confined to and from the Halberg iron works and the Halberg-Guss company in Brebach. In addition, several times a day broken slag is carried from the Saarstahl underground mine in Auersmacher to Völklingen.
