= Saarbrücken Hauptbahnhof =

Railway station in Saarbrücken, Germany

Saarbrücken Hbf
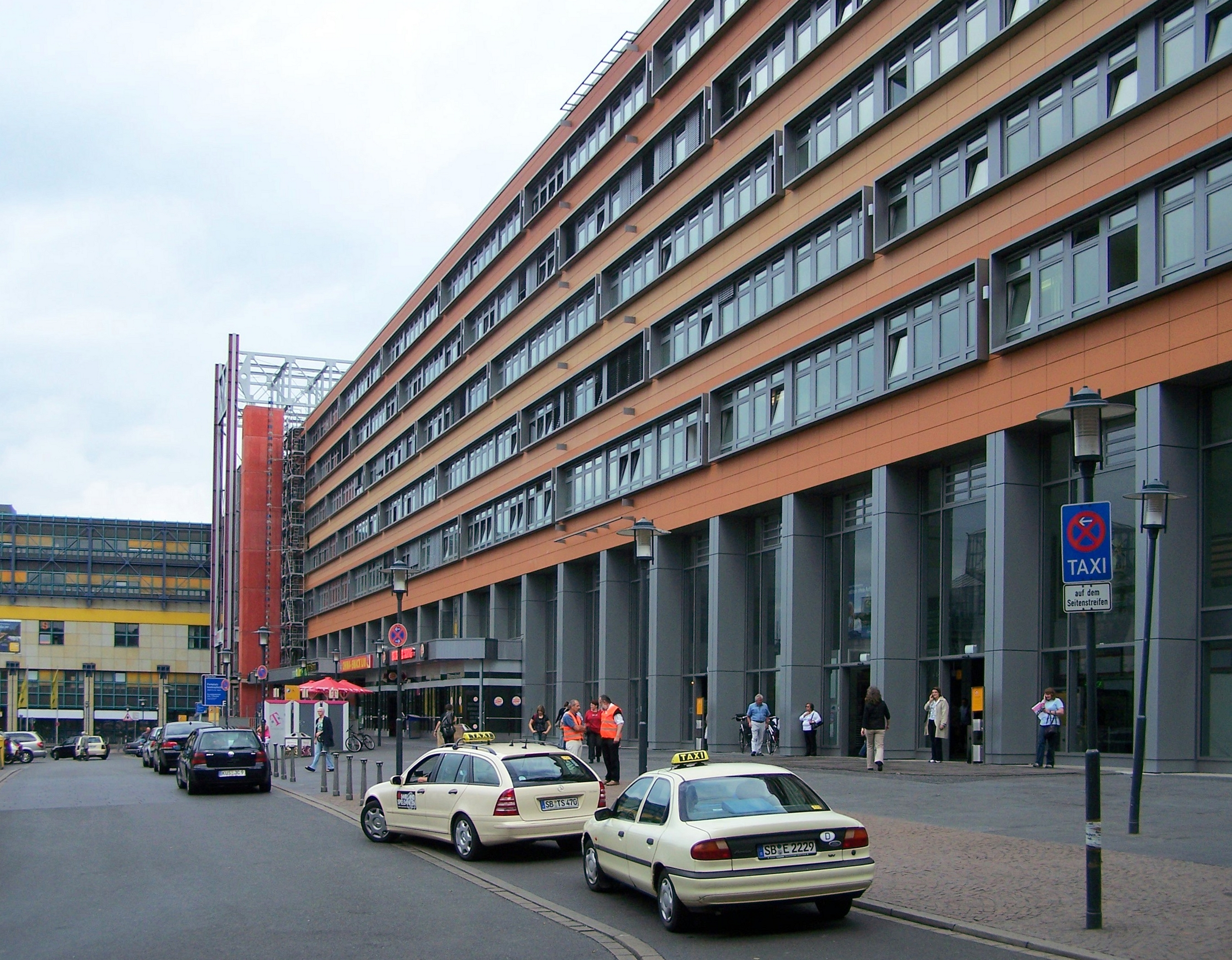

General information
- Location: Am Hauptbahnhof 6-12, Saarbrücken, Saarland; Germany
- Coordinates: 49°14′29″N 6°59′26″E
- Owner: DB Netz
- Operator: DB Station&Service
- Lines: Saarbrücken-Metz (KBS 682); Saarbrücken-Ludwigshafen (KBS 670); Saarbrücken-Pirmasens (KBS 674); Saarbrücken-Mainz (KBS 680); Saarbrücken-Lebach (KBS 681); Saarbrücken-Sarreguemines (KBS 684); Saarbrücken-Trier (KBS 685)
- Platforms: 10 through platforms; 4 bay platforms; 4 tram platforms (station forecourt)

Construction
- Accessible: Yes

Other information
- Station code: 5451
- DS100 code: SSH
- IBNR: 8000323
- Category: 2
- Fare zone: SaarVV: 111
- Website: www.bahnhof.de

History
- Opened: 16 November 1852

Passengers
- <50,000 (excluding the Stadtbahn)

Services
Preceding station	DB Fernverkehr	Following station
Terminus	ICE 3 Sprinter	Homburg (Saar) Hbf towards Berlin Südkreuz
Terminus	ICE 15	Homburg (Saar) Hbf towards Ostseebad Binz
Terminus	ICE 60	Homburg (Saar) Hbf towards München Hbf
Forbach towards Paris Est	ICE/TGV 82	Kaiserslautern Hbf towards Frankfurt (Main) Hbf
Preceding station	DB Regio Mitte	Following station
Völklingen towards Koblenz Hbf	RE 1 Südwest-Express	Sankt Ingbert towards Heidelberg Hbf
Terminus	RB 68	Saarbrücken Ost towards Pirmasens Hbf
Saarbrücken-Burbach towards Merzig (Saar)	RB 70	Saarbrücken Ost towards Kaiserslautern Hbf
Saarbrücken-Burbach towards Schweich DB	RB 71	Saarbrücken Ost towards Kaiserslautern Hbf
Saarbrücken-Burbach towards Niedaltdorf	RB 77 One Sunday service only	Terminus
Preceding station	Vlexx	Following station
Terminus	RE 3	Neunkirchen Hbf towards Frankfurt (Main) Hbf
Fischbach-Camphausen towards Lebach-Jabach	RB 72	Terminus
Terminus	RB 73	Jägersfreude towards Neubrücke (Nahe)
Terminus	RB 76	Fischbach-Camphausen towards Homburg Hbf
Preceding station	TER Grand Est	Following station
Terminus	A06 (RE 19)	Sarreguemines towards Strasbourg
Forbach towards Metz	L15 (RE 18)	Terminus
Location

Saarbrücken Hauptbahnhof or Saarbrücken Central Station also called Eurobahnhof Saarbrucken, is the principal railway station in the German city of Saarbrücken and the largest station in the Saarland, a German state on the border with France. Around 10 million passengers use the station annually. The station is operated by DB Station&Service as a category 2 station, served by regional and long-distance trains.

== History ==
Saarbrücken's central station was opened on 16 November 1852 as St Johann-Saarbrücken. The present city of Saarbrücken emerged later from the amalgamation of (old) Saarbrücken, St Johann, Malstatt and St. Arnual. The station was on the Saarbrücken railway, which ran from Bexbach via Neunkirchen (Saar) and Stieringen to the French Eastern Railway. The 56-metre (184 ft) long, 13.50-metre (44 ft 3 in) wide sandstone building was between the two tracks with access by an underpass, there being, unusually for that time, no track crossing.

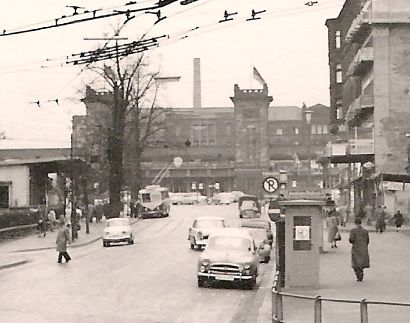
Forecourt of Saarbrücken Hauptbahnhof in September 1957

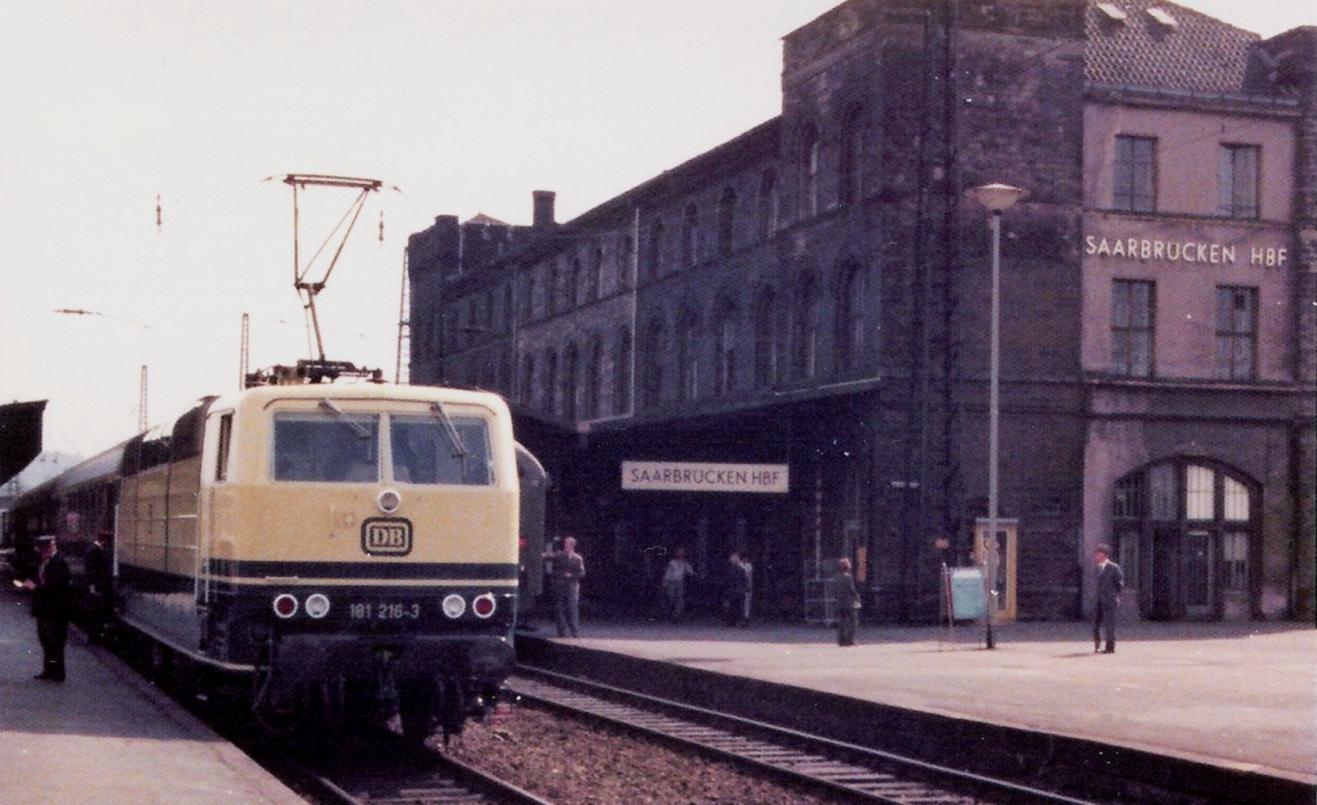
Former 'island building' at Saarbrücken Hauptbahnhof with twin-system electric locomotive 181 216 on 10 September 1975

As the railway facilities continued to grow, so the station building was also enlarged. In 1891/1893 a station entrance building with two striking towers was erected in front of the tunnel, and in 1908 there were plans to build a completely new station building. This was to begin in 1914, but the outbreak of the First World War put paid to the plans. In 1932, Saarbrücken handled 453 daily arrivals and departures, of which 51 were express trains, the second-largest number of trains on the Reichsbahn, after Leipzig. After the reannexation of the Saarland in 1935, plans for a new station restarted in earnest. This was to be completed by 1941, but again the war prevented them coming to fruition.

In the Second World War 80% of the railway facilities in Saarbrücken were destroyed. Of the entrance building only the two towers remained, and other buildings like the locomotive shed (Bahnbetriebswerk) were totally destroyed. In the station yard there was not a single through track left. Under US direction, today's track 19 was provisionally restored. Over this track the US troops ran their supply trains towards Neunkirchen-Bexbach-Homburg under their own management and running on sight.

The two towers of the entrance building were linked in 1952 by a flat-roofed building and this formed a temporary structure for many years thereafter. In the 1960s fresh plans were made for a new reception and administrative building. The first sod was turned on 27 June 1963 by the Mayor of Saarbrücken, Fritz Schuster, and the President of the Bundesbahn railway division, Alois Meyer. In the same year the remains of the old entrance building were removed. In September 1967 the new 120-metre (390 ft)-long, 26-metre (85 ft)-high building was inaugurated. On the two-storey-high ground floor were the main hall, luggage check-in, shops and a restaurant; on the upper floors of the seven-storey building were the computer centre, medical services, offices and staff canteen.

In February 1960 electric train services began on the Forbach-Homburg.

In 1977 work on a thorough modernisation was begun. Amongst other things the platforms were raised to a height of 760 mm. In order to create space for more through tracks, the first station building from 1852, the so-called 'island building', was demolished between 18 September 1978 and March 1979.

== Saarbrücken 21 ==
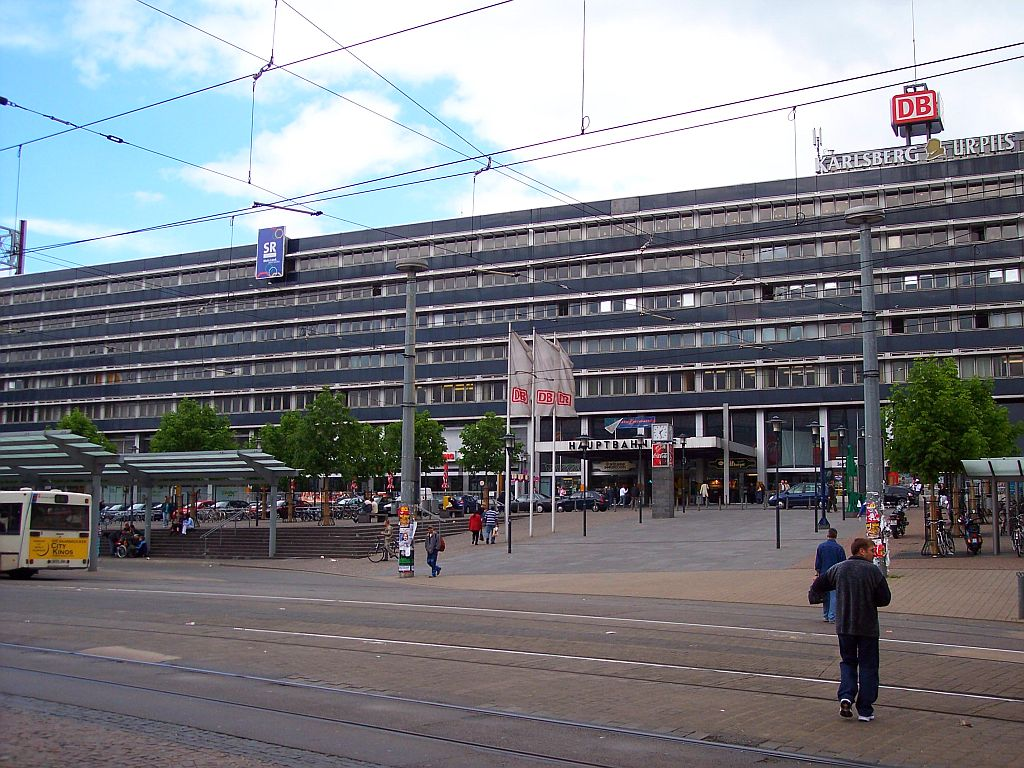
The station before modernisation

The Eurobahnhof (or Eurostation) is the name of the Saarbrücken 21 project to modernise the station. The existing station and surrounding land was rebuilt. In June 2007 an important milestone during the work was passed with the opening of the Paris-Eastern France-Southern Germany (POS) high-speed route, providing services to Stuttgart and Frankfurt, the latter from Saarbrücken.

Key changes included a new southern façade for the station building, a newly designed entrance hall and pedestrian underpass, new lifts and a new access to the station from the north from the district of Rodenhof. The cost of about €31 million was shared between the state capital of Saarbrücken, the Saarland and Deutsche Bahn AG.

The extensive network of tracks north of the station was largely removed; east of the station tracks were relaid in a different layout and modernised. New train maintenance and storage facilities were constructed within a relatively compact space. The area freed up is intended to be used for car parking and a new industrial estate, the "Eurostation Estate" or Quartier Eurobahnhof. The construction of access roads to the site and efforts to attract businesses have proved to be protracted processes, and will take a long time yet. The large Servicepoint (tickets and catering) set up by DB AG at the north entrance was closed shortly afterwards because of low customer demand.

The first sod was turned on 5 May 2006 and the official opening ceremony of the modernised station took place on 15 December 2007. A year later, however, the station was still not ready; containerised shops and building materials cluttered the station forecourt, and rats were also frequently seen there, much to the consternation of the local population and passengers.

=== Reception hall/city entrance ===
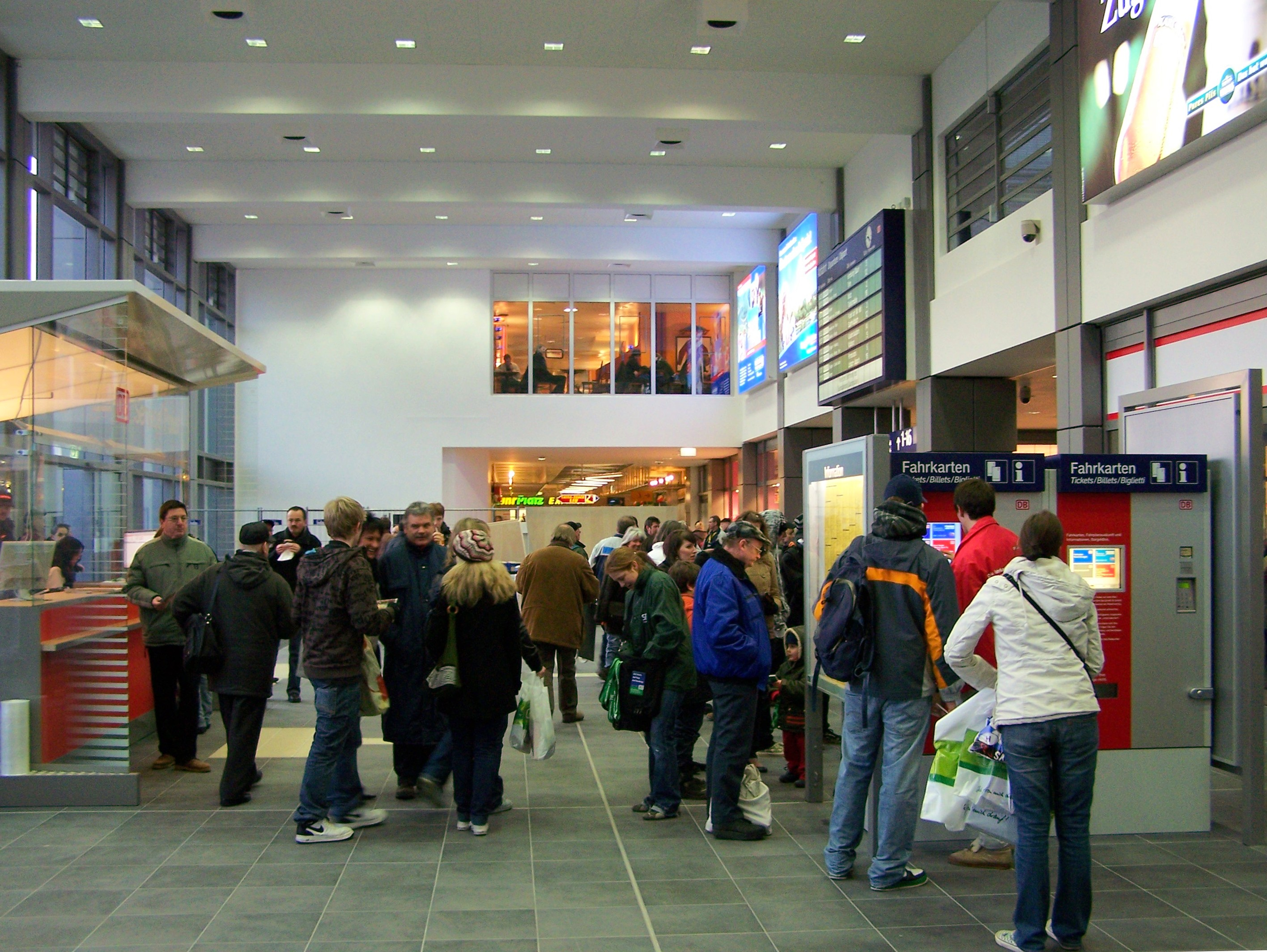
View inside the entrance hall

Now that it has become a Eurostation, Saarbrücken Hauptbahnhof opens onto the city and the pedestrian zone (Reichsstraße/Bahnhofstraße) via a large reception hall. This has rows of shops on two floors which sell everyday fare and popular goods. The shops include a supermarket, fast-food restaurant, newsagents and stationers, tobacconists, florists and more), the DB Service Point, the DB/Ameropa travel centre and a terminal with DB ticket machines.

In front of the city entrance is the large station forecourt, mostly traffic-free, numerous bicycle stands and the four-track Hauptbahnhof tram stop of the Saarbrücken Stadtbahn (Saarbahn), from which run 290 services per day to France/Kleinblittersdorf/Südstadt/Innenstadt and Riegelsberg/Nordstadt. Hundreds of town and regional buses also stop here.

=== Pedestrian tunnel / Lower level ===
All 16 platforms are accessible via the fully renovated pedestrian tunnel and via the Osttunnel. This is about 100 metres (330 ft) long and climbs gently from the City entrance hall to the new North entrance in the district of Rodenhof, and is decorated in plain blue and white shades of colour.

All the platforms are barrier-free and apart from platforms 1-3 are each accessible by lift, escalator and stairs; platforms 1-3 are accessible by staircase and lift.

=== North terminal / Rodenhof north exit ===
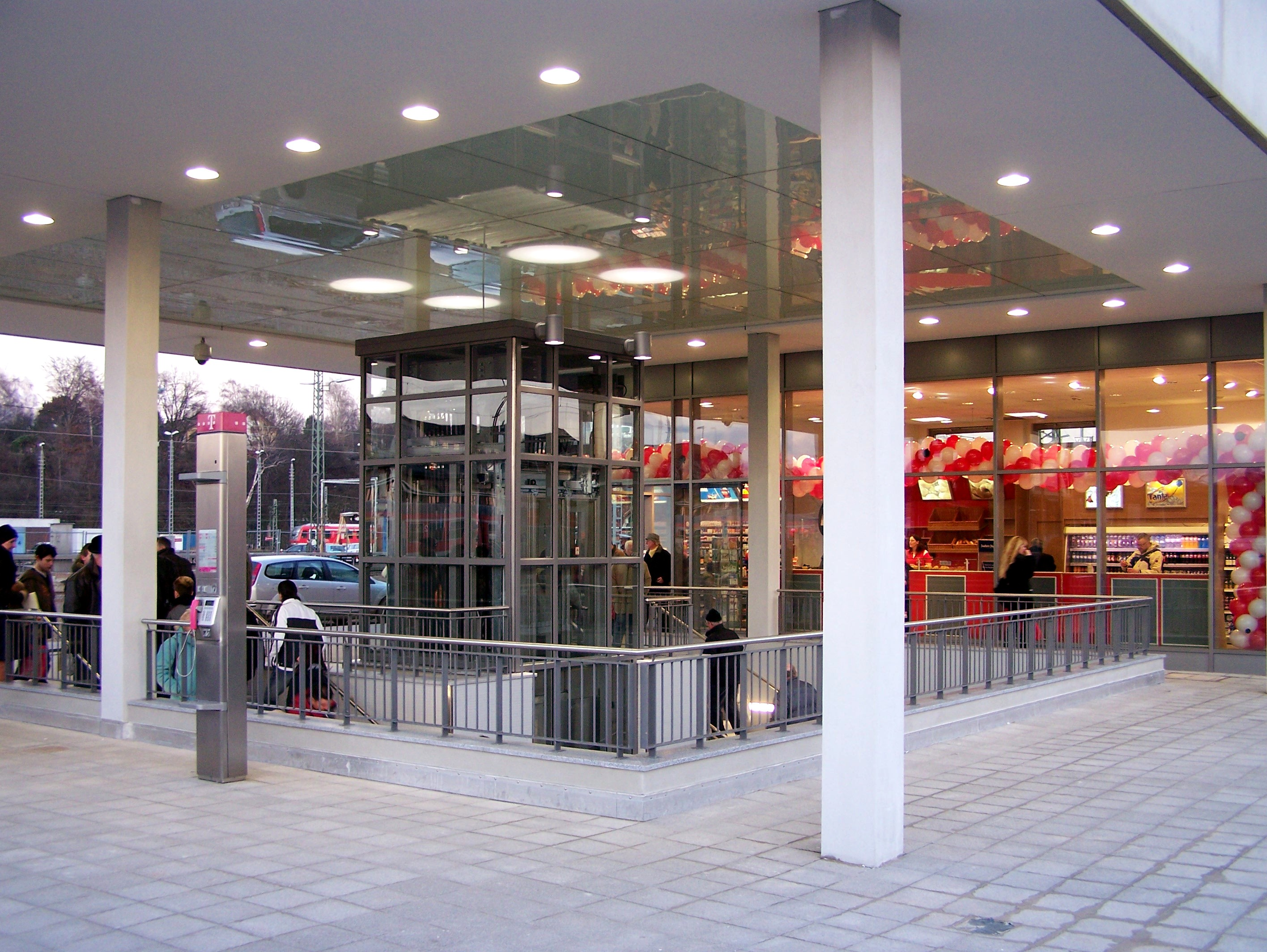
North terminal

Together with the renovation and rebuilding work as part of the Saarbrücken 21 (Eurobahnhof) project, the pedestrian tunnel, which previously ended at platform 16, and to about 2001 at platform 22, was extended into the district of Rodenhof. There a new entrance was built, the North Terminal, which connects to a new Park & Ride area with several hundred spaces; a direct connexion to the Ludwigsbergkreisel and from there to the A 1, A 620 and A 623 motorways is planned. If required the DB-Servicepoint may be opened again.

=== Platforms ===
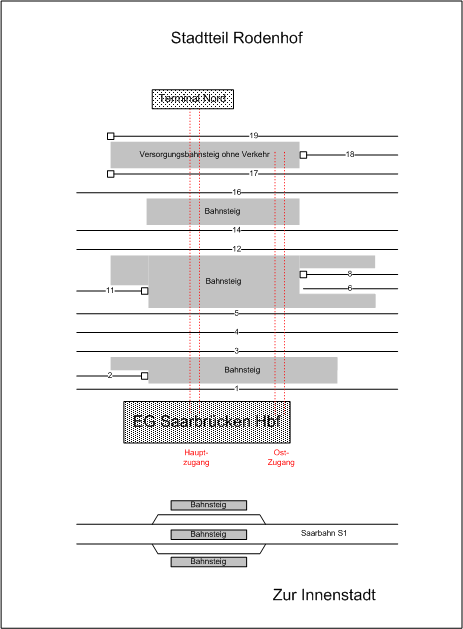
2008 track layout

The platforms (apart from the tram lines in front of the City entrance) are about 20 metres above the pedestrian tunnel that links the two station entrances. The tracks are numbered 1–16, of which only ten are used for passenger trains; these are numbers 1–3, 5–6, 8, 11–12, 14 and 16. The other tracks are for other railway operations or no longer exist. Amongst the ten tracks used for passenger services are six through tracks, that are used by trains passing through Saarbrücken, and four bay platforms (2, 6, 8, 11), at which train services begin or terminate.

=== Reference projects ===
- Frankfurt 21
- Stuttgart 21

== Traffic connexions ==
In the 2026 timetable, the following services stop at the station.

=== Long-distance services ===
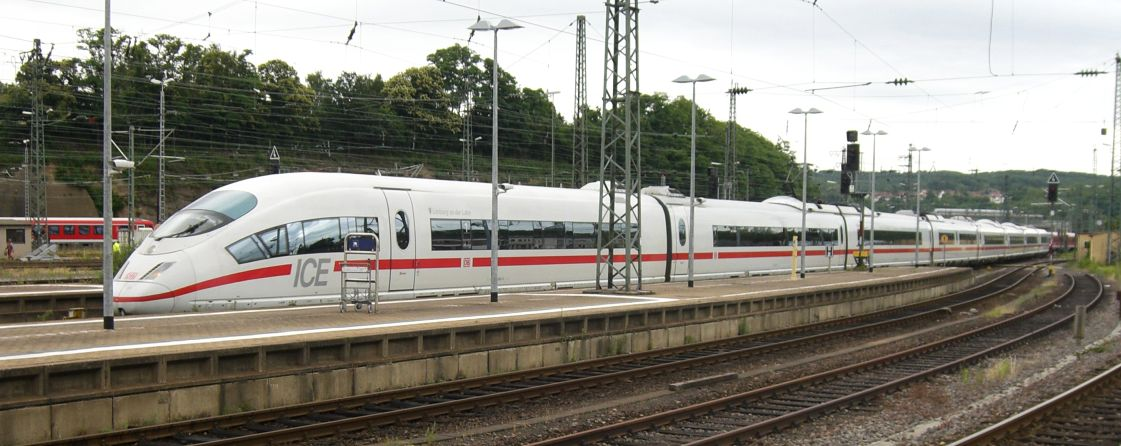
The Frankfurt-Paris ICE entering Saarbrücken Hbf in June 2008

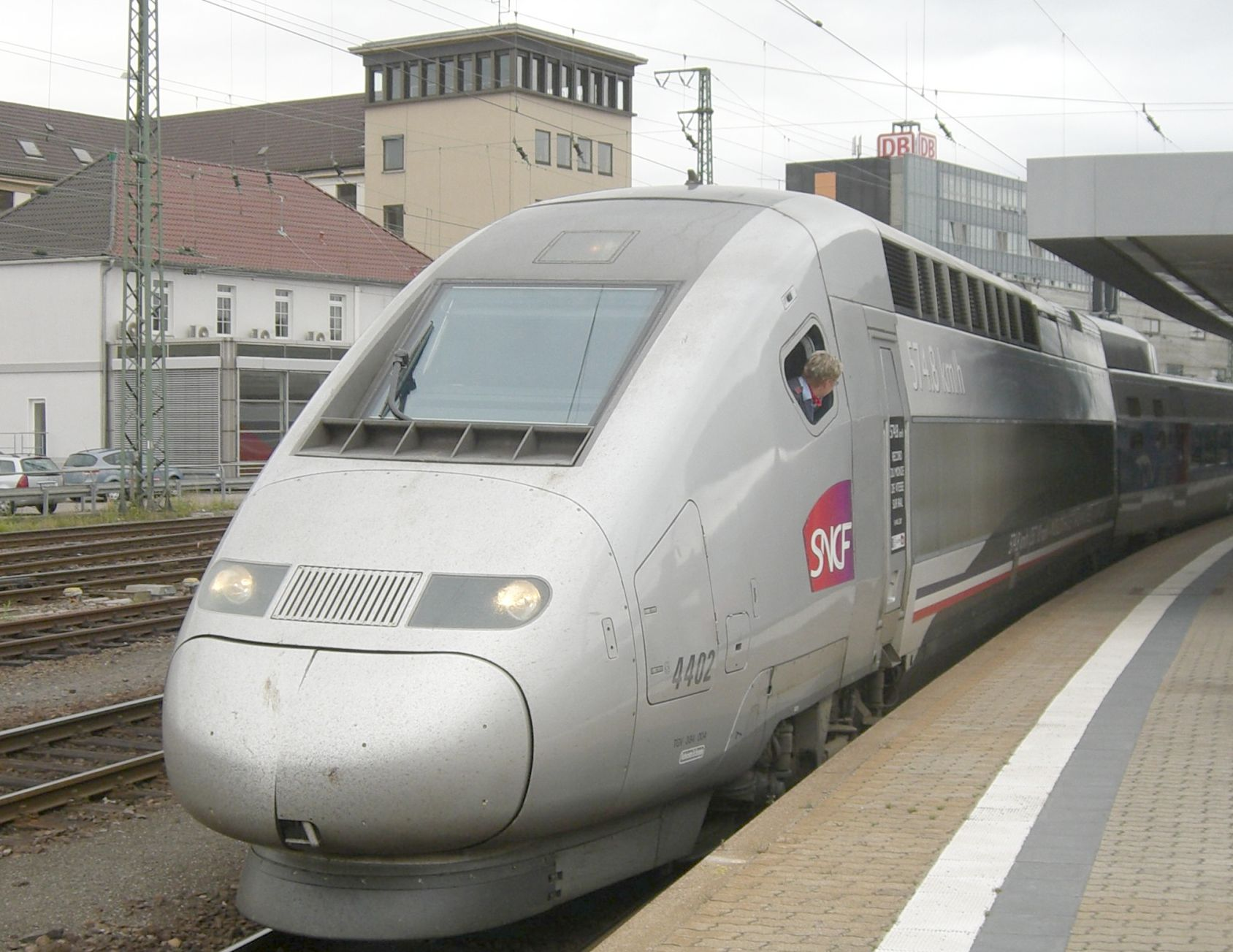
The Paris-Frankfurt TGV at Saarbrücken Hbf in June 2008

Since December 2007 Saarbrücken Hbf has been on the German high-speed railway network and an arrival and departure gateway for the cross-border ICE trains between Paris and Frankfurt. In addition, long-distance trains run to Dresden, Stuttgart and Salzburg.

Line	Route	Frequency
ICE 3	Saarbrücken – Kaiserslautern – Mannheim – Frankfurt – Berlin – Berlin Südkreuz	One train pair
ICE 15	Saarbrücken – Kaiserslautern – Mannheim – Darmstadt – Frankfurt – Erfurt – Halle – Berlin – Eberswalde – Stralsund – Binz	One train pair
ICE 60	Saarbrücken – Kaiserslautern – Mannheim – Stuttgart – Ulm – Augsburg – Munich	2 train pairs
ICE/TGV 82	Paris – Saarbrücken – Kaiserslautern – Mannheim – Frankfurt	5 train pairs

=== Local services ===
Saarbrücken Hauptbahnhof is the main hub for regional railway services in the Saarland. With few exceptions, Saarland local services begin and terminate at Saarbrücken Hbf.

Route No.	Route	Frequency
RE 1	Saarbrücken–Völklingen–Saarlouis–Merzig–Trier–Koblenz	two-hourly
RE 3	Saarbrücken-Neunkirchen–Türkismühle–Mainz	hourly
/ RE18	Saarbrücken–Forbach–Metz	hourly (with gaps)
/ RE19	Saarbrücken–Sarreguemines–Strasbourg	2 train pairs
RB 68	Saarbrücken–St. Ingbert–Zweibrücken–Pirmasens	hourly
RB 70	Merzig (Saar)–Saarlouis–Saarbrücken Hbf–St. Ingbert–Homburg (Saar) Hbf–Kaiserslautern Hbf	hourly
RB 71	Trier Hbf–Merzig (Saar)–Saarlouis Hbf – Saarbrücken Hbf–Homburg (Saar) Hbf	hourly
RB 72	Saarbrücken–Illingen–Lebach-Jabach	hourly
RB 73	Saarbrücken–Neunkirchen–St. Wendel–(Türkismühle–Neubrücke/Nahe)	half-hourly/hourly
RB 76	Saarbrücken–Wemmetsweiler–Neunkirchen–Homburg	single trains

=== Stadtbahn services ===
The Saarbahn Stadtbahn lines of the Saarbrücken transport company Saarbahn GmbH run from the four tram platforms on the station forecourt

Route No.	Route	Frequency
S1	Hauptbahnhof-Rathaus-Römerkastell-Brebach	15 min.
S1	Hauptbahnhof-Rathaus-Römerkastell-Brebach-Kleinblittersdorf	30 min.
S1	Hauptbahnhof-Rathaus-Römerkastell-Brebach-Sarreguemines	30 min.
S1	Hauptbahnhof-Rastpfuhl-Siedlerheim	15 min.
S1	Hauptbahnhof-Rastpfuhl-Siedlerheim-Riegelsberg Süd	15 min.

Trams run every 7.5 minutes on the inner city line between Brebach and Siedlerheim in both directions, every 15 minutes to Kleinblittersdorf and Riegelsberg-Süd and every 30 minutes to Sarreguemines (German: Saargemünd).

== Sources ==
- Ankunft Saarbrücken Hbf, (150 Jahre Eisenbahn an der Saar), Herausg. Staatskanzlei, Saarbrücken 2002, ISBN 3-9808556-0-0

== See also ==
- List of railway stations in the Saarland
- Rail transport in Germany
