= Eschberg =

Coordinates: 49.233806°N 7.037385°E

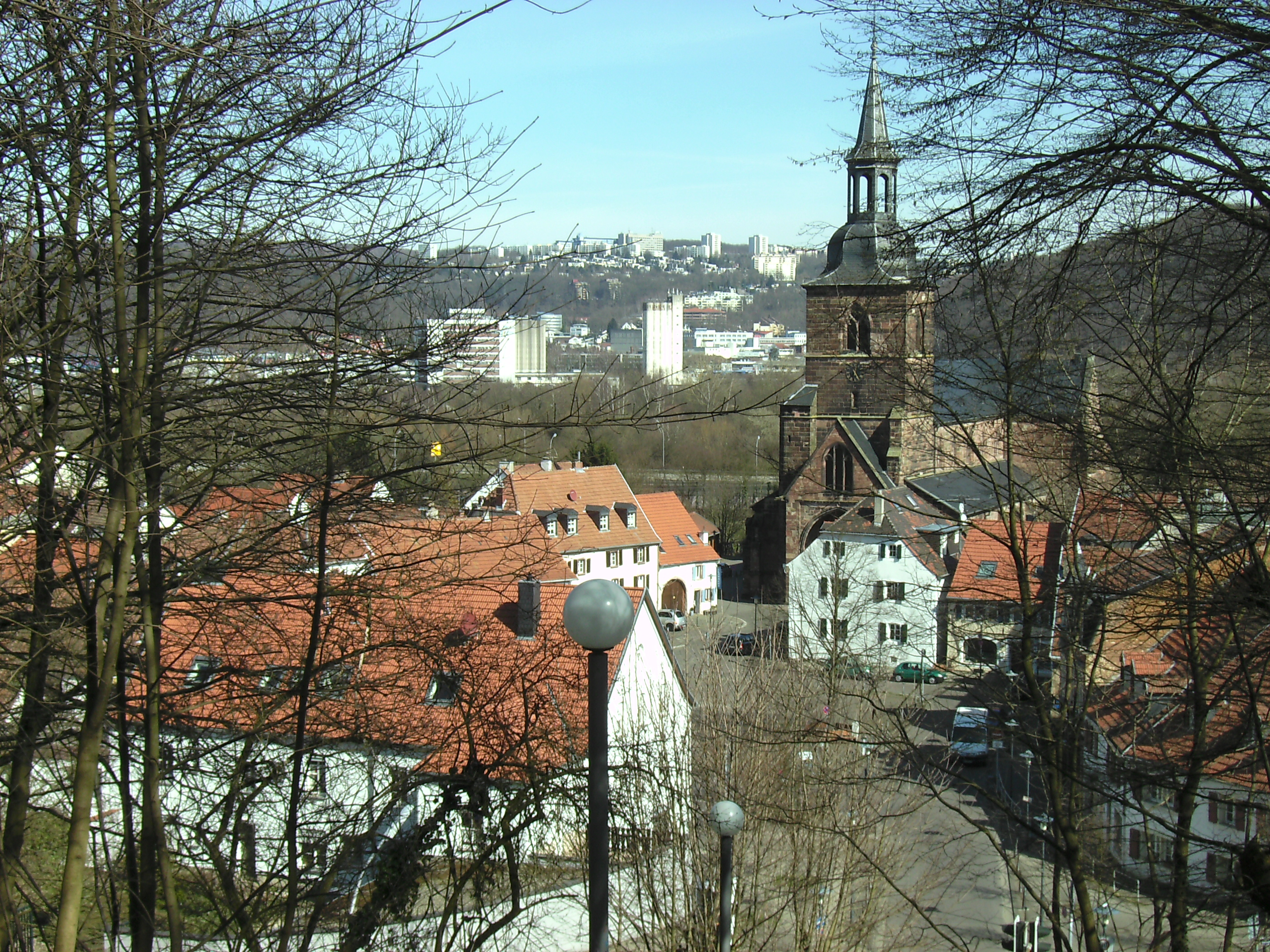

Eschberg (German pronunciation: [ˈɛʃbɛʁk]) is a part of Saarbrücken, the capital of Saarland, Germany and has a population of 7,000 residents.

== History ==
In year 1400, there was a farm owned by a man called Espergers Hensel. The city acquired the Eschberg area in 1937. It is the newest part of Saarbrücken. The first houses were built in 1953. Since 1963, Eschberg has been a residential area.

== Demographics ==
- 1965: 6,700
- 1975: 7,100
- 1985: 8,100
- 1995: 7,800
- 2005: 6,900
- 2010: 7,000
