= Ludwigshafen station =

Ludwigshafen station may refer to:

- Ludwigshafen (Rhein) Hauptbahnhof, the main station in the city of Ludwigshafen am Rhein, Rhineland-Palatinate, Germany
- Ludwigshafen (Rhein) Mitte station, a station in the centre of the city of Ludwigshafen am Rhein, Rhineland-Palatinate, Germany
- Ludwigshafen-Mundenheim station, a station in the suburb of Mundenheim, Ludwigshafen am Rhein, Rhineland-Palatinate, Germany
