= Mannheim Hauptbahnhof =

Railway station in Mannheim, Baden-Württemberg, Germany

Mannheim Hbf
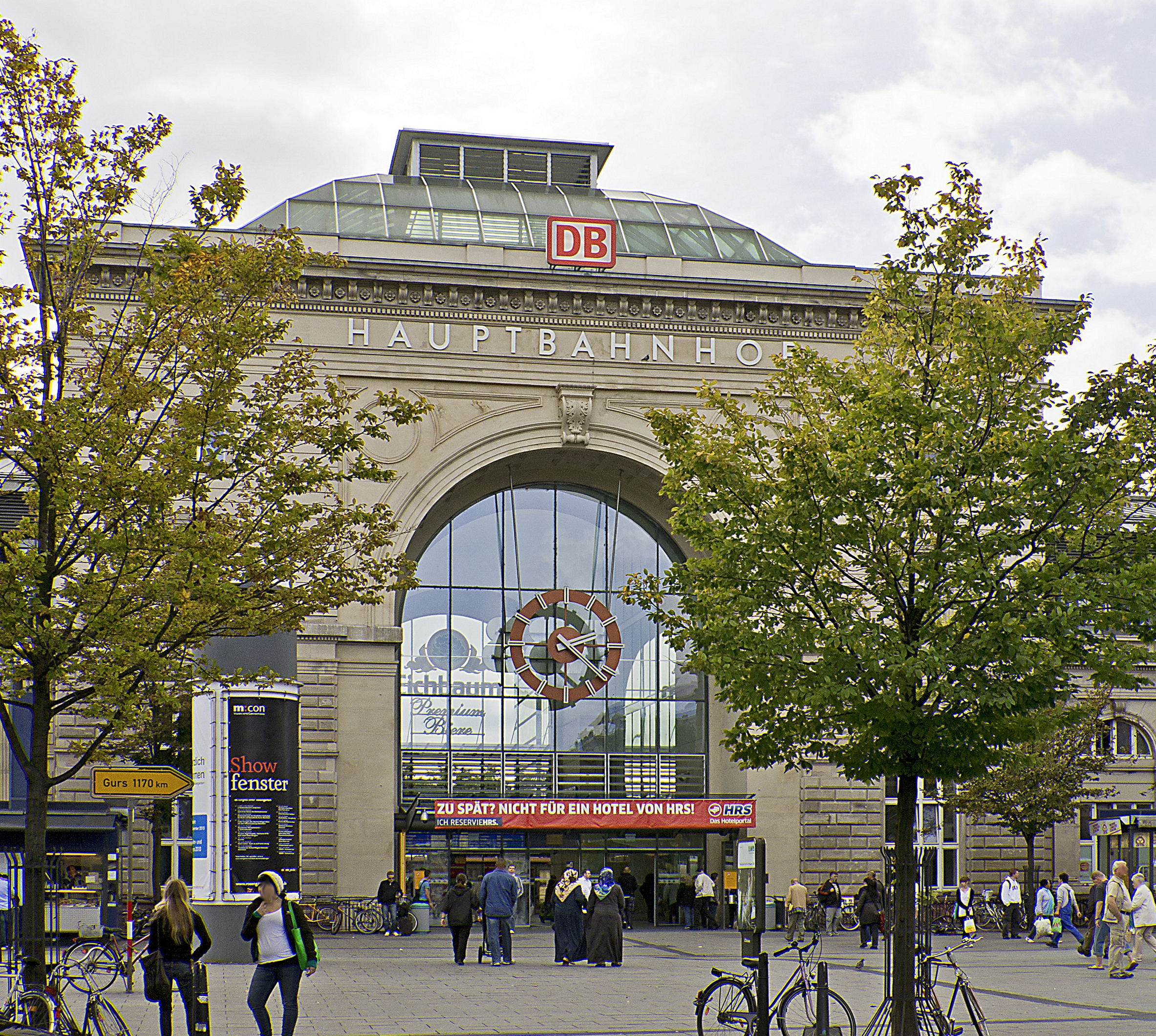

General information
- Location: Willy-Brandt-Platz 17; 68161 Mannheim; Mannheim, Baden-Württemberg; Germany
- Coordinates: 49°28′47″N 8°28′11″E
- Owner: Deutsche Bahn
- Operator: DB Netz; DB Station&Service
- Lines: Western line to Frankfurt; Mannheim-Stuttgart high-speed rail line; Rhine Valley Railway; Mannheim–Saarbrücken railway; Riedbahn; Rhine Railway
- Platforms: 11 (1–5 and 7–12)

Construction
- Accessible: Yes

Other information
- Station code: 3925
- DS100 code: RM
- Category: 2 IATA: MHJ
- Fare zone: VRN: 94
- Website: www.bahnhof.de

History
- Opened: 1840; 186 years ago

Passengers
- 100,000 daily
Services
Preceding station	DB Fernverkehr	Following station
Neustadt (Weinstraße) Hbf towards Saarbrücken Hbf	ICE 3 Sprinter	Frankfurt (Main) Hbf towards Berlin Südkreuz
Frankfurt Airport towards Berlin Gesundbrunnen	ICE 11	Heidelberg Hbf towards München Hbf
Frankfurt (Main) Hbf towards Berlin Gesundbrunnen	ICE 11	Stuttgart Hbf towards München Hbf
Worms Hbf One-way operation	ICE 11	Stuttgart Hbf towards München Hbf
Frankfurt (Main) Hbf towards Berlin Ostbahnhof	ICE 12	Karlsruhe Hbf towards Brig, Chur or Interlaken Ost
Neustadt (Weinstraße) Hbf towards Saarbrücken Hbf	ICE 15	Bensheim towards Ostseebad Binz
Neustadt (Weinstraße) Hbf towards Oldenburg Hbf	ICE 16	Darmstadt Hbf towards Berlin Südkreuz
Frankfurt (Main) Hbf One-way operation	ICE 16	Stuttgart Hbf Terminus
Reverses direction	ICE/ECE 20	Stuttgart Hbf Terminus
Reverses direction	ICE/ECE 20	Karlsruhe Hbf towards Basel SBB
Frankfurt (Main) Hbf towards Hamburg Hbf	ICE/ECE 20	Karlsruhe Hbf towards Basel SBB
Frankfurt Airport towards Hamburg Hbf or Kiel Hbf	ICE 22	Karlsruhe Hbf towards Basel SBB
Frankfurt Airport towards Hamburg Hbf or Kiel Hbf	ICE 22	Heidelberg Hbf towards Stuttgart Hbf
Frankfurt Airport towards Hamburg-Altona	ICE 42	Stuttgart Hbf towards München Hbf
Frankfurt Airport towards Hamburg-Altona or Amsterdam Centraal	ICE 43	Karlsruhe Hbf towards Basel SBB, Chur or Brig
Mainz Hbf towards Köln Hbf	ICE 45	Heidelberg Hbf towards Stuttgart Hbf or Frankfurt (Main) Hbf
Frankfurt Airport towards Dortmund Hbf	ICE 47	Stuttgart Hbf towards München Hbf
Mainz Hbf towards Dresden Hbf	IC 55	Heidelberg Hbf towards Stuttgart Hbf
Mainz Hbf towards Dortmund Hbf	IC 55 Allgäu	Heidelberg Hbf towards Oberstdorf
Neustadt (Weinstraße) Hbf towards Saarbrücken Hbf	ICE 60	Stuttgart Hbf towards München Hbf
Frankfurt Airport towards Münster Hbf	ICE 62	Vaihingen (Enz) towards Graz Hbf
Frankfurt Airport towards Dortmund Hbf	ICE 62 Bodensee	Heidelberg Hbf towards Innsbruck Hbf
Frankfurt Airport towards Amsterdam Centraal	ICE 78	Stuttgart Hbf towards München Hbf
Frankfurt (Main) Hbf Terminus	ICE/TGV 82	Kaiserslautern Hbf towards Paris Est
Frankfurt (Main) Hbf Terminus	ICE/TGV 84	Karlsruhe Hbf towards Marseille
Frankfurt (Main) Hbf Terminus	ECE 85	Karlsruhe Hbf towards Milano Centrale
Mainz Hbf One-way operation	ICE 89	Heidelberg Hbf towards St. Anton am Arlberg
Preceding station	DB Regio Mitte	Following station
Ludwigshafen (Rhein) Mitte towards Koblenz Hbf	RE 1 Südwest-Express	Terminus
Ludwigshafen (Rhein) Mitte towards Frankfurt (Main) Hbf	RE 14 Südwest-Express	Terminus
Terminus	RE 40 Freizeitexpress Murgtäler (Su only)	Heidelberg Hbf towards Freudenstadt Hbf
Terminus	RE 60	Neu-Edingen/Mannheim-Friedrichsfeld towards Frankfurt (Main) Hbf
Mannheim-Waldhof towards Frankfurt (Main) Hbf	RE 70	Terminus
Terminus	RE 73	Heidelberg Hbf towards Karlsruhe Hbf
Ludwigshafen (Rhein) Mitte towards Bingen Stadt	RB 35 Limited service	Terminus
Terminus	RB 67	Neu-Edingen/Mannheim-Friedrichsfeld towards Frankfurt (Main) Hbf
Ludwigshafen Hbf towards Fürth (Odenwald)	RB 69 Limited service	Terminus
Preceding station	(Stuttgart)	Following station
Terminus	RE 10a	Heidelberg Hbf towards Heilbronn
Terminus	RE 10b	Heidelberg Hbf towards Heilbronn
Preceding station	Rhine-Neckar S-Bahn	Following station
Ludwigshafen (Rhein) Mitte towards Homburg (Saar) Hbf	S1	Mannheim ARENA/Maimarkt towards Osterburken
Ludwigshafen (Rhein) Mitte towards Kaiserslautern Hbf	S2	Mannheim ARENA/Maimarkt towards Mosbach (Baden)
Ludwigshafen (Rhein) Mitte towards Germersheim	S3	Mannheim ARENA/Maimarkt towards Karlsruhe Hbf
Ludwigshafen (Rhein) Mitte towards Ludwigshafen (Rhein) BASF Nord	S4	Mannheim ARENA/Maimarkt towards Ludwigshafen (Rhein) Hbf
Ludwigshafen (Rhein) Mitte towards Mainz Hbf	S6	Mannheim ARENA/Maimarkt towards Bensheim
Terminus	S8	Mannheim-Käfertal towards Biblis
Mannheim-Handelshafen towards Groß‑Rohrheim	S9	Mannheim-Neckarau towards Karlsruhe Hbf
Terminus	S51	Heidelberg Hbf towards Aglasterhausen
Location

Mannheim Hauptbahnhof (German for Mannheim central station) is a railway station in Mannheim in the German state of Baden-Württemberg. It is the second largest traffic hub in southwestern Germany behind Stuttgart Hauptbahnhof, with 658 trains a day, including 238 long-distance trains. It is also a key station in the Rhine-Neckar S-Bahn. 100,000 passengers embark, disembark or transfer between trains at the station each day. The station was modernised in 2001. It is classified by Deutsche Bahn as a category 2 station.

== Layout ==
The station is located on the southern edge of central Mannheim. In November 2001, the station was comprehensively redeveloped with a modern shopping and service centre.

Travellers reach the platforms via escalators and lifts in the wings of the entrance hall, which lead to a northern and a southern subway under the tracks. The routes to the platforms have been upgraded to make them accessible for the disabled. Lifts, escalators and a direction system for the visually impaired enable all travellers to reach the trains without assistance. The lifts are to be found in the northern subway while the escalators are located in the southern subway.

There is a Deutsche Bahn lounge for first class passengers and frequent travellers.

Since 1897 the station has had a Bahnhofsmission (“station mission”, a charity established at some major German railway stations that is mainly staffed by volunteers) on platform 1, which among other things helps mobility-impaired tourists.

The station forecourt has stops for several tram and bus lines of Rhein-Neckar-Verkehr (the public transport operator of the Rhine-Neckar region), the Rhein-Haardt Bahn (RHB, an interurban running to the west), the Oberrheinische Eisenbahn (OEG, an interurban running to the east and the northeast) and the bus lines of Busverkehr Rhein-Neckar (a subsidiary of Deutsche Bahn, operating over a large region centred on Mannheim). The central bus station adjacent to the southern end of platform 1 is served by long-distance buses and an airport shuttle service, as well as non-scheduled bus services.

The entrance building continues the line of buildings on the bank of the Rhine southeast from Mannheim Palace. Its central axis faces the Kaiserring, the south-eastern inner-city ring road.

== History ==
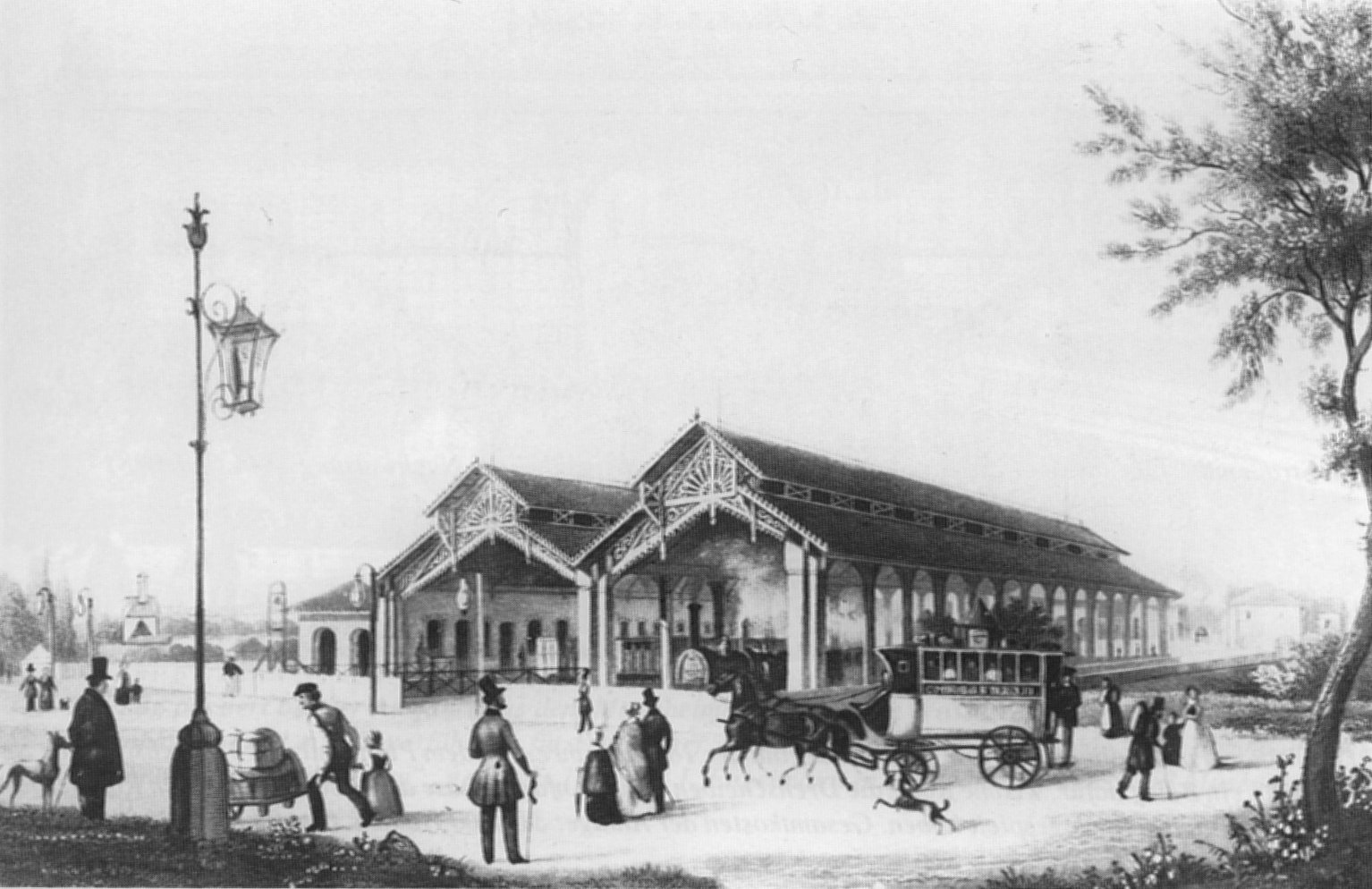
The original station, c. 1840

The original station of the Badische Hauptbahn (Baden mainline) from Heidelberg, opened in 1840, was a terminal station at the current Tattersall tram stop to the north of the current station. Plans for a bridge over the Rhine to Ludwigshafen (now the Konrad Adenauer Bridge), however, soon made it necessary to move the station.

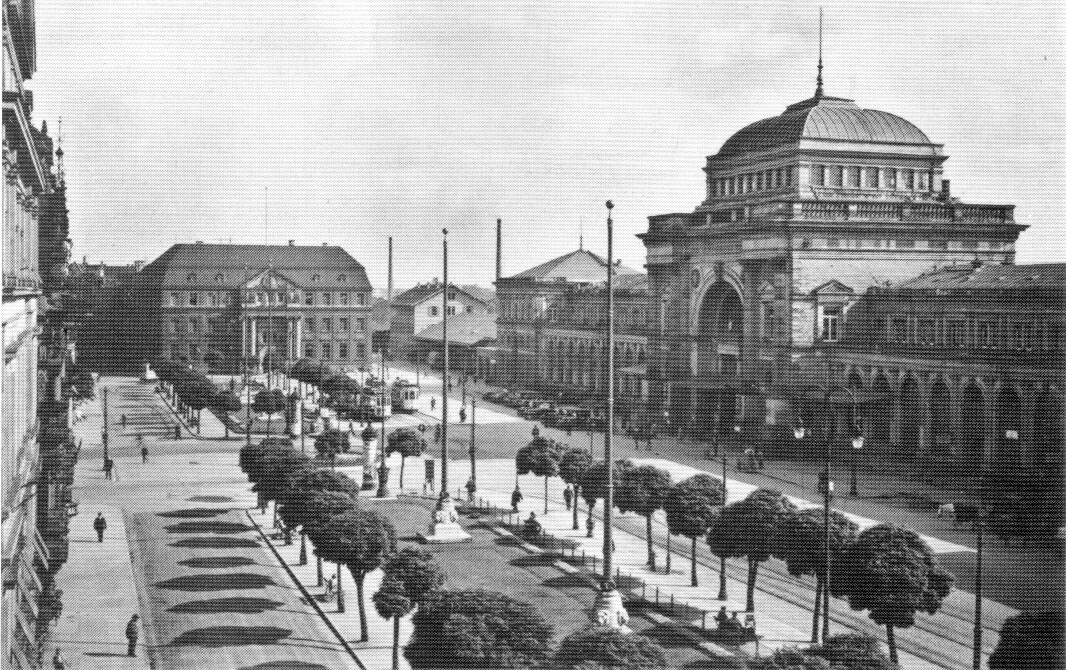
Station forecourt 1925

The station building, some of which still survives, was built between 1871 and 1876. From around 1900, consideration was given to extending or relocating the station. In 1915 it was decided to expand the existing station. In 1927, the front of the station was demolished and rebuilt 10 m (32 ft 10 in) closer to the street, doubling the area of the station. During this restructuring, there was debate on whether the facade should be restored to its original form. Ultimately, it was rebuilt in a simplified form. Due to the substantial destruction during World War II and the subsequent reconstruction of the facade it was simplified again and rebuilt without decorative elements, but reminiscent of its previous form.

In the summer 1939 timetable the station is shown as having 94 arriving and departing regular long-distance trains per day. Deutsche Reichsbahn ranked it as the 14th most congested node of its network.

Between 1977 and 1982 a new relay interlocking system (class SpDrS60) was installed, replacing the electro-mechanical interlocking at the eastern end of the station and three push button interlockings in the rest of the station area. In the mid-1980s, the new signal box controlled 74 km (46 mi) of line with 721 appliances (including 250 sets of points and derails as well as 66 main signals).

On 2 June 1985, the Western Entrance to the Riedbahn (Ried Railway) to Mannheim was opened. This avoided the need for trains running from Frankfurt via Mannheim to Stuttgart and Karlsruhe to reverse in Mannheim Hauptbahnhof.

With a total of 269 arrivals and departures of scheduled long-distance trains each day in Mannheim Hauptbahnhof in the timetable for the summer of 1989, it was the tenth most important node in the Deutsche Bundesbahn network. With 308 such arrivals and departures each day in the timetable for the summer of 1996, it had become the sixth most important node in the Deutsche Bahn network.

In 1995, a parking garage was built under the station forecourt and the station building was comprehensively renovated and redesigned between 1999 and 2001. The platform-side buildings were extended and had their symmetry restored, while the entrance hall received a glass dome. The blend of tradition and modernism is considered successful.

With 332 arrivals and departures in the 2004 timetable, the station had become the fifth most important node in the Deutsche Bahn network.

On 18 July 2007, the new central bus station was officially opened adjacent to the station. The nine parking bays used by long-distance buses operated from the bus station are currently served by more than 30 bus routes, according to the operator, Mannheimer Parkhausbetriebe GmbH.

=== Train collision in 2014 ===
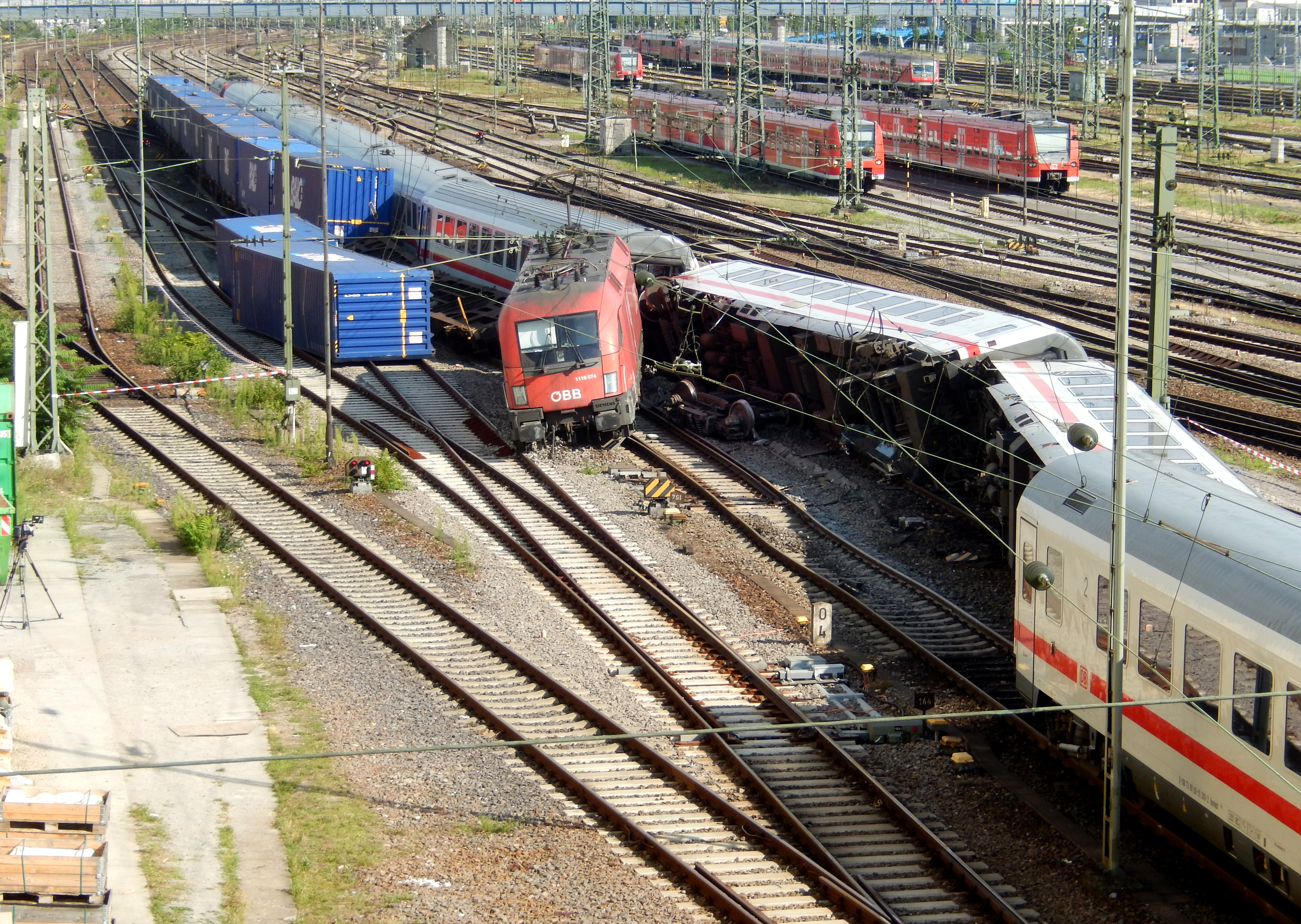
Accident site on 2 August 2014

On 1 August 2014, a freight train passing through Mannheim Hauptbahnhof crashed into the side of long-distance passenger train EuroCity 216 (from Graz to Saarbrücken) when both trains entered the station. Five cars of the EuroCity derailed, two of which overturned; two freight cars and the freight locomotive also derailed. Of the 250 passengers on the EuroCity, 34 were injured, plus four seriously (as stated in the EUB report; numbers vary among sources). Investigators determined that the freight train had failed to heed a main signal which commanded 'halt' (a red light). This happened because the driver assumed to not have reached the station yet, so he expected the signals to be on the left side, like the previous ones; but in stations, signals are placed to the right. Therefore, he took the "proceed" signal for the EuroCity as meant for him. When he passed the main signal at danger, the PZB safety system was triggered and forced the freight train to stop immediately. Instead of contacting the train controller for instructions, which is mandatory, the driver restarted the train on his own. He assumed that the PZB action was due to the missing acknowledgement of the distant signal ('expect halt') at the same location, but even then permission to continue must be asked for. He then passed two more signals ("Schutzsignale") at danger (red 'halt' aspect, not guarded by PZB) and hit the EuroCity. The accident caused a damage of 2.3 million Euros. In September 2016, the driver was convicted for intentionally endangering railway operations and for bodily injury caused by negligence, because he had continued after the forced braking without permission from the traffic controller. He received six months in prison on probation and 100 hours of community service.

== Planned developments ==
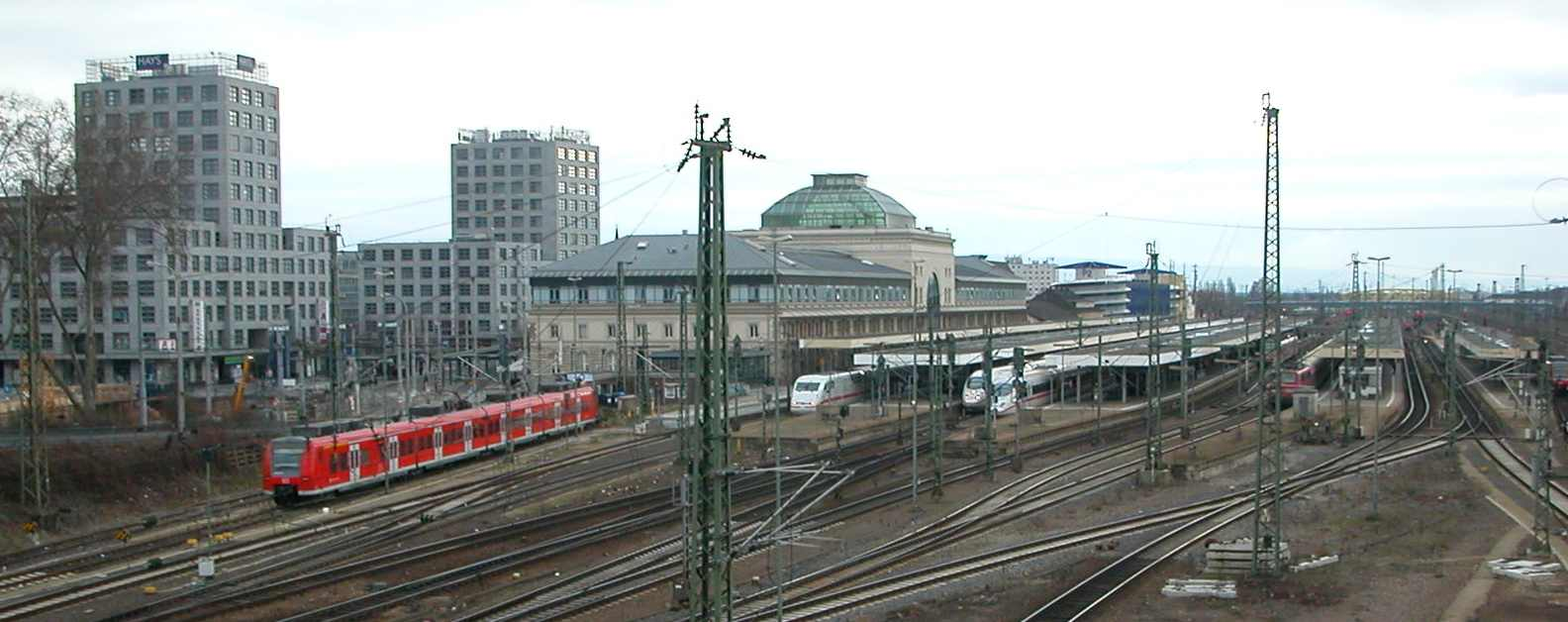
Track field

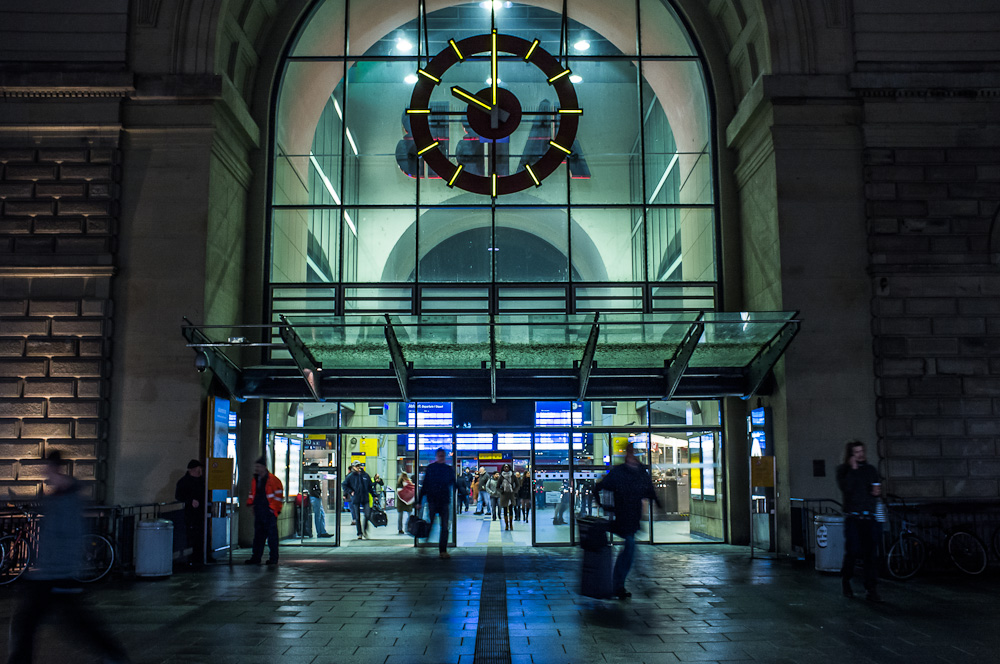
Mannheim Hauptbahnhof at night

The station lies at the junction of lines from Stuttgart, Basel, Saarbrücken and Frankfurt. The Mannheim-Stuttgart high-speed rail line was completed in 1991 and it is planned to build a high-speed line to Frankfurt. Deutsche Bahn had sought to establish a by-pass of the city through the Rheinauer Wald (forest) to the east of the city, including a complex junction in the Pfingstberg Tunnel. This would have substantially reduced the number of long-distance trains serving Mannheim, leading to massive resistance from the city and the region. As a result, Deutsche Bahn dropped this plan for the time being in 2006.

Extensive changes at the railway tracks of the main station are planned over a three-year construction period. Construction was supposed to have started in late 2007, but had not begun by early 2010. Among other things, a new platform is to be built for the Rhine-Neckar S-Bahn for approximately €50 million. In addition, regional and long-distance traffic are to be largely segregated, with regional trains being operated in the future on the four tracks closest to the station building and long-distance traffic operating on the more distant tracks.

As part of an urban development project called Mannheim 21 on land on the south side of the station, there are plans to convert the most southerly underpass under the platforms, now used as a baggage tunnel, into a third platform access route and extend it to the Lindenhof; it would not connect to the station building, but would instead connect to the bus station. The current southern underpass, which runs under the middle of the platforms, is frequently overloaded by pedestrian traffic.

Due to the increasing number of passengers using the station forecourt at the interchanges to public transport (currently around 52,000 daily) an upgrade of the Hauptbahnhof tram/light rail stop is proposed. Two versions are discussed: option 1, which includes four new platforms laid across the axis of the whole Kaiserring, is preferred by the city council. Option 2 would add one track and one platform to the existing stop. Rhein-Neckar-Verkehr (Rhine-Neckar Transport) favours option 2 because it would be more practicable, being less expensive and faster to build.

== Operational usage ==
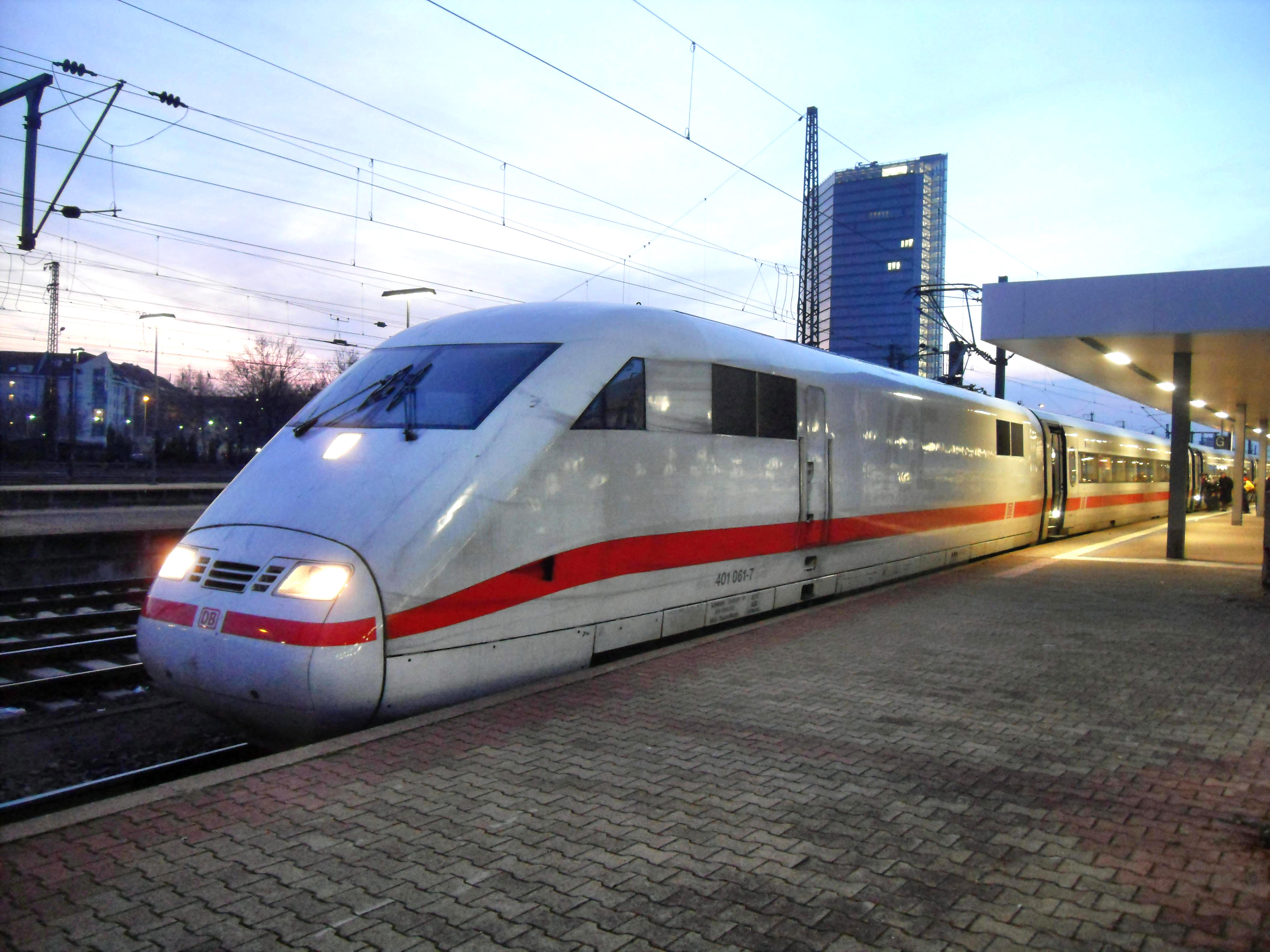
ICE 1 in Mannheim Hauptbahnhof

Each day DB operates 238 long-distance trains, 265 regional trains and 155 S-Bahn trains through the station (as of 2009).

=== Long distance trains ===
Due to its convenient position, many long-distance lines connect in Mannheim, with overlapping routes creating services at 60-minute or smaller intervals on several routes. Various high-speed routes bring major cities in Germany and in neighboring countries within a few hours away. In the 2026 timetable, the following long-distance services stop at the station:

Line	Route	Frequency
ICE 3	Saarbrücken – Kaiserslautern – Mannheim – Frankfurt – Berlin – Berlin Südkreuz	One train pair
ICE 11	Berlin Gesundbrunnen – Berlin – Leipzig – Erfurt – Frankfurt – Mannheim – Stuttgart – Ulm – Augsburg – Munich	Every two hours
ICE 12	Berlin Ostbahnhof – Berlin – Braunschweig – Kassel-Wilhelmshöhe – Frankfurt – Mannheim – Karlsruhe – Freiburg – Basel – Switzerland	Every two hours
ICE 15	Saarbrücken – Kaiserslautern – Mannheim – Darmstadt – Frankfurt – Erfurt – Halle – Berlin – Eberswalde – Stralsund – Binz	One train pair
ICE/ECE 20	Hamburg – Hanover – Kassel-Wilhelmshöhe – Frankfurt (Main) – Mannheim – Karlsruhe – Freiburg – Basel	2 hour intervals
ICE 22	(Kiel –) Hamburg – Hanover – Kassel-Wilhelmshöhe – Frankfurt (Main) – Frankfurt Airport – Mannheim – Stuttgart	2 hour intervals
ICE 42	(Hamburg – Bremen –) Dortmund – Essen – Duisburg – Cologne – Siegburg/Bonn – Frankfurt Airport – Mannheim – Stuttgart – Ulm – Augsburg – München	2 hour intervals
ICE 43	(Amsterdam – Duisburg –) or (Hamburg – Bremen – Münster – Dortmund – Essen – Duisburg – Düsseldorf –) or (Hanover – Dortmund – Wuppertal –) Cologne – Siegburg/Bonn – Frankfurt Airport – Mannheim – Karlsruhe – Freiburg – Basel	2 hour intervals
ICE 45	Cologne – Cologne/Bonn Airport – Montabaur – Limburg Süd – Wiesbaden – Mainz – Mannheim – Heidelberg – Stuttgart	Individual services
ICE 47	Dortmund – Duisburg – Köln Messe/Deutz – Frankfurt Airport – Mannheim – Stuttgart	2 hour intervals
IC 55; ICE 55	Dresden – Leipzig – Halle – Magdeburg – Braunschweig – Hanover – Bielefeld – Dortmund – Hagen – Wuppertal – Solingen – Cologne – Bonn – Koblenz – Mainz – Mannheim – Heidelberg – Vaihingen – Stuttgart (– Reutlingen – Tübingen)	Every 2 hours
IC 55; ICE 55	Dortmund – Essen – Düsseldorf – Cologne – Bonn – Koblenz – Mainz – Mannheim – Heidelberg – Vaihingen – Stuttgart – Ulm – Oberstdorf	1 train pair
ICE 60	Saarbrücken – Kaiserslautern – Neustadt – Mannheim – Stuttgart – Ulm – Augsburg – Munich	2 train pairs
ICE 62	Münster – Wanne-Eickel – Duisburg – Düsseldorf – Köln Messe/Deutz – Frankfurt Airport – Mannheim – Stuttgart – Ulm – Augsburg – Munich – Salzburg – Villach – Klagenfurt – Graz	1 train pair
ICE 62	Dortmund – Bochum – Essen – Duisburg – Düsseldorf – Köln Messe/Deutz – Frankfurt Airport – Mannheim – Heidelberg – Stuttgart – Ulm – Friedrichshafen Stadt – Lindau-Reutin – Bregenz – St. Anton – Innsbruck	1 train pair
ICE/TGV 82	Frankfurt (Main) – Mannheim – Kaiserslautern – Saarbrücken – Paris Est	2 hour intervals
ICE/TGV 84	Marseille - Aix TGV - Avignon TGV - Lyon-Part-Dieu - Mâcon-Ville - Besançon Franche-Comté - Belfort-Montbéliard - Mulhouse - Strasbourg - Baden-Baden - Karlsruhe - Mannheim - Frankfurt	1 train pair
ECE 85	Frankfurt – Mannheim – Karlsruhe – Freiburg – Basel – Lucerne – Bellinzona – Monza – Milan	1 train pair
EN	Zürich – Basel – Freiburg (Breisgau) – Karlsruhe – Mannheim – Frankfurt Süd – Halle – Berlin – Hamburg	1 train pair

=== Regional services ===
In the 2026 timetable, the following regional services stop at the station:

Line	Route	Interval
RE 1	Mannheim – Ludwigshafen Mitte – Neustadt – Kaiserslautern – Homburg – Saarbrücken – Trier – Koblenz	2 hours
RE 9	Mannheim – Schwetzingen – Hockenheim – Waghäusel – Graben-Neudorf – Karlsruhe	Some trains in the peak
RE 10a	Mannheim – Heidelberg – Eberbach – Mosbach-Neckarelz – Bad Friedrichshall – Heilbronn	2 hours
RE 10b	Mannheim – Heidelberg – Sinsheim – Bad Friedrichshall – Heilbronn	2 hours
RE 14	Mannheim – Ludwigshafen Mitte – Worms – Mainz	2 hours
RE 40	Mannheim – Heidelberg – Wiesloch-Walldorf – Bruchsal – Karlsruhe – Freudenstadt	1 train pair
RE 60	Mannheim – Weinheim – Bensheim – Darmstadt – Frankfurt	2 hours
RB 67	Mannheim – Neu-Edingen/Friedrichsfeld – Weinheim – Bensheim – Darmstadt – Frankfurt	Some trains
RE 70	Mannheim – Biblis – Gernsheim – Frankfurt	1 hour
RE 73	Mannheim – Heidelberg – Wiesloch-Walldorf – Bruchsal – Karlsruhe	Some trains

=== Rhine-Neckar S-Bahn ===
The Rhine-Neckar S-Bahn is the backbone of transport in the Rhine-Neckar region. In December 2003, a 290 km (180 mi) S-Bahn network was put into operation. Further expansion of the S-Bahn network has been agreed on in 2008, but after several delays, the new lines are expected to start in 2020. In the 2026 timetable, the following S-Bahn services stop at the station:

Line	Route	Frequency
S1	Homburg (Saar)–Osterburken; Homburg – Kaiserslautern – Neustadt (Weinstraße) – Schifferstadt – Ludwigshafen – Mannheim – Heidelberg – Neckargemünd – Eberbach – Mosbach – Osterburken	60 minute intervals
S2	Kaiserslautern–Eberbach (–Mosbach Baden); Kaiserslautern – Neustadt (Weinstraße) – Schifferstadt – Ludwigshafen – Mannheim – Heidelberg – Neckargemünd – Eberbach (– Mosbach Baden)	60 minute intervals
S3	Germersheim–Karlsruhe; Germersheim – Speyer – Schifferstadt – Ludwigshafen – Mannheim – Heidelberg – Wiesloch-Walldorf – Bruchsal – Karlsruhe	60 minute intervals
S4	Germersheim–Bruchsal; Germersheim – Speyer – Schifferstadt – Ludwigshafen – Mannheim – Heidelberg – Wiesloch-Walldorf – Bruchsal	60 minute intervals
S6	(Bensheim –) Mannheim – Ludwigshafen – Frankenthal – Worms – Mainz	30 minute intervals (60 minutes from/to Bensheim)
S9	Karlsruhe – Blankenloch – Graben-Neudorf – Waghäusel – Hockenheim – Schwetzingen – Mhm-Rheinau – Mannheim Hbf – Mhm-Neckarstadt or Mhm-Neuostheim – Mhm-Waldhof – Ladenburg – Bürstadt – Biblis – Groß-Rohrheim	60 minute intervals 30 minutes (Karlsruhe–Graben in peak); 30 min (Graben–Mannheim)
S39	Mannheim-Waldhof – Mannheim (– Heidelberg – Karlsruhe)	Individual services

=== Interurban trams ===
In the station forecourt is the stop of the metre gauge trams of the Rhein-Neckar-Verkehr (RNV), served by line 4 of the Rhein-Haardtbahn (RHB) and line 5 of the Oberrheinische Eisenbahn (OEG) two interurban tramways, running over the tracks of Mannheim's tram company (the MVV Verkehr AG) within the city limits.

Line	Route	Frequency
4	Heddesheim/Käfertal – Mannheim – Oggersheim/Bad Dürkheim (RHB)	10-minute intervals
5	Weinheim – Mannheim – Heidelberg – Weinheim (OEG)	10-minute intervals

== Gallery ==
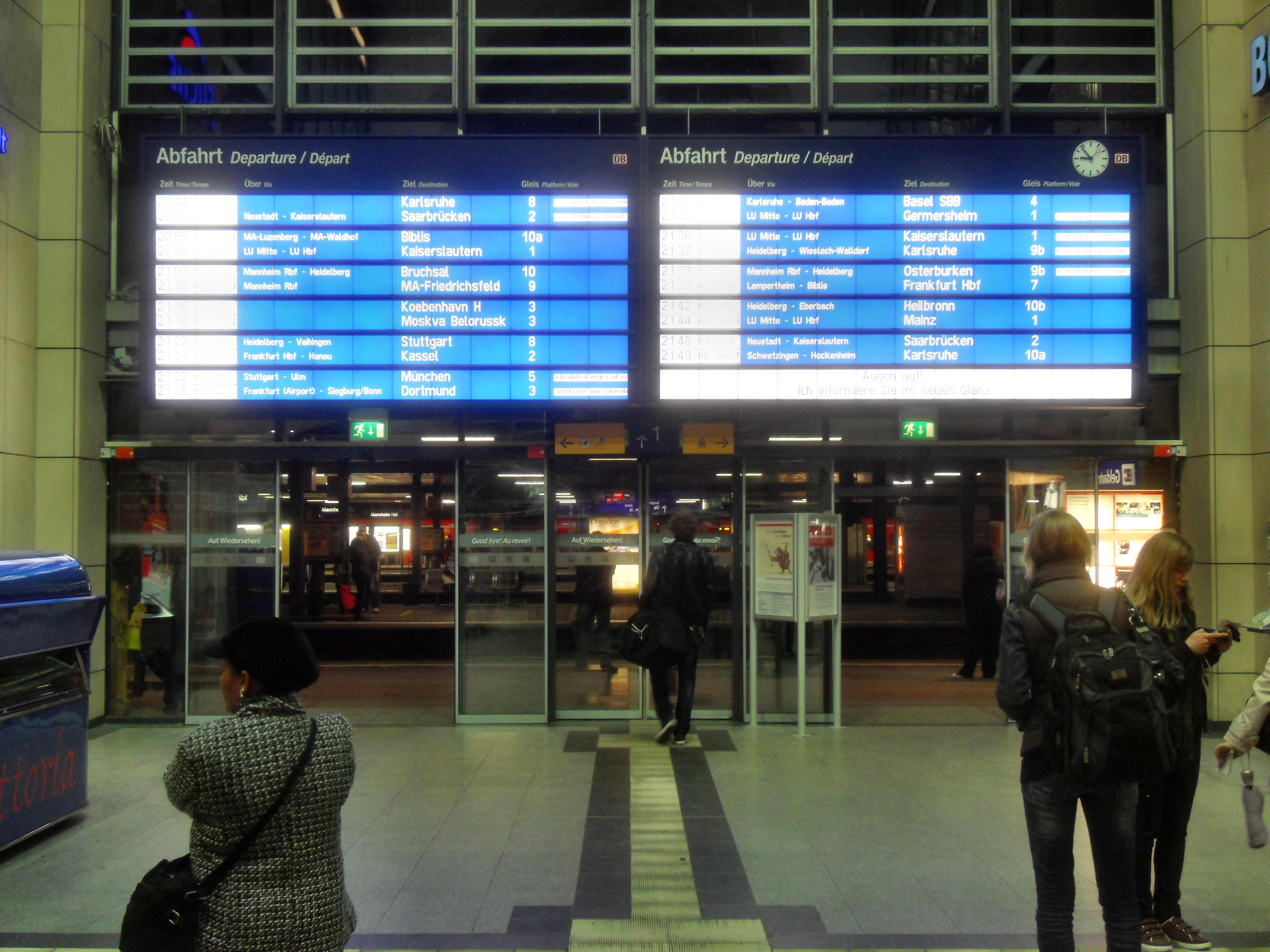
The digital display in the lobby

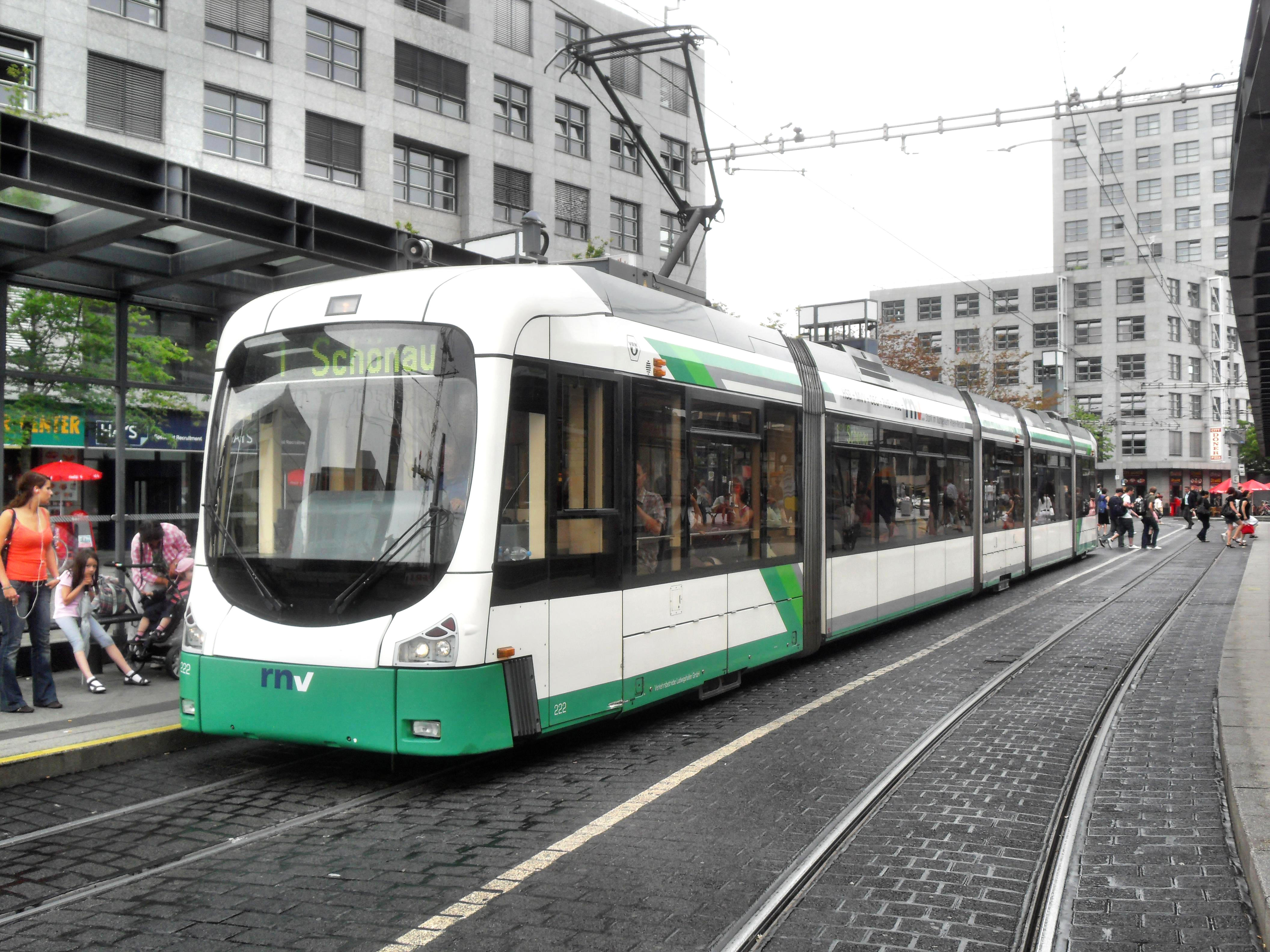
Variotram at the station forecourt of Mannheim Hauptbahnhof

== See also ==
- Rail transport in Germany
