= Ludwigshafen (Rhein) Hauptbahnhof =

Railway station in Germany

Ludwigshafen (Rhein) Hbf
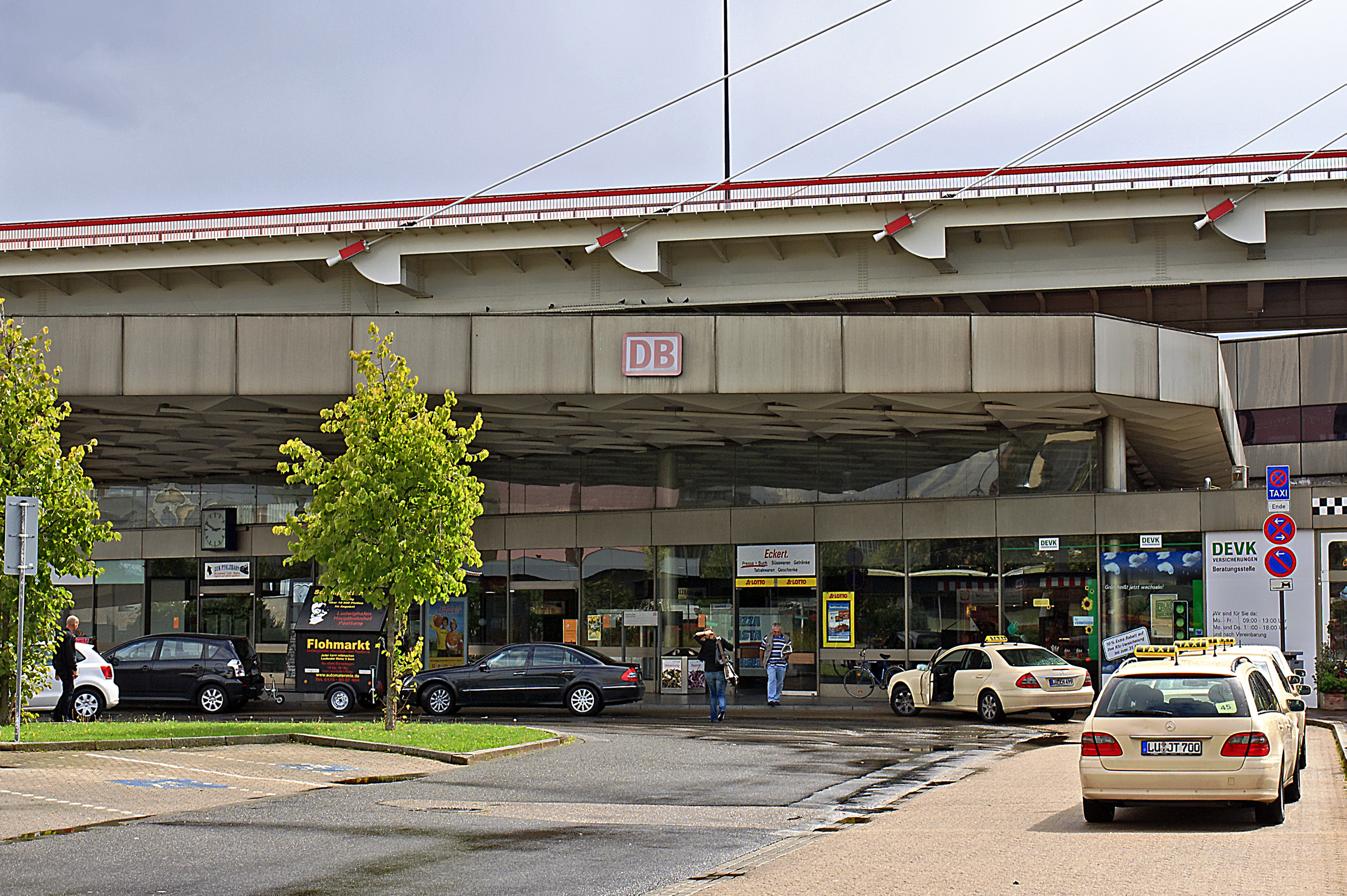
- Station entrance hall

General information
- Location: Pasadenaallee 1, Ludwigshafen, Rhineland-Palatinate; Germany
- Coordinates: 49°28′40″N 8°26′3″E
- Owner: DB Netz
- Operator: DB Station&Service
- Lines: Mainz–Ludwigshafen (KBS 660); Rhine-Haardt Railway (KBS 668); Mannheim–Saarbrücken (KBS 670); Connecting line to BASF works line
- Platforms: 10

Construction
- Accessible: Yes

Other information
- Station code: 3837
- DS100 code: RL
- IBNR: 8000236
- Category: 2
- Fare zone: VRN: 94
- Website: www.bahnhof.de

Services
Preceding station	DB Regio Mitte	Following station
Neustadt (Weinstraße) Hbf towards Koblenz Hbf	RE 1 selected trains only	Ludwigshafen (Rhein) Mitte towards Heidelberg Hbf
Frankenthal Hbf towards Frankfurt (Main) Hbf	RE 4	Schifferstadt towards Karlsruhe Hbf
Terminus	RE 7 Sundays only	Ludwigshafen (Rhein) Mitte towards Freudenstadt Hbf
Frankenthal Hbf towards Frankfurt (Main) Hbf	RE 14 selected trains only	Ludwigshafen (Rhein) Mitte towards Mannheim Hbf
Preceding station	Rhine-Neckar S-Bahn	Following station
Ludwigshafen-Mundenheim towards Homburg (Saar) Hbf	S1	Ludwigshafen (Rhein) Mitte towards Osterburken
Ludwigshafen-Mundenheim towards Kaiserslautern Hbf	S2	Ludwigshafen (Rhein) Mitte towards Mosbach (Baden)
Ludwigshafen-Mundenheim towards Germersheim	S3	Ludwigshafen (Rhein) Mitte towards Karlsruhe Hbf
Ludwigshafen-Mundenheim towards Ludwigshafen (Rhein) BASF Nord	S4	Ludwigshafen (Rhein) Mitte towards Ludwigshafen (Rhein) Hbf
Ludwigshafen-Oggersheim towards Mainz Hbf	S6	Ludwigshafen (Rhein) Mitte towards Bensheim
Location

Ludwigshafen (Rhein) Hauptbahnhof is a railway station at Ludwigshafen am Rhein in the German state of Rhineland-Palatinate. A combination of a wedge-shaped station and a two-level interchange, the station is at the junction on the lines from Mainz and Neustadt an der Weinstrasse to Mannheim. It is classified by Deutsche Bahn as a category 2 station. The Ludwigshafen station was built in 1847 as a terminal station in the centre of modern Ludwigshafen. The current station was built in 1969 to the west of the city centre, but has not proved to be a success due to its poor location

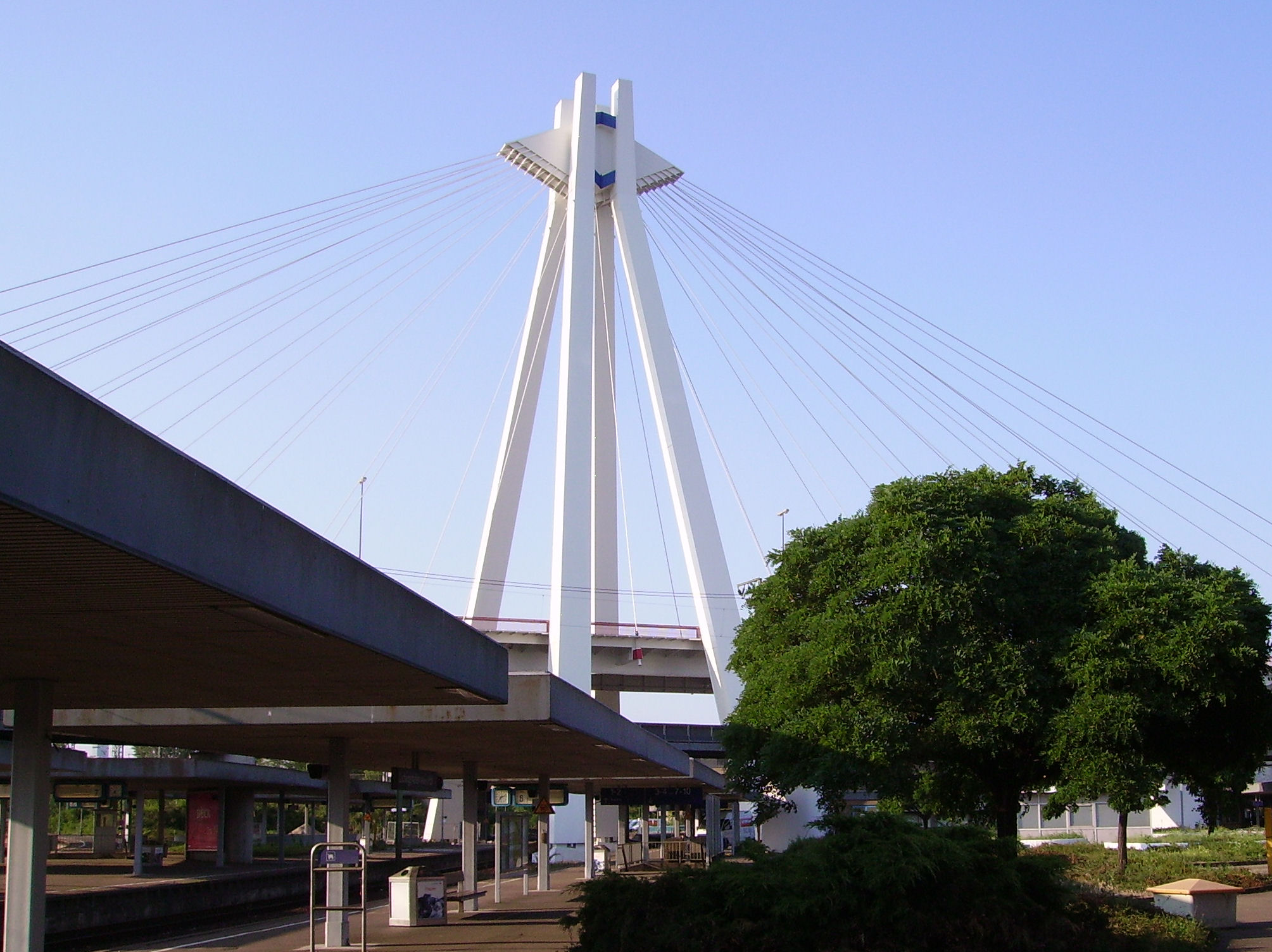
Pylons of the cable-stayed bridge seen from the platforms.

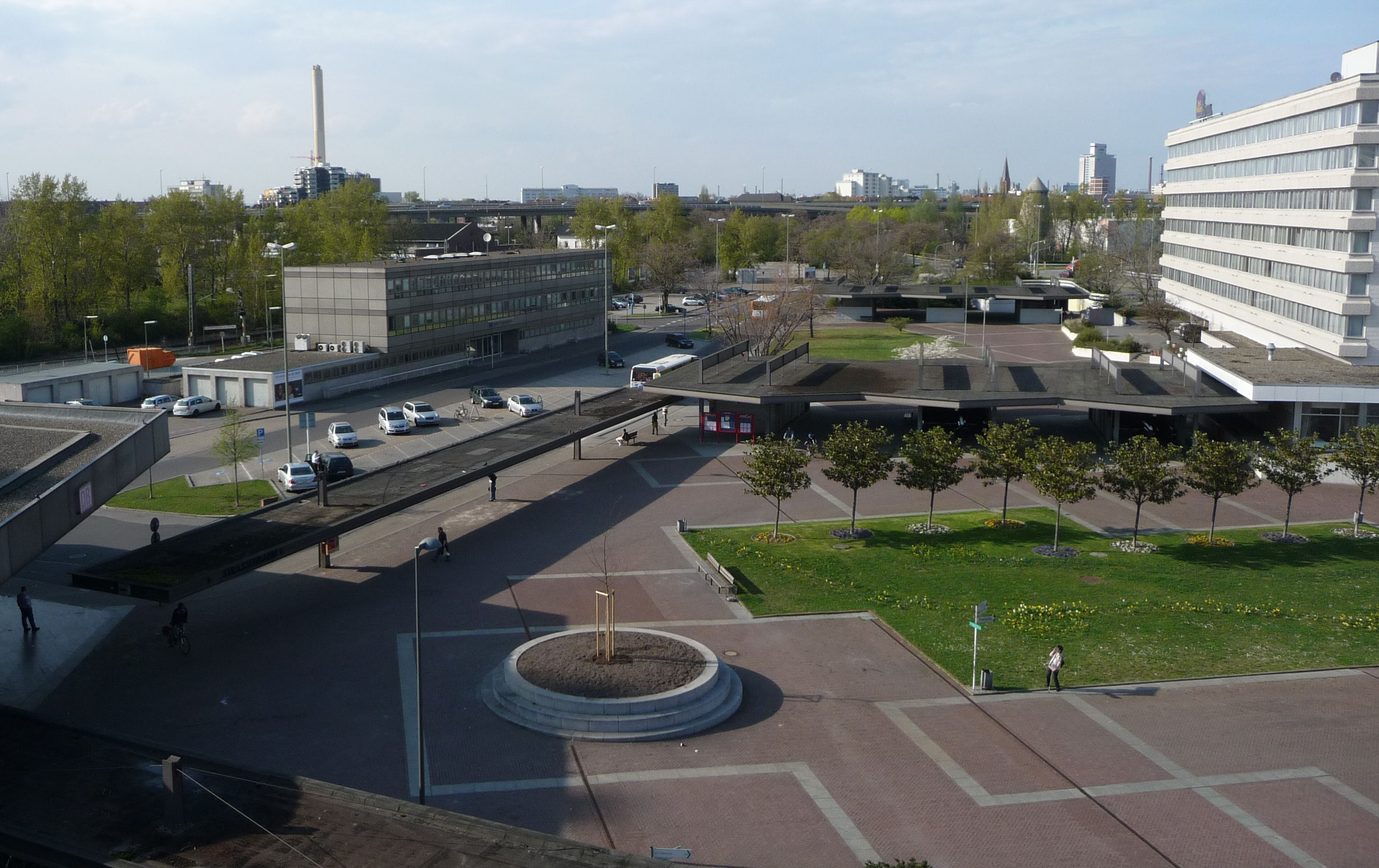
The station forecourt in April 2009. The sheltered way leads to the underground tram station.

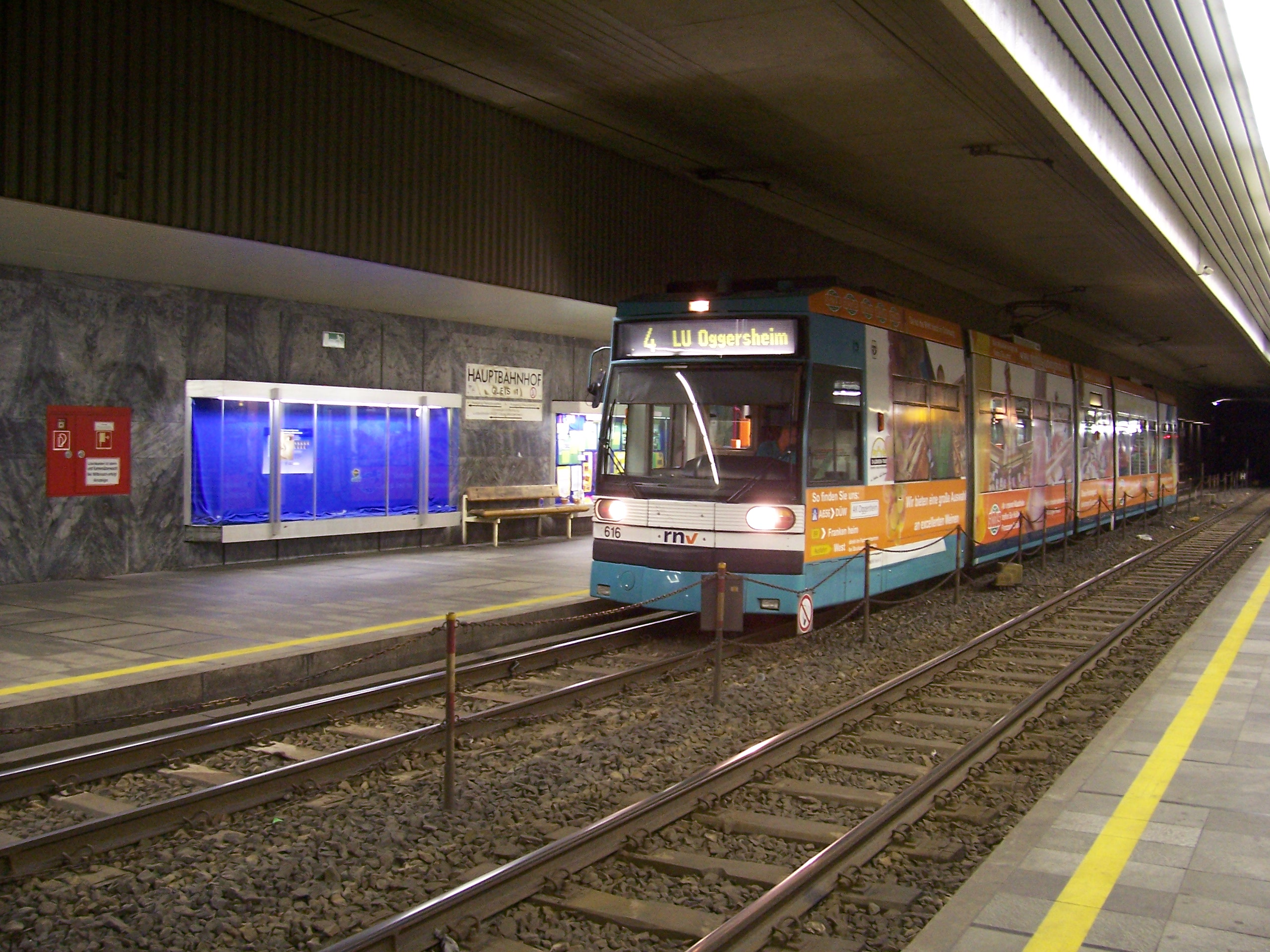
Underground tram station.

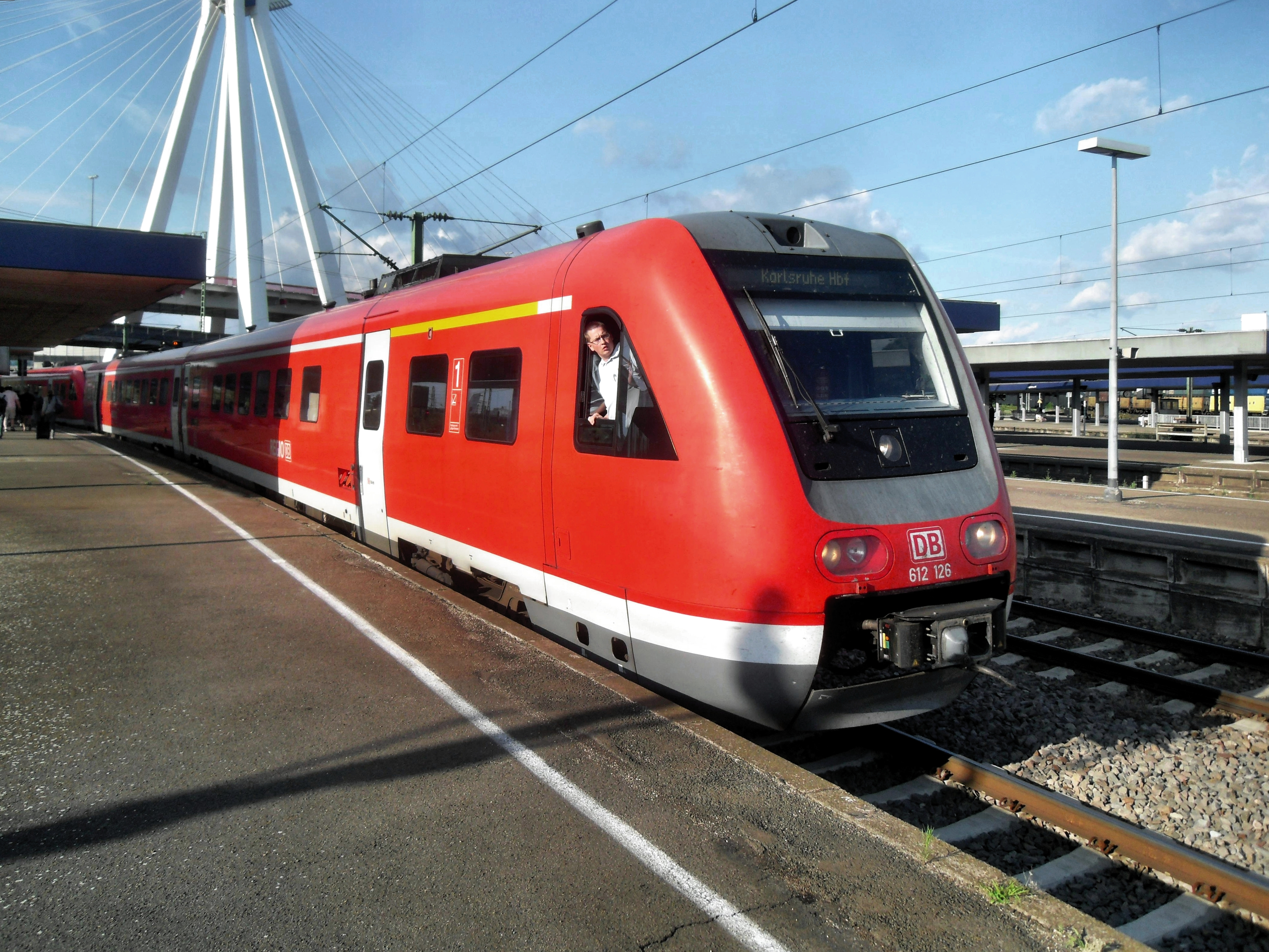
Regional-Express made up of class 612 in Ludwigshafener Hauptbahnhof on the way to Karlsruhe.

== History ==
=== Terminus 1847–1969 ===
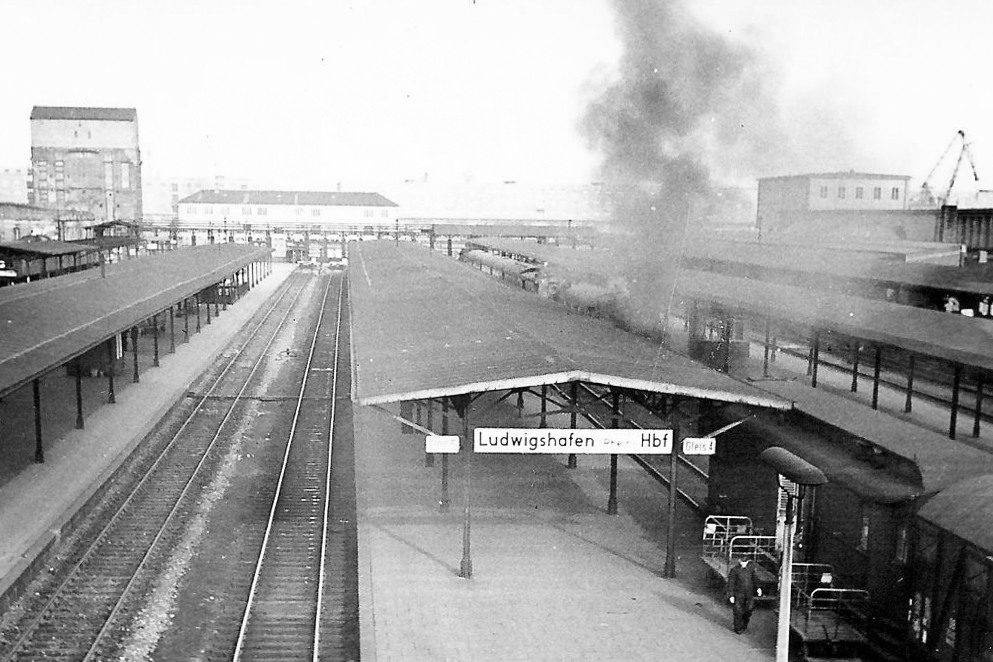
Platforms of the old terminus in February 1958

The first station in Ludwigshafen was a terminus in Rheinschanze, now central Ludwigshafen, opened on 11 June 1847 on the Palatine Ludwig Railway to the coal pits of Bexbach, now Saarland. The station was located immediately next to the port of Winterhafen, which opened in 1845, so a direct access to the Rhine was possible. The station building was a two-storey building with a clock tower and single-storey wings on its south side. The original station building was rebuilt with three-story wings on both sides in order to cope with the opening of the line to Worms on 15 June 1853 and the bridge over the Rhine to Mannheim on 25 February 1867.

The early connection of Ludwigshafen to the rail network significantly promoted the rapid development of Ludwigshafen, but it also caused significant urban problems, as the station separated the neighbourhoods now called Nord and Mitte. A viaduct was opened carrying Ludwigsstraße over the railway in 1890. It later carried the tram tracks to Friesenheim and further on to Oppau. Until the late 1960s this bridge was the only North-South-trunk road in Ludwigshafen, so it became with the increase of car traffic a bottleneck. The bridge was in service for tram traffic until January 1974.

At the end of the 19th century the passenger station was extended. A marshalling yard was also built on the line to Neustadt, with connecting curves to the lines to Mannheim and Worms. During World War II, the railway facilities in Ludwigshafen were partially destroyed. The station was rebuilt in a simplified form in 1954.

There were various proposals to replace the terminal station with a through station. One of these was prevented from going forward by World War II and another was rejected by the Federal Government in the early 1950s because it failed to maintain connections with the BASF factory. In May 1959, a direct connection curve between the lines from Mainz and Mannheim was opened for long-distance fast passenger trains and freight trains at a cost of 16 million Deutsche Marks. Previously all trains on this route had to reverse either in the terminus or the freight yard.

=== Transformation 1962–1971 ===
In the late 1950s it was decided to build a new station at its current location as part of a comprehensive transport plan for Mannheim and Ludwigshafen. The new passenger station was built with a triangular shape on two levels. On the upper level there are two platform tracks and two through tracks without platforms on the Mannheim–Worms–Mainz line, which was a development of the connection opened in 1959. The lower level triangular station has eight platform tracks on a widely spaced site. The western platforms serve the tracks between Mannheim and Neustadt; the eastern platforms serve the tracks between Neustadt and Mainz and the commuter trains from the Palatinate to the BASF factory. A cable-stayed bridge was also built above the station for Federal Highway B 37 and a tram tunnel and a tunnel for pedestrians and cyclists was built under it.

The station building is partly built below the high-level platforms. The station forecourt is divided into three parts. Taxi stands and a parking area are located in the western part. The bus station is to the east under the main street. In the middle a four-track tunnel of the tram station was built under a pedestrian area; this is also used by the trains of the Rhine-Haardt Railway (Rhein-Haardtbahn). Under the 1962 agreement concluded with Ludwigshafen, the city had committed to the new central station connected to the road and tram networks, so that it was easily reached from all parts of the city. The underground tram station was built in anticipation of the planned removal of trams from all the inner city streets.

An essential prerequisite for the transformation of the Ludwigshafen railway facilities was the removal of the freight and marshalling yards, which were moved to Mannheim.

=== New station in 1969 ===
The new station was opened in May 1969 station and was described as one of Deutsche Bundesbahn‘s most interesting and attractive buildings. It was said that the removal of the terminal station would provide Ludwigshafen with urban development opportunities that the devastation of the war had not.

The new timetables after the relocation of the station was not much changed: long-distance and Trans Europ Express continued to run to Mannheim without stopping in Ludwigshafen.

The railway land around the old terminus was cleared and a second highway was built to Mannheim, with Federal Highway B 44 running from the northern end of the new station to Kurt Schumacher Bridge over the Rhine to Mannheim. In September 1976, trams began running through the new underground tramway. In 1979 the Rathaus-Center opened on the site of the former terminus; this is a high-rise building consisting of a shopping centre and the city hall. The western part of the former railway land was still largely derelict land in 2008.

In the timetable of the summer of 2000, 16 InterRegio trains stopped calling in Ludwigshafen. In 2002, the Ludwigshafen-based urban planner Lars Piske described the station as sinking into uselessness and suggested that it had led to the loss of sales from Ludwigshafen to Mannheim.

In December 2003, the Rhine-Neckar S-Bahn commenced operations. A workshop was built in the station for the maintenance of the S-Bahn trains at a cost of €16 million. The line across the bridge over the Rhine to Mannheim was widened to four tracks, and the new station of Ludwigshafen (Rhein) Mitte was built on it closer to the centre of Ludwigshafen. As early as 1973 the Deutsche Bundesbahn had presented this concept as a cheaper way of improving the city’s transport links. Some Regional-Express trains that now stop at Ludwigshafen-Mitte do not stop at Ludwigshafen Hauptbahnhof.

In December 2008, Rhine-Neckar Transport (Rhein-Neckar-Verkehr) closed two of the four tram tracks leading to the station, including the lines running through the tram tunnel. In the end this had only been used in peak hours, by about 1,000 passengers each day.

== Operations ==
In the 2017 timetable, the daily EC 217 service to Graz is the only long-distance service at the station. In addition, the station is a stop for S-Bahn lines S1 to S4 and various regional routes.

=== Long distance ===
Type	Route	Frequency
EC/RJ 62	Saarbrücken – Kaiserslautern – Ludwigshafen – Mannheim – Stuttgart – Ulm – Augsburg – Munich – Salzburg – Bischofshofen – Selzthal – Schladming – Graz	1 train pair daily

=== Regional and suburban transport ===
Line	Route	KBS	Operator	Interval
S1	Homburg (Saar) – Kaiserslautern – Neustadt (Weinst) – Schifferstadt – Ludwigshafen – Mannheim – Heidelberg – Eberbach – Mosbach – Osterburken	665.1-2	DB Regio Südwest	60 min
S2	Kaiserslautern – Neustadt (Weinst) – Schifferstadt – Ludwigshafen – Mannheim – Heidelberg – Eberbach (– Mosbach)	665.1-2	DB Regio Südwest	60 min
S3	Germersheim – Speyer – Schifferstadt – Ludwigshafen – Mannheim – Heidelberg – Bruchsal – Karlsruhe	665.3-4	DB Regio Südwest	60 min
S4	Germersheim – Speyer – Schifferstadt – Ludwigshafen – Mannheim – Heidelberg – Bruchsal	665.3-4	DB Regio Südwest	60 min
S6	Mainz – Worms – Ludwigshafen – Mannheim (– Weinheim – Bensheim)	660	DB Regio Südwest	30 min
RE 1	Koblenz – Trier – Saarbrücken – Homburg – Kaiserslautern – Neustadt (Weinstraße) – Ludwigshafen – Mannheim	670, 685, 690	DB Regio Südwest	Individual services
RE 4	Mainz – Worms – Ludwigshafen – Speyer – Karlsruhe	660	DB Regio Südwest	120 min
RE 14	Mainz – Worms – Frankenthal – Ludwigshafen – Mannheim	660	DB Regio Südwest	Individual services
