= Ludwigshafen (Rhein) Mitte station =

Railway station in Ludwigshafen, Germany

Ludwigshafen (Rhein) Mitte
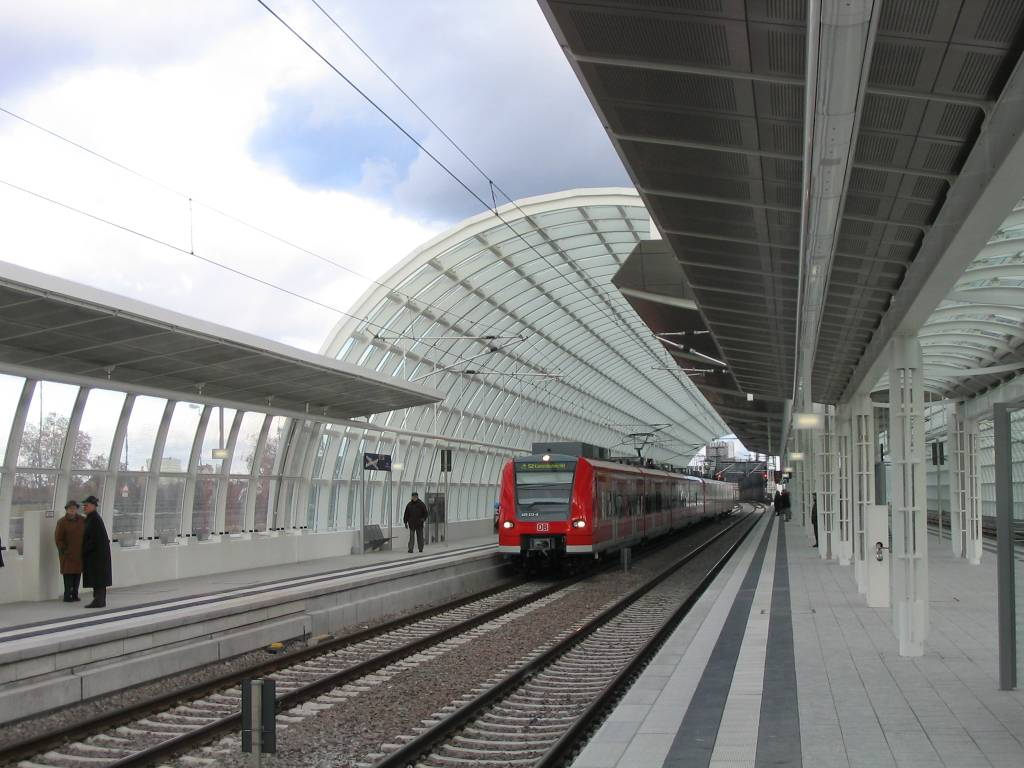
- Ludwigshafen (Rhein) Mitte station

General information
- Location: Yorkstr. 2, Ludwigshafen am Rhein, Rhineland-Palatinate; Germany
- Coordinates: 49°28′45″N 8°27′11″E
- Line: Palatine Ludwig Railway (KBS 670)
- Platforms: 3

Construction
- Accessible: Yes

Other information
- Station code: 7385
- DS100 code: RLSM
- IBNR: 8003759
- Category: 4
- Fare zone: VRN: 94
- Website: www.bahnhof.de

History
- Opened: 2003

Services
Preceding station	DB Regio Mitte	Following station
Neustadt (Weinstraße) Hbf towards Koblenz Hbf	RE 1 Südwest-Express	Mannheim Hbf towards Heidelberg Hbf
Ludwigshafen Hbf Terminus	RE 7 Sundays only	Mannheim Hbf towards Freudenstadt Hbf
Frankenthal Hbf towards Frankfurt (Main) Hbf	RE 14 Südwest-Express	Mannheim Hbf Terminus
Preceding station	Rhine-Neckar S-Bahn	Following station
Ludwigshafen (Rhein) Hbf towards Homburg (Saar) Hbf	S1	Mannheim Hbf towards Osterburken
Ludwigshafen (Rhein) Hbf towards Kaiserslautern Hbf	S2	Mannheim Hbf towards Mosbach (Baden)
Ludwigshafen (Rhein) Hbf towards Germersheim	S3	Mannheim Hbf towards Karlsruhe Hbf
Ludwigshafen (Rhein) Hbf towards Ludwigshafen (Rhein) BASF Nord	S4	Mannheim Hbf towards Ludwigshafen (Rhein) Hbf
Ludwigshafen (Rhein) Hbf towards Mainz Hbf	S6	Mannheim Hbf towards Bensheim
Location

The Ludwigshafen (Rhein) Mitte (German: middle) station is in the southern part of the centre of the city of Ludwigshafen am Rhein in the German state of Rhineland-Palatinate. It was established in 2003 and is classified by Deutsche Bahn as a category 4 station.

It is located next to the public transport hub of Berliner Platz and has good connections to all parts of the city of Mannheim and to the surrounding area.

The geographical position of Ludwigshafen Hauptbahnhof (central station) on the outskirts of the city made it necessary to build a new station in a central location at the so-called South Pole of the inner city. The station was opened on 14 December 2003 in the wake of the commissioning of the Rhine-Neckar S-Bahn. The elaborate design of the station was very well accepted by passengers from the beginning. This accelerated the Hauptbahnhof's loss of significance, so that some Regional-Express trains now stop in Ludwigshafen-Mitte, but not at the Hauptbahnhof.

== Station ==
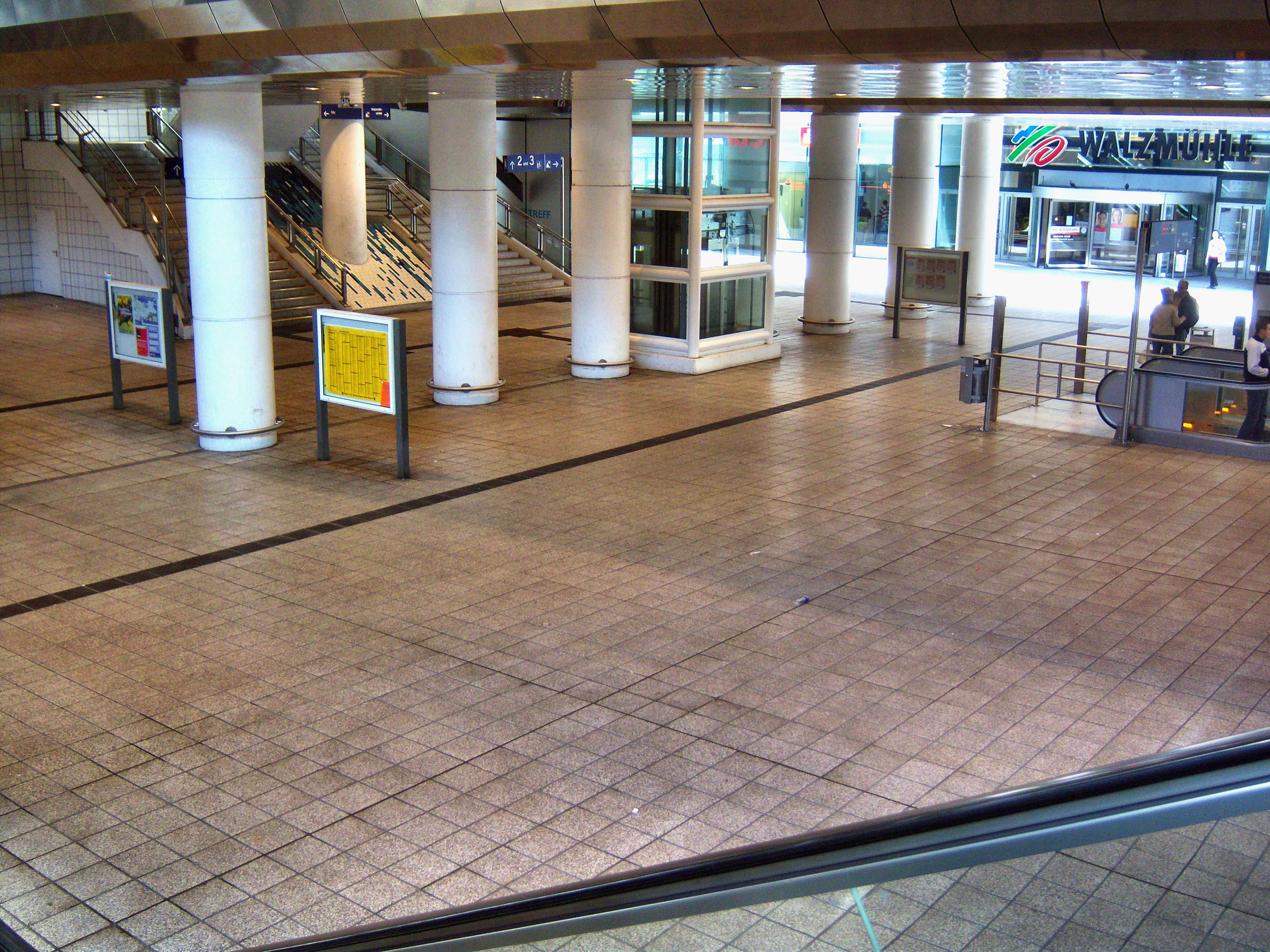
Station underpass with connection to Walzmühle shopping centre

The station has a side platform (platform track 1) and a central platform (tracks 2 and 3). The platforms for most of their length are covered by a glass roof and the building is full of light. In 2004, the station received the Renault Traffic Design Award, an architecture prize. A fourth track runs through the station on its southern side without access to a platform. This track is primarily used for freight trains passing through the station.

Originally the station was only intended for handling local transport, in particular the S-Bahn, with main line traffic expected to run between Mannheim Hauptbahnhof and Ludwigshafen Hauptbahnhof without stopping. Subsequently, however, plans were changed and the length of the platform was extended, so that Intercity-Express trains could stop at the station.

Just east of the station the line runs over the Konrad Adenauer Bridge to cross the Rhine. This means that the station is somewhat elevated. There is access from the eastern side of the station from the walkway between Berliner Platz and the Walzmühle shopping centre by stairs, escalators and lifts. There is access on the west side of the station via steps at the overpass over Mundenheimer Straße.

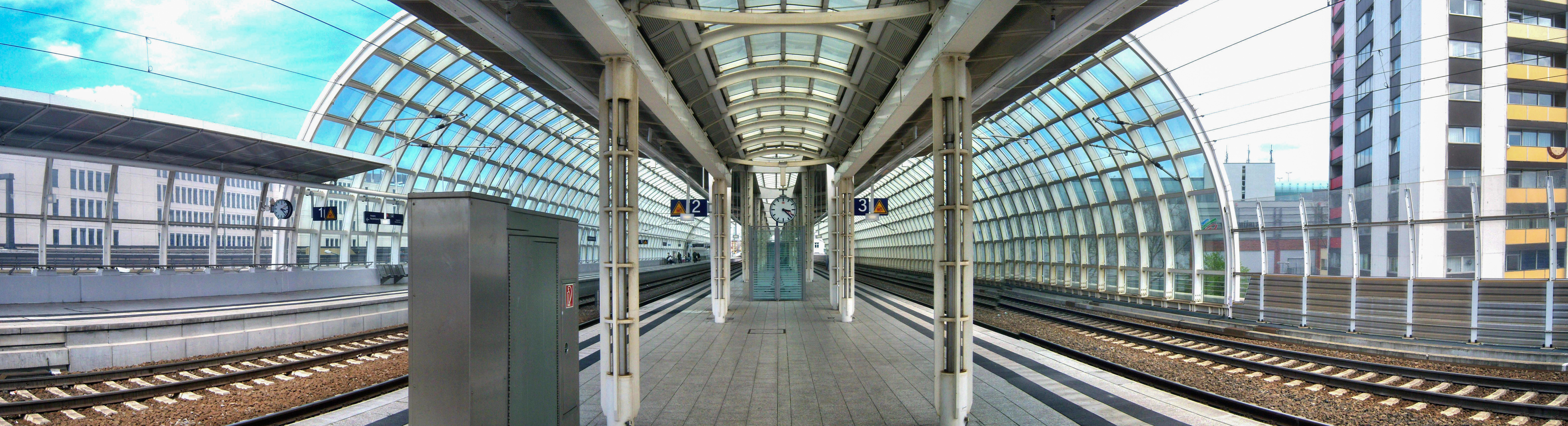
Panoramic view of Ludwigshafen (Rhein) Mitte station

== Connections ==
=== Rhine-Neckar S-Bahn ===
Line	Route	Frequency
S1	Homburg - Kaiserslautern – Neustadt – Schifferstadt – Ludwigshafen – Ludwigshafen Mitte – Mannheim – Heidelberg – Mosbach – Osterburken	Hourly
S2	Kaiserslautern – Neustadt – Schifferstadt – Ludwigshafen Hbf – Ludwigshafen Mitte – Mannheim – Heidelberg – Mosbach	Hourly
S3	Germersheim - Speyer – Schifferstadt – Ludwigshafen Hbf – Ludwigshafen Mitte – Mannheim – Heidelberg – Bruchsal – Karlsruhe	Hourly
S4	Germersheim - Speyer – Schifferstadt – Ludwigshafen Hbf – Ludwigshafen Mitte – Mannheim – Heidelberg – Bruchsal	Hourly
S6	Mannheim – Ludwigshafen Mitte – Ludwigshafen Hbf – Worms – Mainz	Hourly

=== Regional transport ===
Line	Route	Frequency
RE 1	Mannheim – Ludwigshafen Mitte – Neustadt – Kaiserslautern – Homburg – Saarbrücken – Trier – Koblenz	Every 2 hours
RE 14	Mannheim – Ludwigshafen Mitte – Ludwigshafen Hbf – Worms – Mainz	Every 2 hours

== See also ==
- Rail transport in Germany
- Railway stations in Germany
