= Ludwigshafen-Mundenheim station =

Category 5 railway station in Germany

Ludwigshafen Mundenheim
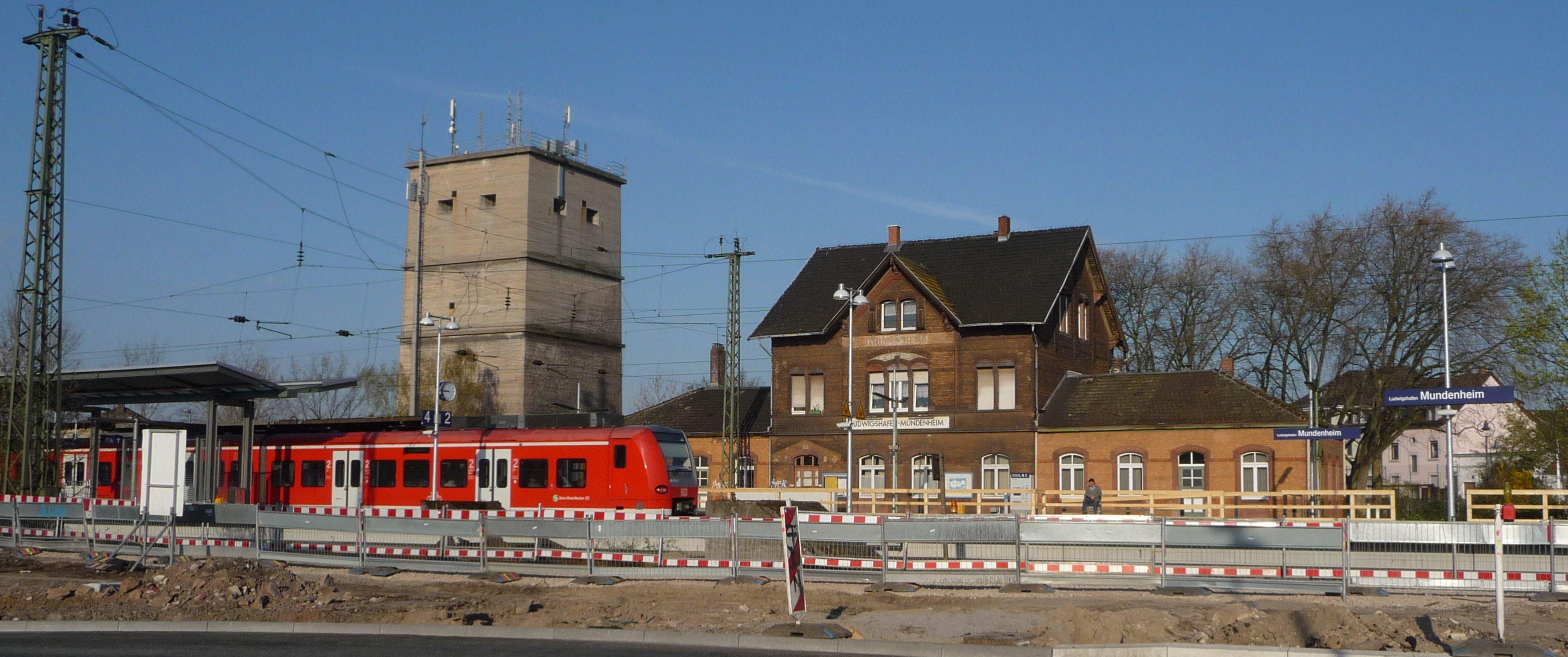
- Ludwigshafen-Mundenheim station in April 2009

General information
- Location: Wattstr. 126, Mundenheim, Ludwigshafen, Rhineland-Palatinate; Germany
- Coordinates: 49°27′42″N 8°25′16″E
- Lines: Mannheim–Saarbrücken (km 98.5) (KBS 665.1/665.2/670); Ludwigshafen–Meckenheim (closed, km 4.3); Ludwigshafen port railway (km 0.0)
- Platforms: 3 (1 disused)

Construction
- Accessible: Yes

Other information
- Station code: 3838
- DS100 code: RLUM
- IBNR: 8003765
- Category: 5
- Fare zone: VRN: 103
- Website: www.bahnhof.de

History
- Opened: 1886
- Former names: Mundenheim

Services
Preceding station	Rhine-Neckar S-Bahn	Following station
Ludwigshafen-Rheingönheim towards Homburg (Saar) Hbf	S1 selected trains only	Ludwigshafen (Rhein) Hbf towards Osterburken
Ludwigshafen-Rheingönheim towards Kaiserslautern Hbf	S2	Ludwigshafen (Rhein) Hbf towards Mosbach (Baden)
Ludwigshafen-Rheingönheim towards Germersheim	S3 selected trains only	Ludwigshafen (Rhein) Hbf towards Karlsruhe Hbf
Ludwigshafen-Rheingönheim towards Ludwigshafen (Rhein) BASF Nord	S4	Ludwigshafen (Rhein) Hbf Terminus
Location
- Location within Rhineland-Palatinate Location within Germany Location within Europe

Ludwigshafen-Mundenheim station—originally called Mundenheim—is in the Ludwigshafen suburb of Mundenheim in the German state of Rhineland-Palatinate. Deutsche Bahn classifies it as a category 5 station and it has three platform tracks and one through track without a platform. The station is located in the network of the Verkehrsverbund Rhein-Neckar (Rhine-Neckar transport association, VRN) and belongs to fare zone 103. Its address is Wattstraße 126.

It is located on the Mannheim–Saarbrücken railway and it was opened in 1886 under the name of Mundenheim. Four years later, on 15 October 1890, the narrow-gauge Ludwigshafen–Dannstadt railway was opened, making it an interchange station. This line was extended to Meckenheim on 1 March 1911. It was closed in 1955. Since December 2003, the station has been served by lines S1 and S2 of the Rhine-Neckar S-Bahn. In addition, a freight track branched off at the station.

== Location ==
The station is located in the west of the Ludwigshafen district of Mundenheim.

== History ==
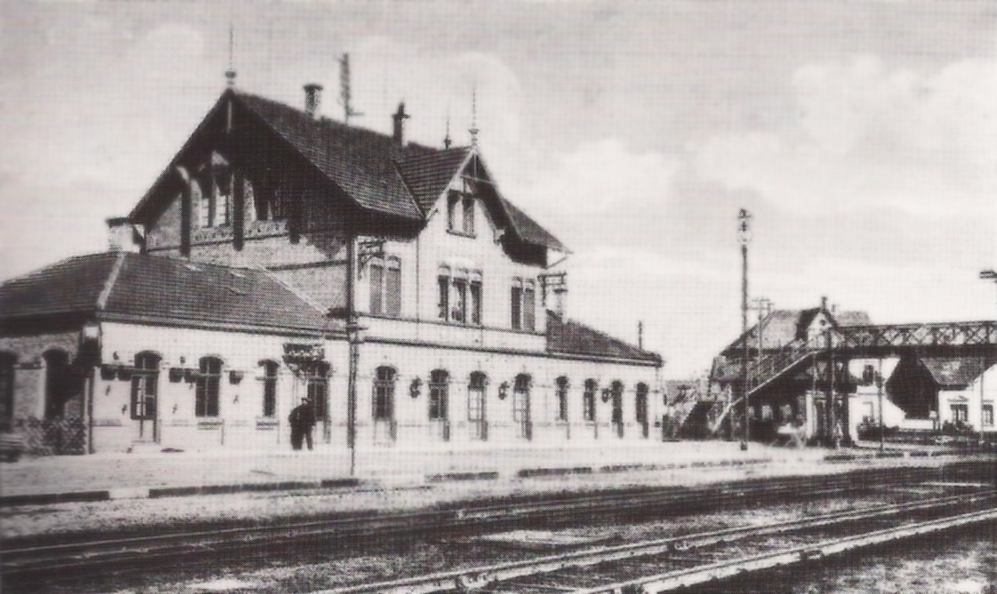
Mundenheim station about 1910

Mundenheim station was opened in 1886. Four years later, on 15 October 1890, the metre-gauge Ludwigshafen–Dannstadt railway was opened, which crossed the Mannheim–Saarbrücken railway (originally called the Palatinate Ludwig Railway or Pfalzische Ludwigsbahn) to the north of the station. The at-grade crossing of the tracks was controlled by signals. Mundenheim became the terminus. Years later, it was renamed Ludwigshafen-Mundenheim, thus taking account of the incorporation of the village into Ludwigshafen in 1899. On 1 March 1911, the narrow-gauge line was extended to Meckenheim. The narrow-gauge line was located parallel to Maudacher Straße; it had four tracks with platforms next to the entrance building. The freight track branched off from Maudach in the west before these platforms and ran south to the freight shed.

In 1922, the station was integrated into the newly founded Reichsbahndirektion (Reichsbahn railway division) of Ludwigshafen. From 1933, the narrow-gauge railway started from Mundenheim as the section to Ludwigshafen had been closed. A roundhouse and a servicing pit were built in the track triangle between the passenger and freight tracks in front of the entrance building. During the dissolution of the railway division of Ludwigshafen on 1 April 1937, it was transferred to the railway division of Mainz.

In 1955, the narrow-gauge line was closed to Meckenheim. In 1970, the ticket office was closed. On 1 August 1971, the station came under the jurisdiction of the railway division of Karlsruhe with the dissolution of the railway division of Mainz.

The Mannheim–Saarbrücken railway to Kaiserslautern was integrated into the network of the Rhine-Neckar S-Bahn in 2003. The S-Bahn was opened on 14 December 2003 and the station has been integrated in the network since then. The provision of access for the disabled at the station began after several delays, however, only in May 2008. Since decisions on had not yet been finalised on the station’s infrastructure, a temporary platform was built made of wood planks. After the barrier-free conversion of the island platform between tracks 2 and 4, the "house" platform on track 1 (next to the entrance building) was abandoned for passenger operations and access to the track was blocked off.

Mundenheim station is now administered as only a station part (Bahnhofsteil) of Ludwigshafen Hauptbahnhof.

== Freight ==
There was a loading track on the eastern side and on the western side to the south of the entrance building there was a freight shed that could be reached both from the standard gauge and narrow gauge tracks. To the south of the freight shed there were tracks for transferring loads between standard gauge and narrow gauge. To the south, there was a connecting line to the Süddeutschen Benzin oil refinery. To the east, a stretch of track runs to the Rhine and BASF.

== Sources ==
=== Further reading ===
- Wilhelm Distler; Jochen Glatt (2010). Die Lokalbahnen in der Vorderpfalz. Auf Schmalspurgleisen zwischen Meckenheim, Ludwigshafen, Frankenthal und Großkarlbach (in German). Ludwigshafen: Pro Message. ISBN 978-3-934845-43-5.
