= List of railway stations in Rhineland-Palatinate =

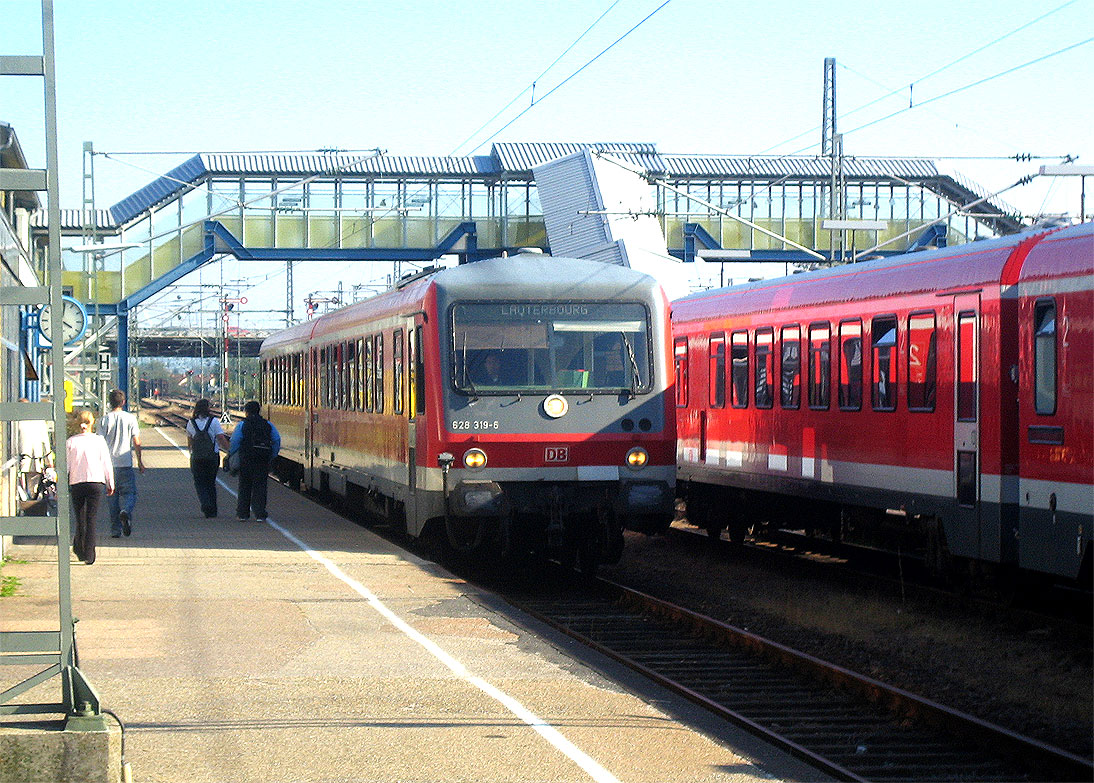
BR 628/928 at Wörth station

This list covers all passenger railway stations and halts in the Rhineland-Palatinate that are served by scheduled services.

== Description ==
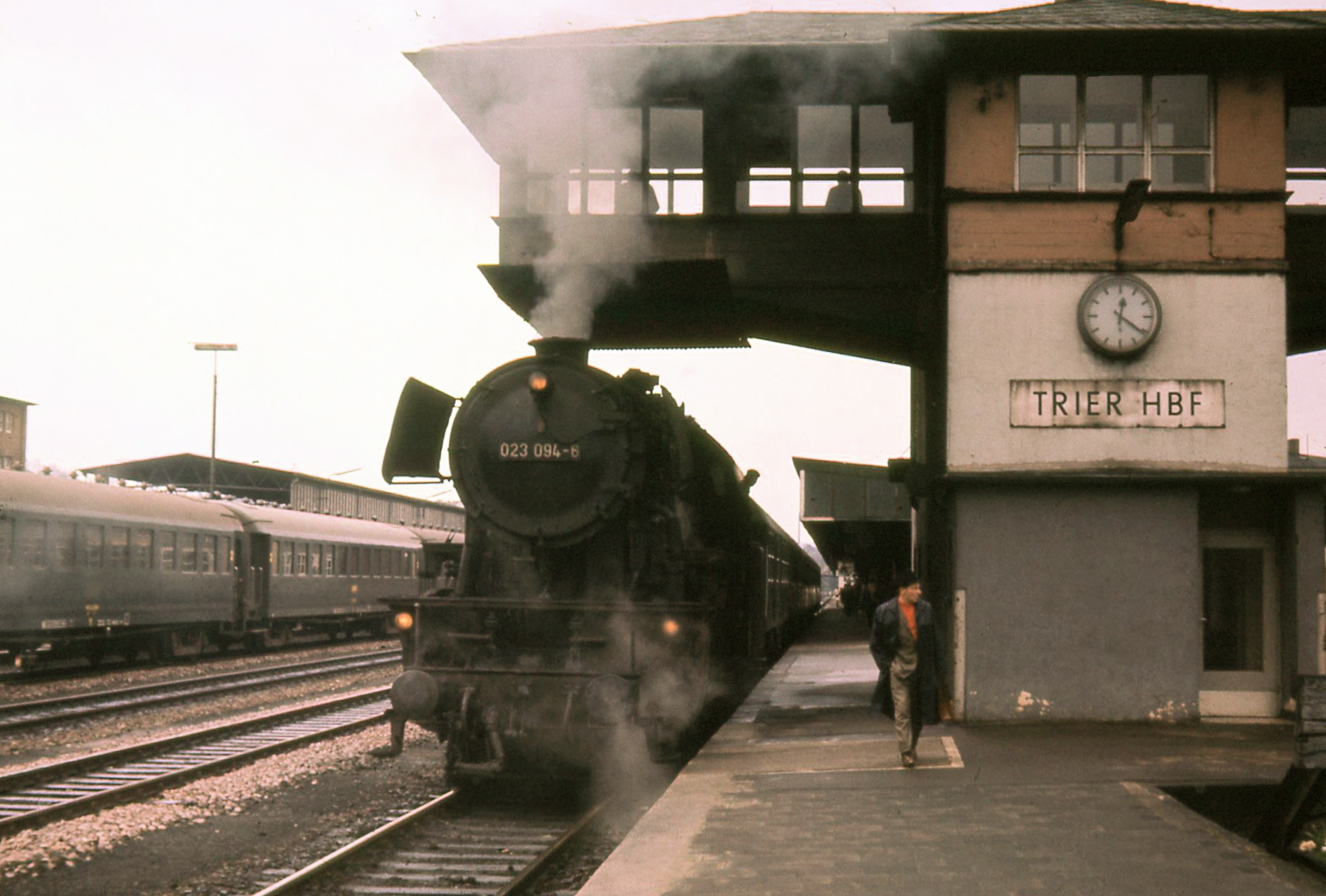
023 class 2-6-2 on local at Trier Hauptbahnhof, Easter 1973.

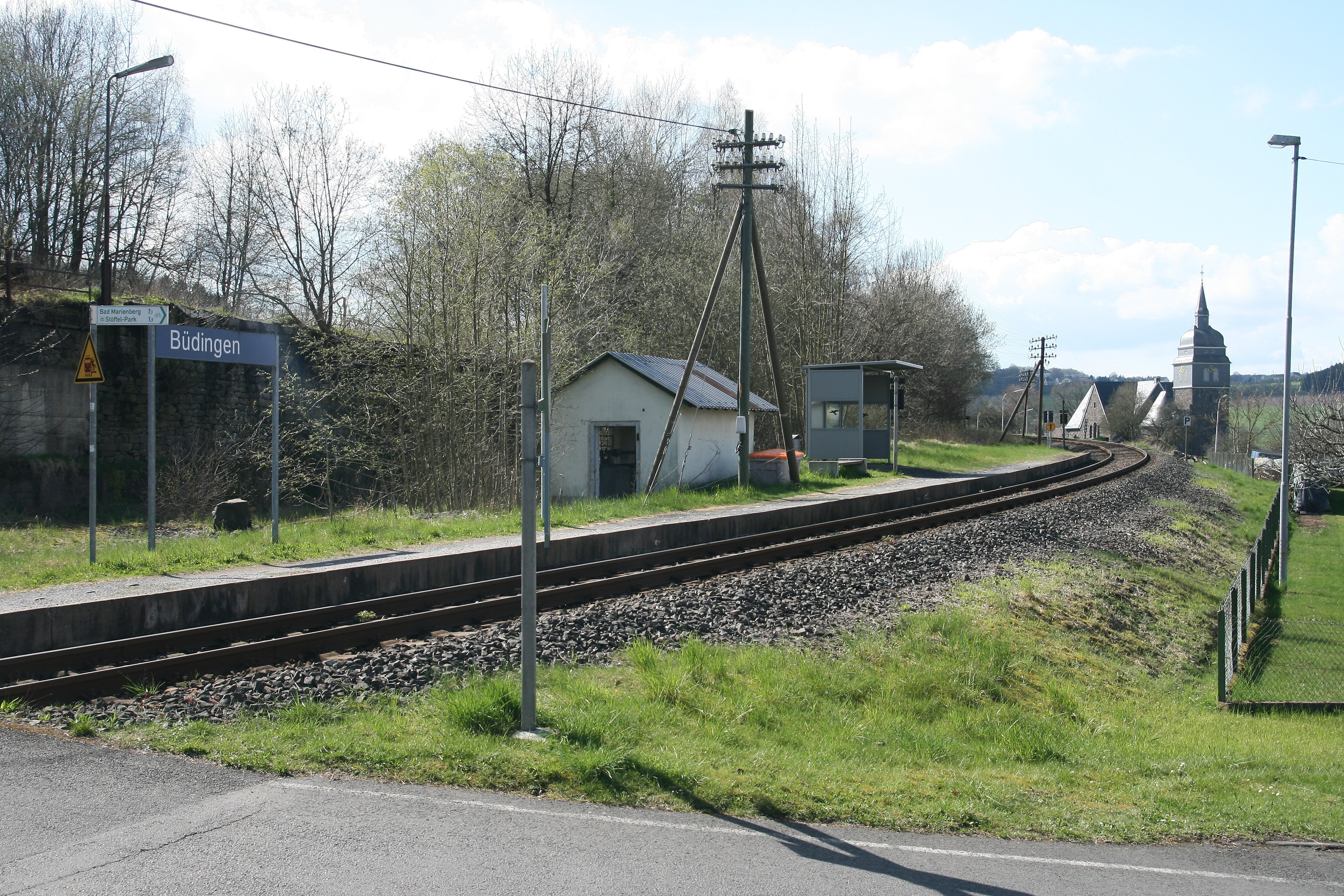
Train stop in Büdingen

This list is organised as follows:

- Name: current name of the station or halt.
- Urban/Rural county (Kreis): This columns gives the rural county or urban district in which the station is located. The abbreviations for these are given below and correspond to the German number plate scheme:
- Ahrweiler (AW)
- Altenkirchen (Westerwald) (AK)
- Alzey-Worms (AZ)
- Landkreis Bad Dürkheim (DÜW)
- Bad Kreuznach (KH)
- Bernkastel-Wittlich (WIL)
- Birkenfeld (BIR)
- Cochem-Zell (COC)
- Donnersbergkreis (KIB)
- Eifelkreis Bitburg-Prüm (BIT)
- Frankenthal (Pfalz) (FT)
- Germersheim (GER)
- Kaiserslautern (district) and Kaiserslautern (KL)
- Koblenz (KO)
- Kusel (KUS)
- Landau in der Pfalz (LD)
- Ludwigshafen am Rhein (LU)
- Mainz-Bingen and Mainz (MZ)
- Mayen-Koblenz (MYK)
- Neustadt an der Weinstrasse (NW)
- Neuwied (NR)
- Rhein-Hunsrück-Kreis (SIM)
- Rhein-Lahn-Kreis (EMS)
- Rhein-Pfalz-Kreis (RP)
- Speyer (SP)
- Südliche Weinstrasse (SÜW)
- Südwestpfalz and Pirmasens (PS)
- Trier-Saarburg and Trier (TR)
- Vulkaneifel (DAU)
- Westerwaldkreis (WW)
- Worms (WO)
- Zweibrücken (ZW)
- Railway operator: The state of Rhineland-Palatinate is covered by six railway operators. The counties of Altenkirchen (Westerwald) and the neighbouring Westerwaldkreis are the only ones not served by regional railway operators. In Altenkirchen (Westerwald) however transit fares are available for travelling to and from the main networks of the Verkehrsverbund Rhein-Sieg (VRS) and Westfalen-Tarif.
  - Karlsruher Verkehrsverbund (KVV)
  - Rhein-Main-Verkehrsverbund (RMV)
  - Rhein-Nahe-Nahverkehrsverbund (RNN)
  - Verkehrsverbund Rhein-Mosel (VRM)
  - Verkehrsverbund Rhein-Neckar (VRN)
  - Verkehrsverbund Region Trier (VRT)
- Cat: The Cat column shows the current categories of stations as at 1 January 2013. This only applies to DB Station&Service stations and does not include stations run by private operators like the Westerwaldbahn (WEG).
- The five remaining columns show which types of train serve the station. The abbreviations are those used by the DB AG, but apply to similar train types from the other operators:
  - ICE – Intercity-Express
  - NJ – Nightjet
  - IC – IC and EC
  - RE – Regional-Express
  - RB – Regionalbahn
  - S – S-Bahn and Stadtbahn Karlsruhe¹

¹ Stations on the Rhein-Haardtbahn are not included due to the tramway-like character of the route.

- Line – This column gives the railway on which the station is located. Only those routes which are still in operation are named.
- Remarks – In this column is additional information, particularly with regard to railway operators and remarks about seasonal services.

== Station overview ==
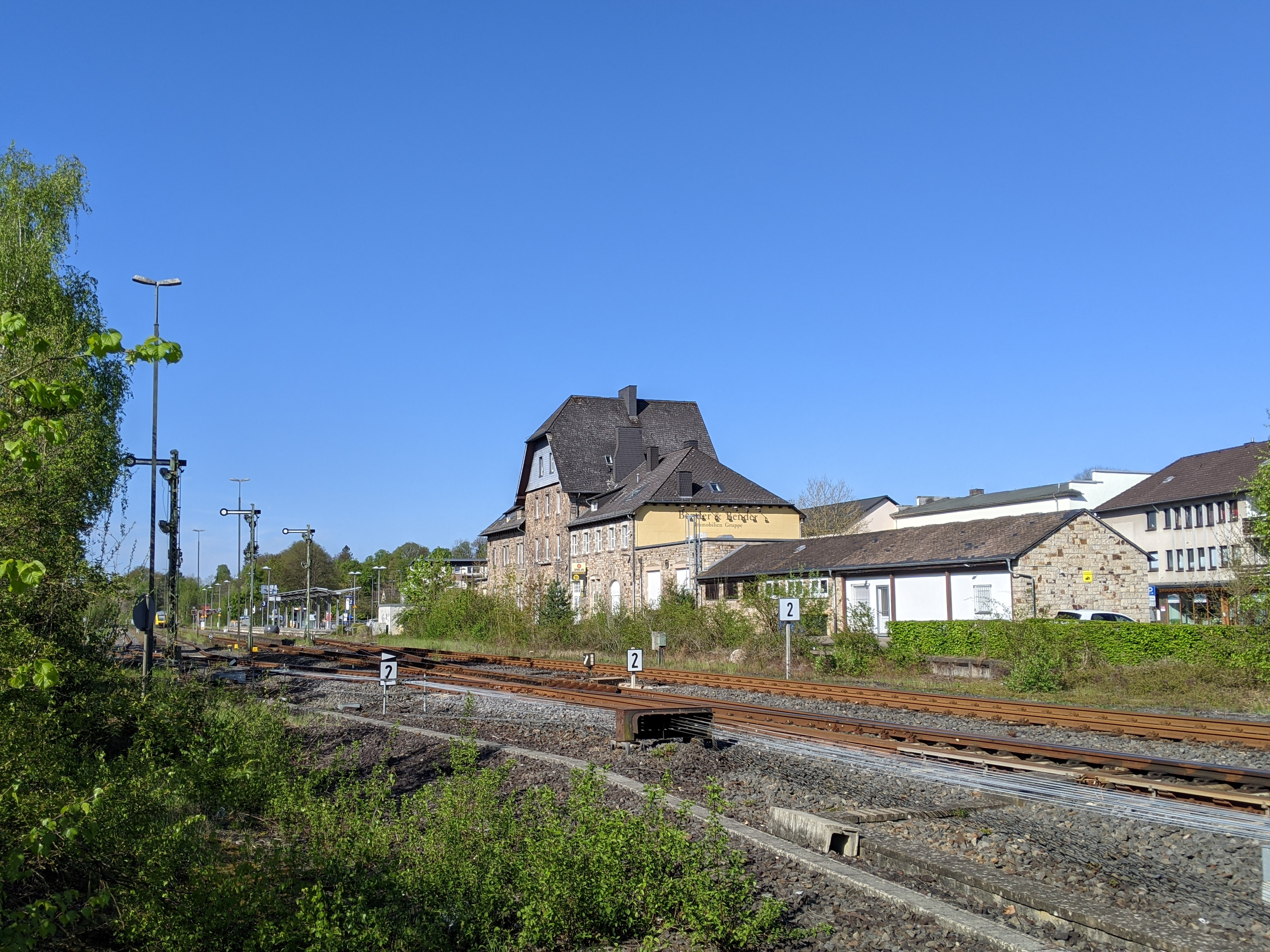
Altenkirchen (Westerw) station, passenger train section

Koblenz Stadtmitte station on Koblenz downtown snapped from the parking lot of the mall Löhr Center

Station	City/ District (Kreis)	Railway operator	Cat	ICE	IC	NJ	RE	RB	S	Line	Remarks
Ahrbrück	AW	VRM	6				x		Remagen–Adenau		
Ahrweiler	AW	VRM	6				x		Remagen–Adenau		
Ahrweiler Markt	AW	VRM	5				x		Remagen–Adenau		
Albersweiler (Pfalz)	SÜW	VRN; KVV	6				x		Landau–Pirmasens		
Albig	AZ	RNN	6				x		Alzey–Mainz; Worms–Bingen		
Albisheim	KIB	VRN				x			Monsheim-Langmeil	Only Sat & Sun; Owner: DTV	
Albsheim (Eis)	DÜW	VRN	6				x		Neustadt–Monsheim		
Alsdorf (Sieg)	AK	VRM, VRS					x		Betzdorf–Daaden	Owner: WEG	
Alsenz	KIB	VRN	6				x		Kaiserslautern–Bad Münster		
Alsheim	AZ	VRN	5				x		Mainz–Ludwigshafen		
Altenahr	AW	VRM	6				x		Remagen–Adenau		
Altenbamberg	KH	RNN	6				x		Kaiserslautern–Bad Münster		
Altenglan	KUS	VRN	6				x		Landstuhl–Kusel		
Altenkirchen (Westerw)	AK	VRM, VRS	6				x		Engers–Au; Limburg–Altenkirchen		
Alzey	AZ	VRN; RNN	3			x	x		Alzey–Mainz; Alzey–Marnheim; Worms–Bingen		
Alzey West	AZ	VRN; RNN				x	x		Alzey–Marnheim	Owner: RPE	
Alzey Süd	AZ	VRN; RNN	6			x	x		Worms–Bingen		
Andernach	MYK	VRM	3		x	x	x		Andernach–Gerolstein; Köln–Mainz		
Annweiler am Trifels	SÜW	VRN; KVV	5				x		Landau–Pirmasens		
Armsheim	AZ	RNN	5			x	x		Alzey–Mainz; Worms–Bingen		
Asselheim	DÜW	VRN	7				x		Grünstadt–Enkenbach		
Auw an der Kyll	BIT	VRT	6				x		Köln–Trier		
Bacharach	MZ	RNN	6				x		Köln–Mainz		
Bad Bergzabern	SÜW	VRN; KVV	6				x		Winden–Bad Bergzabern		
Bad Bodendorf	AW	VRM	6				x		Remagen–Adenau		
Bad Breisig	AW	VRM	5			x	x		Köln–Mainz		
Bad Dürkheim	DÜW	VRN	4			x	x		Neustadt–Monsheim		
Bad Dürkheim-Trift	DÜW	VRN	6				x		Neustadt–Monsheim		
Bad Ems	EMS	VRM	5			x	x		Wetzlar–Koblenz		
Bad Ems West	EMS	VRM	6				x		Wetzlar–Koblenz		
Bad Hönningen	NR	VRM; VRS	4			x	x		Köln–Wiesbaden		
Bad Kreuznach	KH	RNN	3			x	x		Bingen–Saarbrücken; Gau Algesheim–Bad Kreuznach		
Bad Münster am Stein	KH	RNN	4			x	x		Bingen–Saarbrücken; Kaiserslautern–Bad Münster		
Bad Neuenahr	AW	VRM	5				x		Remagen–Adenau		
Bad Sobernheim	KH	RNN	5			x	x		Bingen–Saarbrücken		
Balduinstein	EMS	VRM	6				x		Wetzlar–Koblenz		
Barbelroth	SÜW	VRN; KVV	7				x		Winden–Bad Bergzabern		
Bellheim	GER	VRN; KVV	6				x		Schifferstadt–Wörth		
Bengel	WIL	VRT	6				x		Koblenz–Trier		
Berg (Pfalz)	GER	VRN; KVV	7				x		Wörth–Lauterbourg		
Berghausen (Pfalz)	RP	VRN	6				x	x	Schifferstadt–Wörth		
Berzhahn	WW	VRM	7				x		Limburg–Altenkirchen		
Betzdorf (Sieg)	AK	VRM, VRS, Westfalentarif	3			x	x		Betzdorf–Daaden; Betzdorf–Dillenburg, Köln–Siegen	Betzdorf–Daaden	Owner: WEG
Biersdorf (Westerw) Ort	AK	VRM, VRS					x		Betzdorf–Daaden	Owner: WEG	
Bingen Hbf	MZ	RNN	4	x	x	x	x		Bingen–Saarbrücken; Köln–Mainz		
Bingen (Rhein) Stadt	MZ	RNN	4				x		Köln–Mainz; Worms–Bingen		
Bingen-Gaulsheim	MZ	RNN	6				x		Köln–Mainz		
Birresborn	DAU	VRT	6				x		Köln–Trier		
Bitburg-Erdorf	BIT	VRT	6			x	x		Köln–Trier		
Bobenheim	RP	VRN	5				x		Mainz–Ludwigshafen		
Bockenheim-Kindenheim	DÜW	VRN	6			x	x		Neustadt–Monsheim		
Bodenheim	MZ	RNN	4				x		Mainz–Ludwigshafen		
Böhl-Iggelheim	RP	VRN	5				x	x	Mannheim–Saarbrücken		
Boppard-Bad Salzig	SIM	VRM	5				x		Köln–Mainz		
Boppard-Buchholz	SIM	VRM	7				x		Simmern–Boppard		
Boppard-Fleckertshöhe	SIM	VRM	7				x		Simmern–Boppard		
Boppard Hbf	SIM	VRM	4			x	x		Köln–Mainz; Simmern–Boppard		
Boppard-Hirzenach	SIM	VRM	6				x		Köln–Mainz		
Boppard Süd	SIM	VRM	7				x		Simmern–Boppard		
Brachbach	AK	VRM, VRS, Westfalentarif	6			x		Köln–Siegen			
Braubach	EMS	VRM	6			x	x		Köln–Wiesbaden		
Breitscheidt (Kr Altenkirchen)	AK	VRM, VRS	7				x		Engers–Au		
Bretzenheim (Nahe)	KH	RNN	6				x		Bingen–Saarbrücken		
Brohl	COC	VRM	5				x		Köln–Mainz		
Bruchmühlbach-Miesau	KL	VRN	6				x	x	Mannheim–Saarbrücken		
Bruchweiler	PS	VRN					x		Hinterweidenthal–Bundenthal-Rumbach	Only Sat & Sun; Owner: AVG	
Budenheim	MZ	RNN	5				x		Köln–Mainz		
Büdingen	WW	VRM	7				x		Limburg–Altenkirchen		
Bullay DB	COC	VRM	3	x	x	x	x		Bullay–Traben-Trarbach; Koblenz–Trier		
Bundenthal-Rumbach	PS	VRN					x		Hinterweidenthal–Bundenthal-Rumbach	Only Sat & Sun; Owner: AVG	
Busenberg-Schindhard	PS	VRN					x		Hinterweidenthal–Bundenthal-Rumbach	Only Sat & Sun; Owner: AVG	
Cochem (Mosel)	COC	VRM	4	x	x	x	x		Koblenz–Trier		
Contwig	PS	VRN	7				x		Pirmasens–Rohrbach		
Daaden	AK	VRM, VRS; ZWS					x		Betzdorf–Daaden	Owner: WEG	
Dahn	PS	VRN					x		Hinterweidenthal–Bundenthal-Rumbach	Only Sat & Sun; Owner: AVG	
Dahn Süd	PS	VRN					x		Hinterweidenthal–Bundenthal-Rumbach	Only Sat & Sun; Owner: AVG	
Daufenbach	TR	VRT	6				x		Köln–Trier		
Dausenau	EMS	VRM	5				x		Wetzlar–Koblenz		
Deidesheim	DÜW	VRN	6			x	x		Neustadt–Monsheim		
Dellfeld	PS	VRN	6				x		Pirmasens–Rohrbach		
Dellfeld Ort	PS	VRN	6				x		Pirmasens–Rohrbach		
Densborn	DAU	VRT	6				x		Köln–Trier		
Dernau	AW	VRM	5				x		Remagen–Adenau		
Dernbach (Westerw)	WW	VRM	6				x		Limburg–Siershahn		
Diez	EMS	VRM	5			x	x		Wetzlar–Koblenz		
Diez Ost	EMS	VRM, RMV	6				x		Limburg–Altenkirchen		
Dreikirchen	WW	VRM	7				x		Limburg–Siershahn		
Ebertsheim	DÜW	VRN	7				x		Grünstadt–Enkenbach		
Edenkoben	SÜW	VRN; KVV	6				x		Neustadt–Wissembourg		
Edesheim (Pfalz)	SÜW	VRN; KVV	6				x		Neustadt–Wissembourg		
Ediger-Eller	COC	VRM	6				x		Koblenz–Trier		
Ehr	SIM	VRM	7				x		Simmern–Boppard		
Ehrang	TR	VRT	5				x		Koblenz–Trier; Köln–Trier		
Ehrang Ort	TR	VRT	6				x		Koblenz–Trier		
Einsiedlerhof	KL	VRN	6					x	Mannheim–Saarbrücken		
Eisenbach-Matzenbach	KUS	VRN	7				x		Landstuhl–Kusel		
Eisenberg (Pfalz)	KIB	VRN	6				x		Grünstadt–Enkenbach		
Eiswoog	KIB	VRN	7				x		Grünstadt–Enkenbach	Only Sat & Sun	
Emmelshausen	SIM	VRM	7				x		Simmern–Boppard		
Engers	NR	VRM	5			x			Köln–Wiesbaden		
Enkenbach	KL	VRN	6				x		Hochspeyer–Enkenbach; Kaiserslautern–Bad Münster		
Enspel	WW	VRM	7				x		Limburg–Altenkirchen		
Eppelsheim (Rheinhess)	AZ	VRN	6			x	x		Worms–Bingen		
Erpel (Rhein)	NR	VRM; VRS	6				x		Köln–Wiesbaden		
Erpolzheim	DÜW	VRN	6				x		Neustadt–Monsheim		
Etzbach	AK	VRM, VRS, Westfalentarif	6			x	x		Köln–Siegen		
Fachingen (Lahn)	EMS	VRM	6				x		Wetzlar–Koblenz		
Fischbach-Weierbach	BIR	RNN	6				x		Bingen–Saarbrücken		
Filsen	EMS	VRM	6				x		Köln–Wiesbaden		
Flomersheim	FT	VRN	6				x		Freinsheim–Frankenthal		
Föhren	TR	VRT	6				x		Koblenz–Trier		
Frankenstein (Pfalz)	KL	VRN	6				x	x	Mannheim–Saarbrücken		
Frankenthal Hauptbahnhof	FT	VRN	3			x	x		Freinsheim–Frankenthal; Mainz–Ludwigshafen		
Freimersheim	AZ	VRN				x	x		Alzey–Marnheim	Owner: RPE	
Freinsheim	DÜW	VRN	4			x	x		Freinsheim–Frankenthal; Neustadt–Monsheim		
Freusburg Siedlung	AK	VRM, VRS, Westfalentarif	6				x		Köln–Siegen		
Friedrichssegen	EMS	VRM	6				x		Wetzlar–Koblenz		
Galgenschanze	KL	VRN	6				x		Kaiserslautern–Pirmasens		
Gau Algesheim	MZ	RNN	5				x		Gau Algesheim–Bad Kreuznach; Köln–Mainz		
Gau Bickelheim	AZ	RNN	7				x		Worms–Bingen		
Gensingen-Horrweiler	MZ	RNN	5			x	x		Gau Algesheim–Bad Kreuznach; Worms–Bingen		
Germersheim	GER	VRN; KVV	5			x	x	x	Bruchsal–Germersheim; Schifferstadt–Wörth		
Gerolstein	DAU	VRT; VRS	4			x	x		Köln–Trier		
Girod	WW	VRM	7				x		Limburg–Siershahn		
Glan-Münchweiler	KUS	VRN	6				x		Landstuhl–Kusel		
Godramstein	LD	VRN; KVV	6				x		Landau–Pirmasens		
Goldhausen	WW	VRM	6				x		Limburg–Siershahn		
Göllheim-Dreisen	KIB	VRN				x			Monsheim-Langmeil	Only Sat & Sun; Owner: DTV	
Grünebach Ort	AK	VRM, VRS	7				x		Betzdorf–Dillenburg	Request stop	
Grünebacher Hütte	AK	VRM, VRS	7				x		Betzdorf–Dillenburg	Request stop	
Grünstadt	DÜW	VRN	4			x	x		Grünstadt–Enkenbach; Neustadt–Monsheim		
Grünstadt Nord	DÜW	VRN	7				x		Grünstadt–Enkenbach		
Gundersheim (Rheinhess)	AZ	VRN	7			x	x		Worms–Bingen		
Guntersblum	MZ	RNN	5				x		Mainz–Ludwigshafen		
Hachenburg	WW	VRM	6				x		Limburg–Altenkirchen		
Hagenbach	GER	VRN; KVV	6				x		Wörth–Lauterbourg		
Harxheim-Zell	KIB	VRN				x			Monsheim-Langmeil	Only Sat & Sun; Owner: DTV	
Hassloch (Pfalz)	DÜW	VRN	4				x	x	Mannheim–Saarbrücken		
Hattert	WW	VRM	7				x		Koblenz–Trier		
Hatzenport	MYK	VRM	6				x		Koblenz–Trier		
Hauenstein (Pfalz)	PS	VRN	7				x		Landau–Pirmasens		
Hauptstuhl	KL	VRN	6				x	x	Mannheim–Saarbrücken		
Heidesheim (Rheinhess)	MZ	RNN	5				x		Köln–Mainz		
Heiligenstein (Pfalz)	RP	VRN	5				x	x	Schifferstadt–Wörth		
Heimbach (Nahe)	BIR	RNN	6				x		Bingen–Saarbrücken		
Heimersheim	AW	VRM	6				x		Remagen–Adenau		
Heinzenhausen	KUS	VRN	7				x		Kaiserslautern–Lauterecken-Grumbach		
Herdorf	AK	VRM, VRS	6				x		Betzdorf–Dillenburg		
Herxheim am Berg	DÜW	VRN	6				x		Neustadt–Monsheim		
Hetzrath	WIL	VRT	5				x		Koblenz–Trier		
Hinterweidenthal	PS	VRN	6				x		Landau–Pirmasens		
Hinterweidenthal Ort	PS	VRN					x		Hinterweidenthal–Bundenthal-Rumbach	Only Sat & Sun; Owner: AVG	
Hinterweidenthal Ost	PS	VRN	6				x		Hinterweidenthal–Bundenthal-Rumbach; Landau–Pirmasens		
Hirschhorn (Pfalz)	KL	VRN	6				x		Kaiserslautern–Lauterecken-Grumbach		
Hochspeyer	KL	VRN	4			x	x	x	Hochspeyer–Enkenbach; Mannheim–Saarbrücken		
Hochstätten (Pfalz)	KH	RNN	6				x		Kaiserslautern–Bad Münster		
Hochstetten (Nahe)	KH	RNN	6				x		Bingen–Saarbrücken		
Hohegrete	AK	VRM, VRS	7				x		Engers–Au	Request stop	
Hohensülzen	AZ	VRN	7				x		Neustadt–Monsheim		
Höhmühlbach	PS	VRN	7				x		Pirmasens–Rohrbach		
Hoppstädten (Nahe)	BIR	RNN	6				x		Bingen–Saarbrücken		
Hüttingen	BIT	VRT	7				x		Köln–Trier		
Idar-Oberstein	BIR	RNN	4			x	x		Bingen–Saarbrücken		
Igel	TR	VRT	6			x			Luxemburg–Trier		
Imsweiler	KIB	VRN	6				x		Kaiserslautern–Bad Münster		
Ingelbach	AK	VRM, VRS	7				x		Limburg–Altenkirchen		
Ingelheim	MZ	RNN	4			x	x		Köln–Mainz		
Insheim	SÜW	VRN; KVV	6				x		Neustadt–Wissembourg		
Jockgrim	GER	VRN; KVV	6				x		Schifferstadt–Wörth		
Jünkerath	DAU	VRT; VRS	5			x	x		Köln–Trier		
Kaisersesch	COC	VRM	6				x		Andernach–Gerolstein		
Kaiserslautern Hbf	KL	VRN	2	x	x	x	x	x	Kaiserslautern–Enkenbach; Kaiserslautern–Lauterecken-Grumbach; Kaiserslautern–Pirmasens; Mannheim–Saarbrücken		
Kaiserslautern Pfaffwerk	KL	VRN	7				x		Kaiserslautern–Lauterecken-Grumbach		
Kaiserslautern West	KL	VRN	6				x		Kaiserslautern–Lauterecken-Grumbach		
Kamp-Bornhofen	EMS	VRM	6			x	x		Köln–Wiesbaden		
Kandel	GER	VRN; KVV	5			x	x		Winden–Karlsruhe		
Kanzem	TR	VRT	6				x		Saarbrücken–Trier		
Kapellen-Drusweiler	SÜW	VRN; KVV	7				x		Winden–Bad Bergzabern		
Kapsweyer	SÜW	VRN; KVV	7				x		Neustadt–Wissembourg		
Kattenes	MYK	VRM	6				x		Koblenz–Trier		
Katzweiler	KL	VRN	7				x		Kaiserslautern–Lauterecken-Grumbach		
Karthaus	TR	VRT	4			x	x		Luxemburg–Trier; Saarbrücken–Trier; Trier–Metz		
Kaub	EMS	VRM	5			x	x		Köln–Wiesbaden		
Kennelgarten	KL	VRN	6					x	Mannheim–Saarbrücken		
Kestert	EMS	VRM	6				x		Köln–Wiesbaden		
Kindsbach	KL	VRN	6				x	x	Mannheim–Saarbrücken		
Kirchen	AK	VRM, VRS, Westfalentarif	5			x	x		Köln–Siegen		
Kirchheim (Weinstrasse)	DÜW	VRN	6				x		Neustadt–Monsheim		
Kirchheimbolanden	AZ	VRN				x	x		Alzey–Marnheim	Owner: RPE	
Kirn	KH	RNN	5			x	x		Bingen–Saarbrücken		
Kirnsulzbach	KH	RNN	6				x		Bingen–Saarbrücken		
Klein Winternheim-Ober Olm	MZ	RNN	6				x		Alzey–Mainz		
Kloster Marienthal	AK	VRM, VRS	7				x		Engers–Au	Request stop	
Klotten	COC	VRM	6				x		Koblenz–Trier		
Knöringen-Essingen	SÜW	VRN; KVV	6				x		Neustadt–Wissembourg		
Kobern-Gondorf	MYK	VRM	5			x	x		Koblenz–Trier		
Koblenz-Ehrenbreitstein	KO	VRM	5			x			Köln–Wiesbaden		
Koblenz-Gülss	KO	VRM	6				x		Koblenz–Trier		
Koblenz Hbf	KO	VRM	2	x	x	x	x	x		Koblenz–Trier; Köln–Mainz; Wetzlar–Koblenz	
Koblenz-Lützel	KO	VRM	5				x		Köln–Mainz		
Koblenz-Moselweiss	KO	VRM	6				x		Koblenz–Trier		
Koblenz Stadtmitte	KO	VRM	4			x	x		Köln–Mainz; Neuwied–Koblenz		
Konz	TR	VRT	5			x	x		Saarbrücken–Trier		
Konz Mitte	TR	VRT	6			x	x		Trier–Metz		
Kordel	TR	VRT	6			x	x		Köln–Trier		
Königsstollen	AK	VRM, VRS	7				x		Betzdorf–Dillenburg	Request stop	
Kottenheim	MYK	VRM	6				x		Andernach–Gerolstein		
Kövenig	WIL	VRT	7				x		Bullay–Traben-Trarbach		
Kreimbach-Kaulbach	KUS	VRN	7				x		Kaiserslautern–Lauterecken-Grumbach		
Kreuzberg (Ahr)	AW	VRM	6				x		Remagen–Adenau		
Kronweiler	BIR	RNN	6				x		Bingen–Saarbrücken		
Kruft	MYK	VRM	6				x		Andernach–Gerolstein		
Kusel	KUS	VRN	6				x		Landstuhl–Kusel		
Kyllburg	BIT	VRT	6			x	x		Köln–Trier		
Lambrecht (Pfalz)	DÜW	VRN	4				x	x	Mannheim–Saarbrücken		
Lambsheim	RP	VRN	6				x		Freinsheim–Frankenthal		
Lampertsmühle-Otterbach	KL	VRN	6				x		Kaiserslautern–Lauterecken-Grumbach		
Landau (Pfalz) Hbf	LD	VRN; KVV	4			x	x		Landau–Pirmasens; Neustadt–Wissembourg		
Landau (Pfalz) West	LD	VRN; KVV	6				x		Landau–Pirmasens		
Landstuhl	KL	VRN	3			x	x	x	Landstuhl–Kusel; Mannheim–Saarbrücken		
Langenhahn	WW	VRM	6				x		Limburg–Altenkirchen		
Langenlonsheim	KH	RNN	6				x		Bingen–Saarbrücken		
Laubenheim (Nahe)	KH	RNN	6				x		Bingen–Saarbrücken		
Laurenburg (Lahn)	EMS	VRM	6				x		Wetzlar–Koblenz		
Lauterecken-Grumbach	KUS	VRN	6				x		Kaiserslautern–Lauterecken-Grumbach		
Lehmen	MYK	VRM	6				x		Koblenz–Trier		
Leubsdorf (Rhein)	NR	VRM; VRS	6				x		Köln–Wiesbaden		
Leutesdorf (Rhein)	NR	VRM; VRS	5				x		Köln–Wiesbaden		
Limburgerhof	RP	VRN	4				x	x	Mannheim–Saarbrücken		
Lingenfeld	GER	VRN; KVV	6				x	x	Schifferstadt–Wörth		
Linz (Rhein)	NR	VRM; VRS	4			x	x		Köln–Wiesbaden		
Lissendorf	DAU	VRT; VRS	6			x	x		Köln–Trier		
Löf	MYK	VRM	6				x		Koblenz–Trier		
Lohnweiler	KUS	VRN	6				x		Kaiserslautern–Lauterecken-Grumbach		
Ludwigshafen (Rhein) BASF Mitte	LU	VRN					x		Ludwigshafen–BASF	Only Mo–Fr	
Ludwigshafen (Rhein) BASF Nord	LU	VRN					x		Ludwigshafen–BASF	Only Mo–Fr	
Ludwigshafen (Rhein) BASF Süd	LU	VRN					x		Ludwigshafen–BASF	Only Mo–Fr	
Ludwigshafen (Rhein) Hbf	LU	VRN	2		x	x	x	x	Ludwigshafen–BASF; Mainz–Ludwigshafen; Mannheim–Ludwigshafen		
Ludwigshafen (Rhein) Mitte	LU	VRN	3			x	x	x	Mannheim–Ludwigshafen		
Ludwigshafen-Mundenheim	LU	VRN	5				x	x	Mannheim–Saarbrücken		
Ludwigshafen-Oggersheim		LU	VRN	5				x		Mainz–Ludwigshafen	
Ludwigshafen-Rheingönheim	LU	VRN	4				x	x	Mannheim–Saarbrücken		
Maikammer-Kirrweiler	SÜW	VRN; KVV	6				x		Neustadt–Wissembourg		
Mainz-Gonsenheim	MZ	RNN; RMV	6				x		Alzey–Mainz		
Mainz Hbf	MZ	RNN; RMV	2	x	x	x	x	x	x	Alzey–Mainz; Köln–Mainz; Mainz–Aschaffenburg; Mainz–Frankfurt; Mainz–Ludwigshafen; Mainz–Wiesbaden	
Mainz-Laubenheim	MZ	RNN; RMV	5				x		Mainz–Ludwigshafen		
Mainz-Marienborn	MZ	RNN; RMV	7				x		Alzey–Mainz		
Mainz-Mombach	MZ	RNN; RMV	6				x		Köln–Mainz		
Mainz Nord	MZ	RNN; RMV	5					x	Mainz–Wiesbaden		
Mainz Römisches Theater	MZ	RNN; RMV	3			x	x	x	Mainz–Aschaffenburg; Mainz–Frankfurt; Mainz–Ludwigshafen		
Marnheim	KIB	VRN				x			Monsheim-Langmeil	Only Sat & Sun; Owner: DTV	
Martinstein	KH	RNN	6				x		Bingen–Saarbrücken		
Mayen Ost	MYK	VRM	6				x		Andernach–Gerolstein		
Mayen West	MYK	VRM	6				x		Andernach–Gerolstein		
Mayschoss	AW	VRM	7				x		Remagen–Adenau		
Maximiliansau Eisenbahnstrasse	GER	VRN; KVV						x	Winden–Karlsruhe		
Maximiliansau im Rüsten	GER	VRN; KVV	7				x		Wörth–Lauterbourg		
Maximiliansau West	GER	VRN; KVV						x	Winden–Karlsruhe		
Mendig	MYK	VRM	6				x		Andernach–Gerolstein		
Mertesheim	DÜW	VRN	7				x		Grünstadt–Enkenbach		
Mettenheim	AZ	VRN	5				x		Mainz–Ludwigshafen		
Miesenbach	KL	VRN	7				x		Landstuhl–Kusel		
Miesenheim	MYK	VRM	6				x		Andernach–Gerolstein		
Monreal	MYK	VRM	7				x		Andernach–Gerolstein		
Monsheim	AZ	VRN	5			x	x		Neustadt–Monsheim; Worms–Bingen; Monsheim-Langmeil		
Montabaur	WW	VRM	4	x			x		SFS Köln–Rhein/Main; Limburg–Siershahn		
Monzingen	KH	RNN	6				x		Bingen–Saarbrücken		
Moselkern	COC	VRM	6				x		Koblenz–Trier		
Müden (Mosel)	COC	VRM	6				x		Koblenz–Trier		
Mudersbach	AK	VRM, VRS, Westfalentarif	6				x		Köln–Siegen		
Münchweiler (Alsenz)	KIB	VRN	6			x	x		Kaiserslautern–Bad Münster		
Münchweiler (Rodalb)	PS	VRN	6				x		Landau–Pirmasens		
Münster-Sarmsheim	MZ	RNN	6				x		Bingen–Saarbrücken		
Mürlenbach	DAU	VRT	6				x		Köln–Trier		
Mussbach	NW	VRN	6				x		Neustadt–Monsheim		
Nackenheim	MZ	RNN	6				x		Mainz–Ludwigshafen		
Namedy	MYK	VRM	6				x		Köln–Mainz		
Nassau (Lahn)	EMS	VRM	5			x	x		Wetzlar–Koblenz		
Neef	COC	VRM	6				x		Koblenz–Trier		
Neidenfels	DÜW	VRN	6				x	x	Mannheim–Saarbrücken		
Neubrücke (Nahe)	BIR	RNN	4			x	x		Bingen–Saarbrücken		
Neuburg (Rhein)	GER	VRN; KVV	7				x		Wörth–Lauterbourg		
Neustadt (Weinstr)-Böbig	NW	VRN	4				x	x	Mannheim–Saarbrücken; Neustadt–Monsheim		
Neustadt (Weinstr) Hbf	NW	VRN	2	x	x	x	x	x	Ludwigshafen–Saarbrücken; Neustadt–Monsheim; Neustadt–Wissembourg		
Neuwied	NR	VRM; VRS	3			x	x		Köln–Wiesbaden		
Nieder Flörsheim-Dalsheim	AZ	VRN	6			x	x		Worms–Bingen		
Nieder Olm	MZ	RNN	6			x	x		Alzey–Mainz		
Niederdreisbach	AK	VRM, VRS					x		Betzdorf–Daaden	Owner: WEG	
Niedererbach	WW	VRM	7				x		Limburg–Siershahn		
Niederheimbach	MZ	RNN	6				x		Köln–Mainz		
Niederhövels	AK	VRM, VRS, Westfalentarif	6				x		Köln–Siegen		
Niederlahnstein	EMS	VRM	4			x	x		Köln–Wiesbaden; Wetzlar–Koblenz		
Niedermohr	KL	VRN	6				x		Landstuhl–Kusel		
Niederschelden	AK	VRM, VRS, Westfalentarif	5				x		Köln–Siegen		
Nierstein	MZ	RNN	5				x		Mainz–Ludwigshafen		
Nievern	EMS	VRM	6				x		Wetzlar–Koblenz		
Nistertal-Bad Marienberg	WW	VRM	6				x		Limburg–Altenkirchen		
Nittel	TR	VRT	6				x		Trier–Metz		
Nohen	BIR	RNN	6				x		Bingen–Saarbrücken		
Norheim	KH	RNN	6				x		Bingen–Saarbrücken		
Oberbettingen-Hillesheim	DAU	VRT; VRS	6			x	x		Köln–Trier		
Oberbillig	TR	VRT	6				x		Trier–Metz		
Obererbach	AK	VRM, VRS	7				x		Limburg–Altenkirchen		
Oberlahnstein	EMS	VRM	5			x	x		Köln–Wiesbaden		
Obermohr	KL	VRN	6				x		Landstuhl–Kusel		
Obernhof (Lahn)	EMS	VRM	6				x		Wetzlar–Koblenz		
Oberwesel	SIM	VRM	5				x		Köln–Mainz		
Oberwinter	AW	VRM	5			x	x		Köln–Mainz		
Ockenheim	MZ	RNN	6				x		Gau Algesheim–Bad Kreuznach		
Olsbrücken	KL	VRN	6				x		Kaiserslautern–Lauterecken-Grumbach		
Oppenheim	MZ	RNN	5				x		Mainz–Ludwigshafen		
Osterspai	EMS	VRM	6			x	x		Köln–Wiesbaden		
Osthofen	AZ	VRN	4				x		Mainz–Ludwigshafen		
Palzem	TR	VRT	6				x		Trier–Metz		
Pfalzel	TR	VRT	5				x		Koblenz–Trier; Köln–Trier		
Pfeddersheim	AZ	VRN	6			x	x		Worms–Bingen		
Philippsheim	BIT	VRT	6				x		Köln–Trier		
Pirmasens Hbf	PS	VRN	5				x		Kaiserslautern–Pirmasens		
Pirmasens Nord	PS	VRN	4				x		Kaiserslautern–Pirmasens; Landau–Pirmasens; Pirmasens–Rohrbach		
Plaidt	MYK	VRM	6				x		Andernach–Gerolstein		
Pommern (Mosel)	COC	VRM	6				x		Koblenz–Trier		
Quint	TR	VRT	6				x		Koblenz–Trier		
Rammelsbach	KUS	VRN	7				x		Landstuhl–Kusel		
Ramsen	KIB	VRN	7				x		Grünstadt–Enkenbach		
Ramstein	KL	VRN	5				x		Landstuhl–Kusel		
Rech	AW	VRM	6				x		Remagen–Adenau		
Reckweilerhof	KUS	VRN	7				x		Kaiserslautern–Lauterecken-Grumbach		
Rehweiler	KUS	VRN	7				x		Landstuhl–Kusel		
Reil DB	WIL	VRT	7				x		Bullay–Traben-Trarbach		
Remagen	AW	VRM	3		x	x	x		Köln–Mainz; Remagen–Adenau		
Rheinbrohl	NR	VRM; VRS	5				x		Köln–Wiesbaden		
Rheinzabern	GER	VRN; KVV	6				x		Schifferstadt–Wörth		
Rhens	MYK	VRM	6				x		Köln–Mainz		
Rieschweiler	PS	VRN	7				x		Pirmasens–Rohrbach		
Rinnthal	SÜW	VRN; KVV	7				x		Landau–Pirmasens		
Rockenhausen	KIB	VRN	5				x		Kaiserslautern–Bad Münster		
Rodalben	PS	VRN	6				x		Landau–Pirmasens		
Rohrbach (Pfalz)	SÜW	VRN; KVV	6				x		Neustadt–Wissembourg		
Rolandseck	AW	VRM	5				x		Köln–Mainz		
Rossbach (Pfalz)	KUS	VRN	6				x		Kaiserslautern–Lauterecken-Grumbach		
Rotenhain	WW	VRM	6				x		Limburg–Altenkirchen		
Rülzheim	GER	VRN; KVV	6				x		Schifferstadt–Wörth		
Saarburg (Bz Trier)	TR	VRT	4			x	x		Saarbrücken–Trier		
Salmtal	WIL	VRT	6				x		Koblenz–Trier		
Sassenroth	AK	VRM, VRS	7				x		Betzdorf–Dillenburg	Request stop	
Saulheim	AZ	RNN	6			x	x		Alzey–Mainz		
Schaidt	GER	VRN; KVV	7				x		Neustadt–Wissembourg		
Scheuerfeld (Sieg)	AK	VRM, VRS, Westfalentarif	5				x		Köln–Siegen		
Schifferstadt	RP	VRN	3			x	x	x	Mannheim–Saarbrücken; Schifferstadt–Wörth		
Schifferstadt Süd	RP	VRN	5				x	x	Schifferstadt–Wörth		
Schoden-Ockfen	TR	VRT	6				x		Saarbrücken–Trier		
Schopp	KL	VRN	6				x		Kaiserslautern–Pirmasens		
Schutzbach	AK	VRM, VRS					x		Betzdorf–Daaden	Owner: WEG	
Schweich DB	TR	VRT	5				x		Koblenz–Trier		
Schweighofen	SÜW	VRN; KVV	7				x		Neustadt–Wissembourg		
Sehlem (Kr Wittlich)	WIL	VRT	6				x		Koblenz–Trier		
Serrig	TR	VRT	6				x		Saarbrücken–Trier		
Siebeldingen-Birkweiler	SÜW	VRN; KVV	7				x		Landau–Pirmasens		
Siershahn	WW	VRM	6				x		Limburg–Siershahn		
Sinzig (Rhein)	AW	VRM	4			x	x		Köln–Mainz		
Sondernheim	GER	VRN; KVV	6				x		Schifferstadt–Wörth		
Spay	MYK	VRM	6				x		Köln–Mainz		
Speicher	BIT	VRT	6			x	x		Köln–Trier		
Speyer Hbf	RP	VRN	4			x	x	x	Schifferstadt–Wörth		
Speyer Nord-West	SP	VRN	6				x	x	Schifferstadt–Wörth		
Sprendlingen (Rheinhess)	MZ	RNN	6				x		Worms–Bingen		
St. Goar	SIM	VRM	5				x		Köln–Mainz		
St. Goarshausen	EMS	VRM	6			x	x		Köln–Wiesbaden		
St. Thomas	BIT	VRT	6				x		Köln–Trier		
Staudernheim	KH	RNN	5			x	x		Bingen–Saarbrücken		
Steinalben	PS	VRN	7				x		Kaiserslautern–Pirmasens		
Steinefrenz	WW	VRM	6				x		Limburg–Siershahn		
Steinfeld (Pfalz)	SÜW	VRN; KVV	7				x		Neustadt–Wissembourg		
Steinweiler	GER	VRN; KVV	6				x		Neustadt–Wissembourg		
Steinwenden	KL	VRN	6				x		Landstuhl–Kusel		
Taben	TR	VRT	6				x		Saarbrücken–Trier		
Temmels	TR	VRT	6				x		Trier–Metz		
Thaleischweiler-Fröschen	PS	VRN	6				x		Pirmasens–Rohrbach		
Theisbergstegen	KUS	VRN	7				x		Landstuhl–Kusel		
Thür	MYK	VRM	7				x		Andernach–Gerolstein		
Traben-Trarbach DB	WIL	VRT	7				x		Bullay–Traben-Trarbach		
Trechtingshausen	MZ	RNN	6				x		Köln–Mainz		
Treis-Karden	COC	VRM	5			x	x		Koblenz–Trier		
Trier Hbf	TR	VRT	2	x	x	x	x		Koblenz–Trier; Köln–Trier; Luxemburg–Trier; Saarbrücken–Trier; Trier–Metz		
Trier Süd	TR	VRT	5			x	x		Luxemburg–Trier; Saarbrücken–Trier; Trier–Metz		
Uhlerborn	MZ	RNN	6				x		Köln–Mainz		
Unkel	NR	VRM; VRS	5			x	x		Köln–Wiesbaden		
Unnau-Korb	WW	VRM	7				x		Limburg–Altenkirchen		
Untersulzbach	KL	VRN	6				x		Kaiserslautern–Lauterecken-Grumbach		
Urmersbach	COC	VRM	7				x		Andernach–Gerolstein		
Urmitz	MYK	VRM	6				x		Köln–Mainz		
Urmitz Rheinbrücke	AW	VRM	6				x		Neuwied–Koblenz		
Ürzig DB	WIL	VRT	6				x		Koblenz–Trier		
Usch-Zendscheid	BIT	VRT	7				x		Köln–Trier		
Vallendar	MYK	VRM	6			x			Köln–Wiesbaden		
Vogelweh	KL	VRN	6				x	x	Mannheim–Saarbrücken		
Wachenheim (Pfalz)	DÜW	VRN	6				x		Neustadt–Monsheim		
Wachenheim-Mölsheim	KIB	VRN				x			Langmeil–Monsheim	Only Sat & Sun; Owner: DTV	
Waggonfabrik	MZ	RNN; RMV	6				x		Alzey–Mainz		
Wahlheim (Kr Alzey)	AZ	VRN				x	x		Alzey–Marnheim	Owner: RPE	
Waldfischbach	PS	VRN	6				x		Kaiserslautern–Pirmasens		
Wallertheim	AZ	RNN	7				x		Worms–Bingen		
Walporzheim	AW	VRM	6				x		Remagen–Adenau		
Wasserliesch	TR	VRT	6				x		Trier–Metz		
Wehr (Mosel)	TR	VRT	7				x		Trier–Metz		
Weidenthal	DÜW	VRN	5			x	x	x	Mannheim–Saarbrücken		
Weisenheim (Sand)	DÜW	VRN	6				x		Freinsheim–Frankenthal		
Weissenthurm	MYK	VRM	5				x		Köln–Mainz		
Welgesheim-Zotzenheim	MZ	RNN	6				x		Worms–Bingen		
Wellen (Mosel)	TR	VRT	6				x		Trier–Metz		
Westerburg	WW	VRM	6				x		Limburg–Altenkirchen		
Wilgartswiesen	PS	VRN	6				x		Landau–Pirmasens		
Willmenrod	WW	VRM	7				x		Limburg–Altenkirchen		
Wiltingen (Saar)	TR	VRT	6				x		Saarbrücken–Trier		
Wincheringen	TR	VRT	6				x		Trier–Metz		
Winden (Pfalz)	GER	VRN; KVV	4			x	x		Neustadt–Wissembourg; Winden–Bad Bergzabern; Winden–Karlsruhe		
Winningen	MYK	VRM	6				x		Koblenz–Trier		
Winnweiler	KIB	VRN	6				x		Kaiserslautern–Bad Münster		
Wirges	WW	VRM	7				x		Limburg–Siershahn		
Wissen (Sieg)	AK	VRM, VRS, Westfalentarif	5			x	x		Köln–Siegen		
Wittlich Hbf	WIL	VRT	4	x	x	x	x		Koblenz–Trier		
Wolfstein	KUS	VRN	6				x		Kaiserslautern–Lauterecken-Grumbach		
Worms Brücke	WO	VRN	6				x		Worms–Bensheim		
Worms Hbf	WO	VRN	2	x	x	x	x		Mainz–Ludwigshafen; Worms–Bensheim; Worms–Biblis; Worms–Bingen		
Wörrstadt	AZ	RNN	6			x	x		Alzey–Mainz		
Wörth (Rhein)	GER	VRN; KVV	4			x	x	x	Schifferstadt–Wörth; Winden–Karlsruhe; Wörth–Lauterbourg		
Zweibrücken Hbf	ZW	VRN	5				x		Pirmasens–Rohrbach		

== See also ==
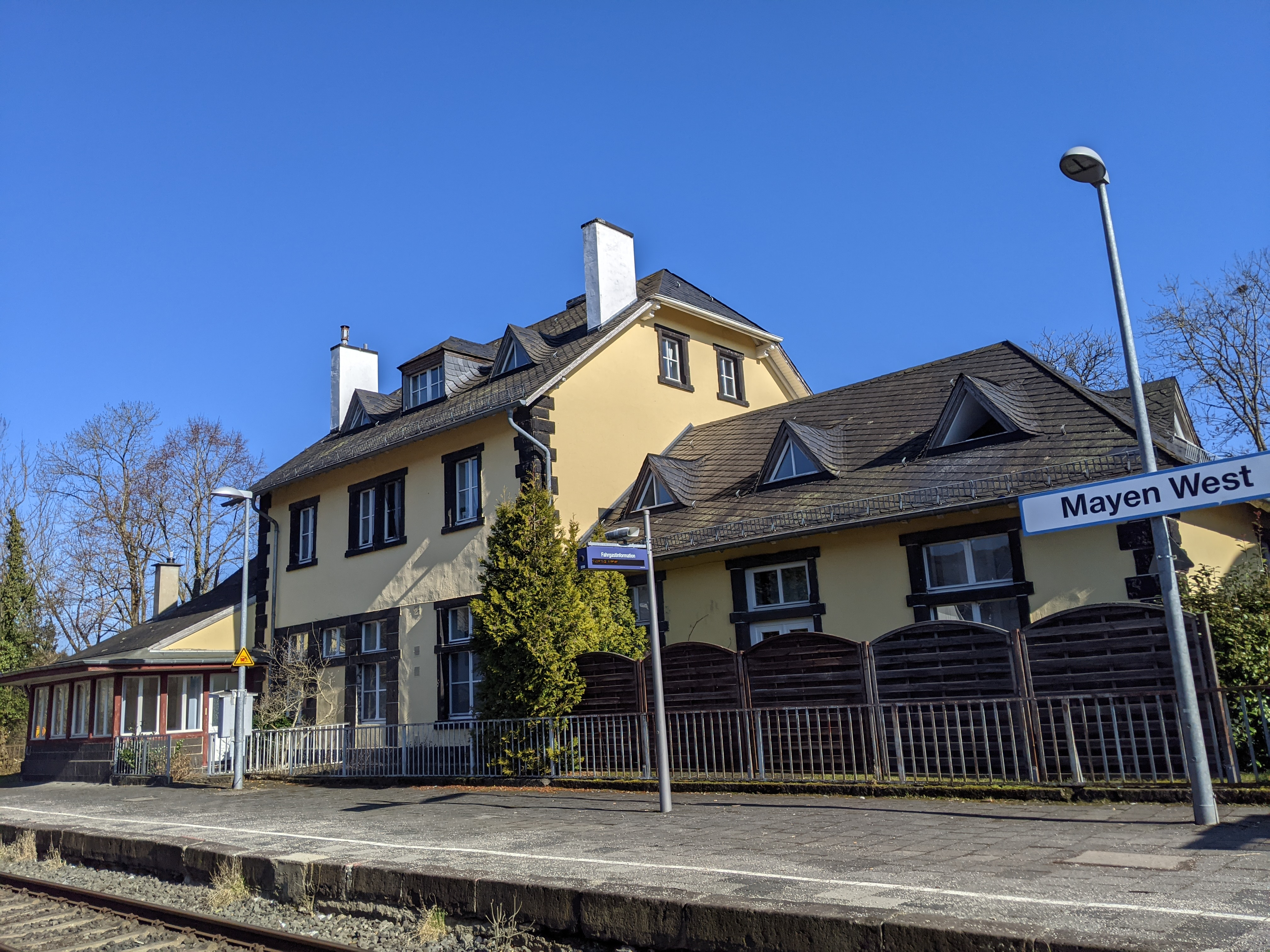
Mayen West at the Cross Eifel Railway

- German railway station categories
- Railway station types of Germany
- List of scheduled railway routes in Germany

== Notes ==
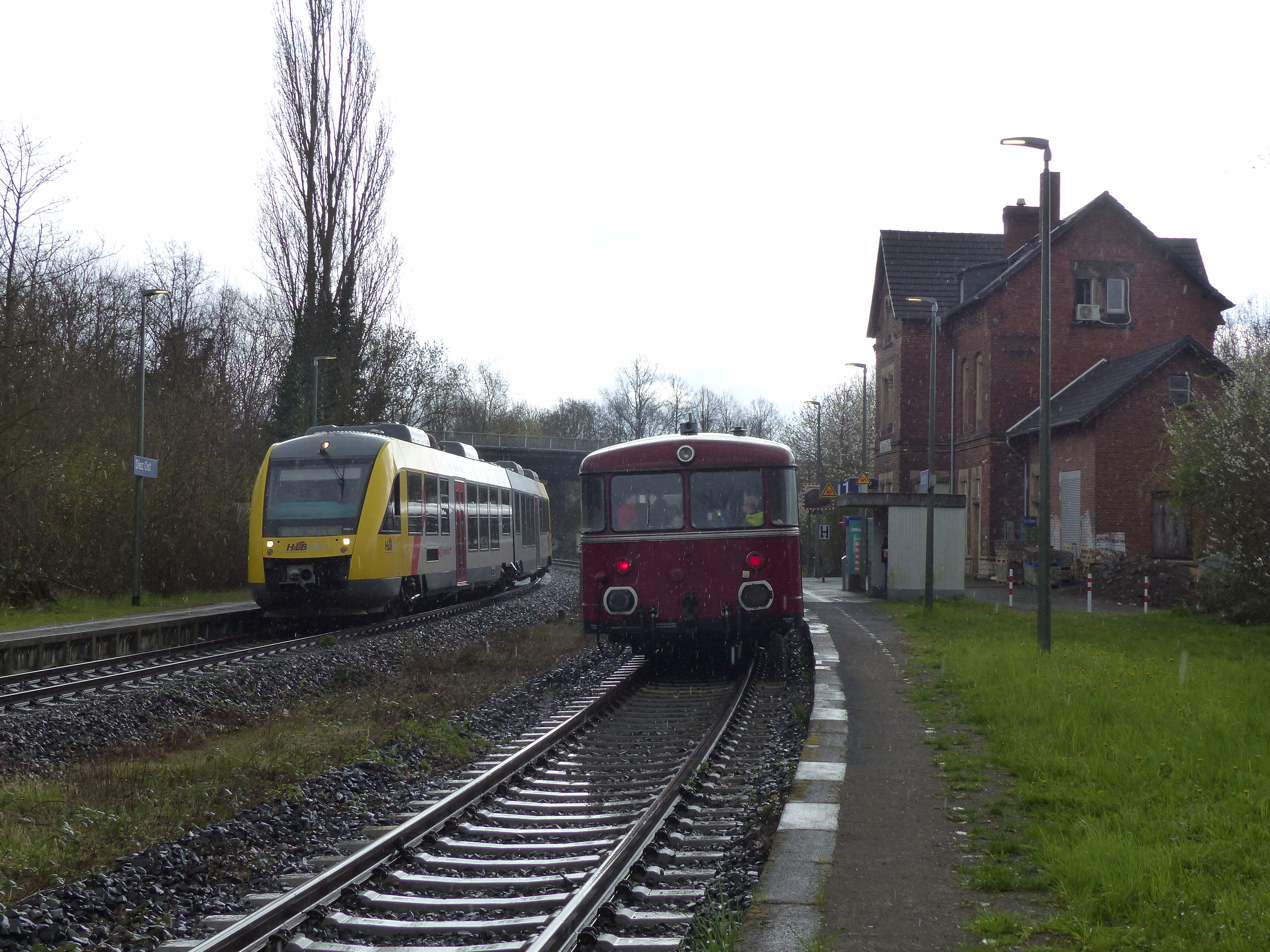
Diez Ost
