= Duw =

Duw or DUW may be:

- DUW, the name of a series of watches by German company Nomos Glashütte
- duw, the ISO 639-3 code of the Dusun Witu language of Indonesia
- DÜW, the station code for train station Landkreis Bad Dürkheim, Bad Dürkheim, Rhineland-Palatinate, Germany; see List of railway stations in Rhineland-Palatinate

== See also ==
- Dół ( pronounced as: [ˈduw] ), Gmina Iława, Iława, Warmian-Masurian, Poland
- Douw (disambiguation)
- Dow (disambiguation)
