= Apach =

- Commune
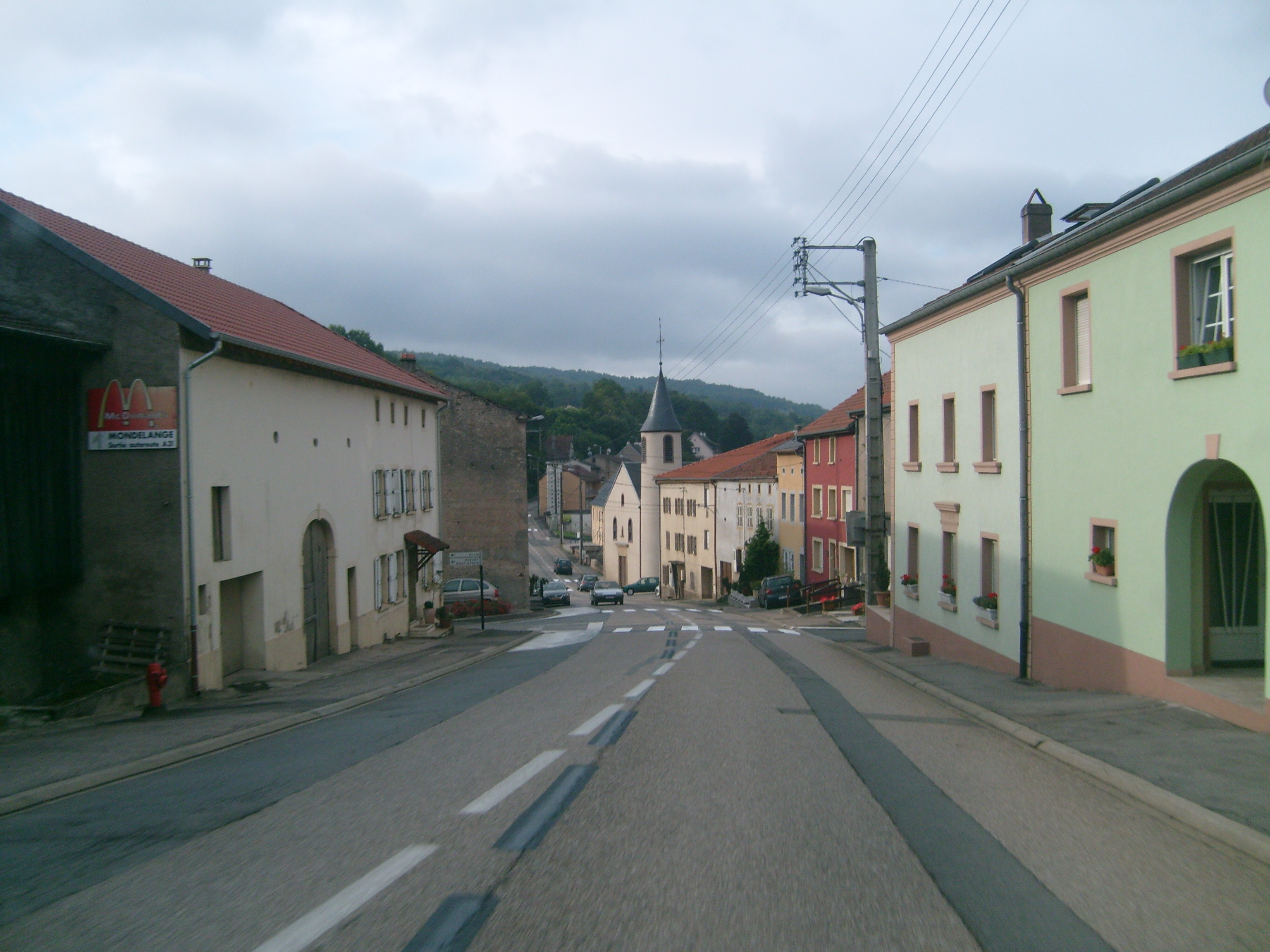
- A view within Apach

- Coat of arms
- Location of Apach
- Location within France Location within Grand Est
- Coordinates: 49°27′34″N 6°22′32″E
- Country: France
- Region: Grand Est
- Department: Moselle
- Arrondissement: Thionville
- Canton: Bouzonville

Government
  - Mayor (2020–2026): Emilie Feltz-Villain
- Area^{1}: 3.35 km^{2} (1.29 sq mi)
- Elevation: 115 m (377 ft)
- Highest elevation: 365 m (1,198 ft)
- Lowest elevation: 145 m (476 ft)
- Population (2023): 1,072
  - Density: 320/km^{2} (829/sq mi)
- Time zone: UTC+01:00 (CET)
  - Summer (DST): UTC+02:00 (CEST)
- INSEE/Postal code: 57026 /57480
- ^{1} French Land Register data, which excludes lakes, ponds, glaciers > 1 km^{2} (0.386 sq mi or 247 acres) and river estuaries.

Apach (French pronunciation: [apak]; German: Apach; Luxembourgish: Opech [ˈoːpəɕ]) is a commune in the Moselle department in Grand Est in northeastern France.

Apach is 2 km (1.2 mi) from Sierck-les-Bains, 25 km (16 mi) from Thionville, and 50 km (31 mi) from Metz. It is on the right bank of the river Moselle, on the border of Germany and Luxembourg, the municipalities just across the border being Perl in Germany and Schengen in Luxembourg. It has a station on the Thionville–Trier railway, served by regional trains.

Apach was the scene of a skirmish between the French and German armies during the Saar Offensive of 1939.

A natural reserve for orchids is located along the limestone hillsides, of which there are many in this town.

== Population ==
Historical population
| Year | Pop. | ±% p.a. |
|---|---|---|
| 1968 | 841 | — |
| 1975 | 848 | +0.12% |
| 1982 | 864 | +0.27% |
| 1990 | 798 | −0.99% |
| 1999 | 813 | +0.21% |
| 2007 | 943 | +1.87% |
| 2012 | 1,004 | +1.26% |
| 2017 | 1,032 | +0.55% |
| 2023 | 1,072 | +0.64% |
Source: INSEE

== See also ==
- Communes of the Moselle department
