= Regio Infra Service Sachsen =

German railway company

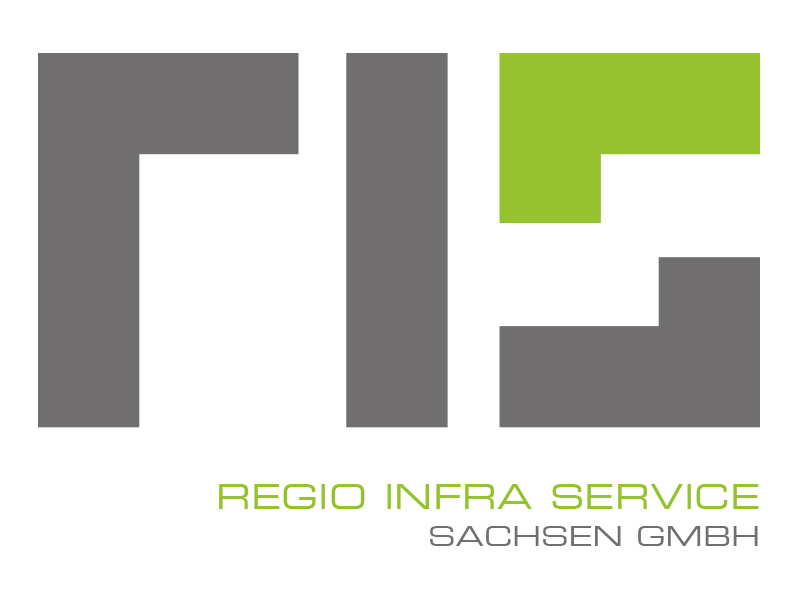
Logo of Regio Infra Service Sachsen

Regio Infra Service Sachsen GmbH (RISS) is a railway infrastructure manager and a railway company (EVU) founded in 2001. The shareholders are Chemnitzer Verkehrs AG (CVAG) and RP-Eisenbahn GmbH (RPE). The company is based in Chemnitz, Saxony, Germany.

== History ==
Former logo of Regio Infra Service Sachsen

Regio Infra Service Sachsen was founded on 5 July 2001 as a railway infrastructure company (EIU) for the Chemnitz Model.

The connection between Chemnitz and Stollberg had already been planned in advance as a pilot line according to this concept. Already on December 15, 2002, the scheduled electric train service with Regio light rail vehicles of the City-Bahn Chemnitz could be started there. Further lines in the Chemnitz area were simultaneously prepared for preliminary operation with diesel railcars.

A special feature of the RISS network is the Freiberg-Nossen line (Zellwaldbahn). This line is currently only used for freight traffic and for special trips with historical trains. A resumption of local rail passenger transport is not planned there.

The Neuoelsnitz–Lugau railway line, which was closed to traffic in 2010 and operationally closed in 2015, was put out to tender by RISS for sale to third parties in July 2017. The investments for the recommissioning of the line were estimated at a total of 380,000 euros. As no other EIU took over the line, it was closed down and subsequently de-dedicated.

== Network ==
- Stollberg–St. Egidien (since February 2002) (19,4 km)
- Hainichen–Niederwiesa (since October 2002) (17,115 km)
- Stollberg–Chemnitz Süd (since September 2002) (21,1 km)
- Nossen–Freiberg (since November 2005) (24,000 km)
- Zwotental–Adorf (Vogtl) (since January 2018) (11,514 km)

=== Further network ===
- Neuoelsnitz–Lugau (until 2017)
