= Alsenz station =

Railway station in Alsenz, Germany

Alsenz
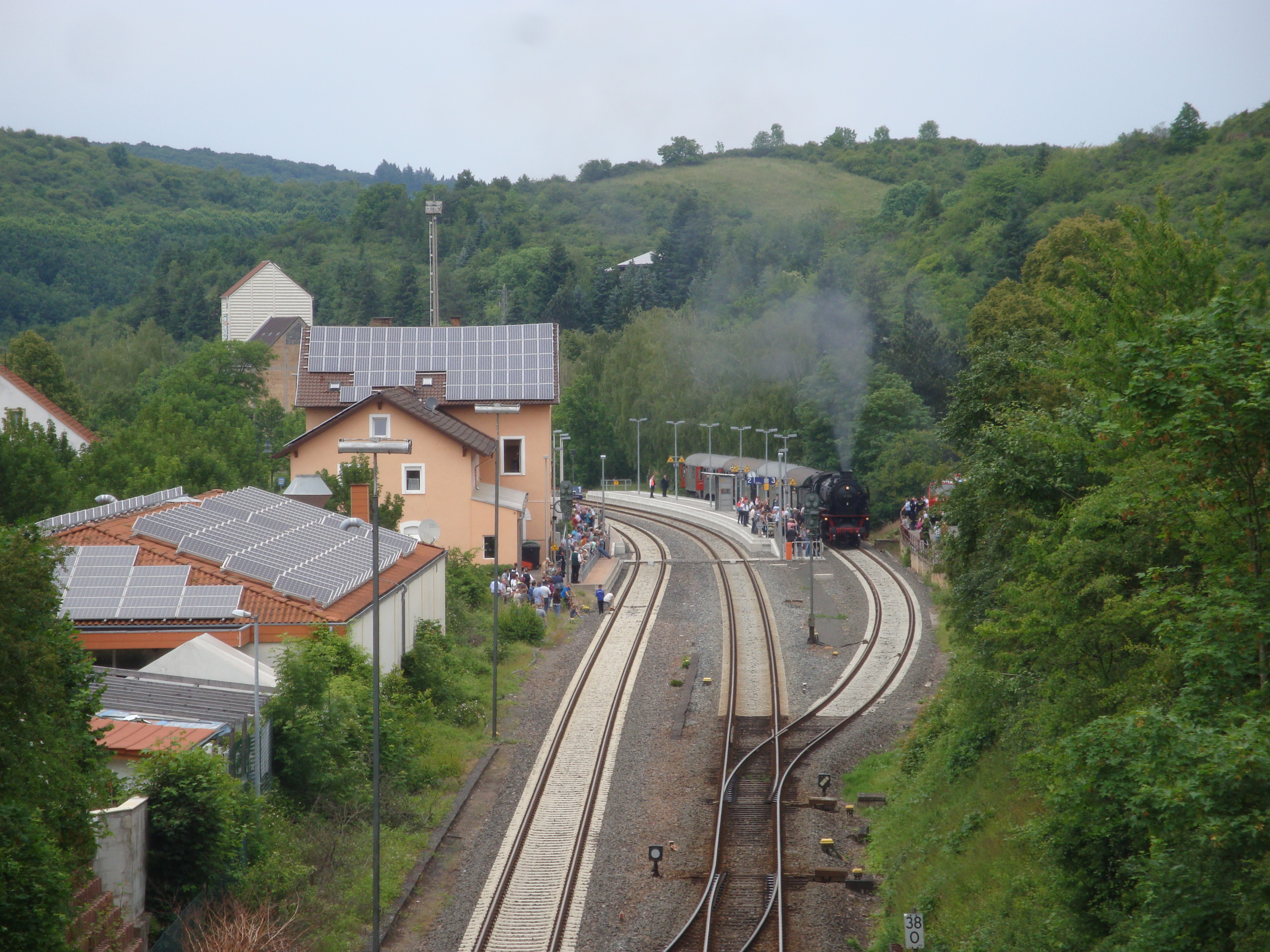
- Alsenz station during a steam event in 2014

General information
- Location: Bahnhofstr. 1, Alsenz, Rhineland-Palatinate; Germany
- Coordinates: 49°43′41″N 7°49′02″E
- Lines: Hochspeyer–Bad Münster (km 38.2) (KBS 672); Alsenz–Obermoschel (km 0.0) (closed)
- Platforms: 3

Construction
- Accessible: Yes

Other information
- Station code: 64
- DS100 code: SAZ
- IBNR: 8000505
- Category: 6
- Fare zone: VRN: 861
- Website: www.bahnhof.de

History
- Opened: 16 May 1871

Services
Preceding station	DB Regio Mitte	Following station
Rockenhausen towards Kaiserslautern Hbf	RB 65	Hochstätten (Pfalz) towards Bingen Hbf
Location
- Location within Rhineland-Palatinate Location within Germany Location within Europe

Alsenz station is the station of the town of Alsenz in the German state of Rhineland-Palatinate. Deutsche Bahn classifies it as a category 6 station and it has two platforms. Its address is Bahnhofstraße 1.

It is located on the Alsenz Valley Railway (Alsenztalbahn, Hochspeyer–Bad Münster) and was opened on 16 May 1871 with the section from Winnweiler to Bad Münster. In 1903, the station became the starting point of a narrow gauge branch line to Obermoschel, which was closed in 1935.

== Location ==
The station is located within the northeastern built-up area of the community of Alsenz. The local Bahnhofstraße (station street) runs to its west.

== History ==
The first campaign for a railway connection to the Alsenz valley (Alsenztal) started around 1860. This would have above all created a shorter north-south route for transit traffic that had up to that point been carried through Mainz. After the Hochspeyer–Winnweiler section had already been opened in November 1870, the gap to Bad Münster was closed six months later on 16 May 1871. As a result, the municipality of Alsenz, which is located on this section, also received a station.

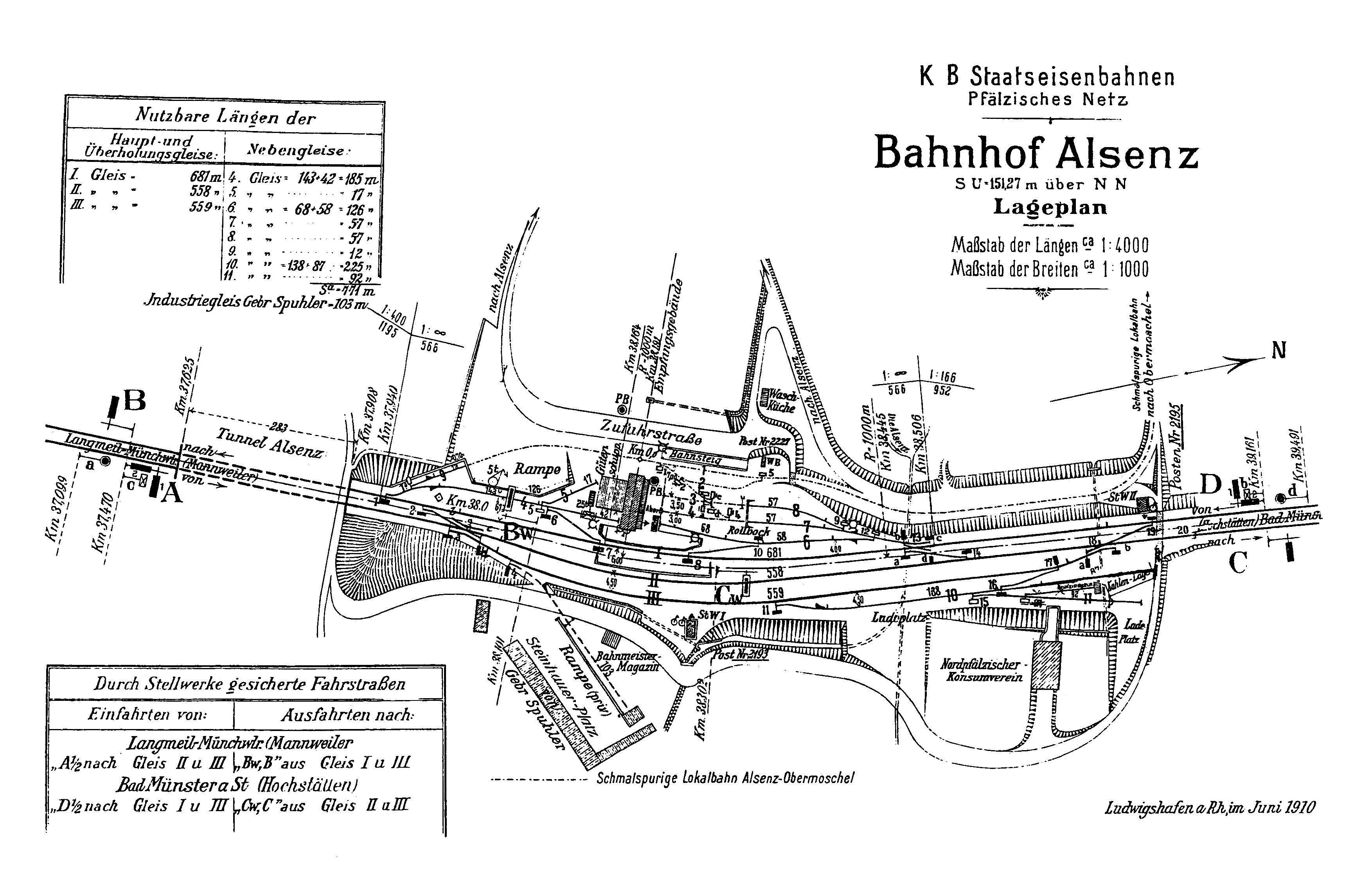
Track plan of Alsenz station about 1910

In order to join the nearby town of Obermoschel to the railway network, a narrow-gauge railway was built to Alsenz, which opened was on 1 October 1903; thus Alsenz became an interchange station. In 1922, the station was integrated into the new Reichsbahndirektion Ludwigshafen (railway division of Ludwigshafen). Since the line to Obermoschel was poorly loaded, it was closed in 1935. During the dissolution of the railway division of Ludwigshafen, on 1 April 1937, control of the station was transferred to the railway division of Mainz.

After the Second World War, the newly founded Deutsche Bundesbahn (DB) transferred the station to the Bundesbahndirektion Mainz (Bundesbahn railway division of Mainz), which was assigned all railway lines within the newly created state of Rhineland-Palatinate. As early as 1971, it became a part of the railway division of Saarbrücken with the dissolution of the railway division of Mainz. In 2000, the station, like all stations in the Western Palatinate, became part of the Westpfalz-Verkehrsverbund (Western Palatinate transport association, WVV) at its foundation, but the WVV was absorbed into the Verkehrsverbund Rhein-Neckar (Rhine-Neckar transport association, VRN) six years later.

== Infrastructure ==
Standard gauge section

The station has two through tracks and a passing track for passenger services. The "house" platforms next to the entrance building and the island platform was modernised in 2011. On the eastern side of the station there is still a piece of the former loading track for the agricultural trade (formerly Nordpfälzer Konsumverein—Northern Palatine Consumer Cooperative).

At the time of its greatest extent, the station had a total of 11 tracks. One of them, track 9 according to the plan of 1910, could also be used to load narrow-gauge vehicles from vehicles on the standard-gauge track. On the eastern side of the station, there was also the private siding of the stonemasonry company, Spuhler.

Platforms
Platform	Usable length	Platform height	Current use
1	177 m	55 cm	Regionalbahn services towards Kaiserslautern
2	120 m	55 cm	Regionalbahn services towards Bingen
3	120 m	55 cm	No regular use

Two signal boxes were available for the control and monitoring of the station tracks and signals. Signal box I was located at the entrance building in the eastern side of the station. Signal box II was located at the northern end of the station and also operated the level crossing barriers next to it. Both buildings no longer exist.

Narrow gauge section

The two-tracked narrow-gauge station on the street-side of the station was in the forecourt of the station building. Several shunting tracks for freight traffic were connected to this on the north-west side of the station. Two of these tracks were equipped with rollbock pits, allowing the standard-gauge wagons to be loaded on narrow-gauge transporters. With the end of the narrow-gauge operations in 1935, these tracks were dismantled.

== Entrance building ==
The entrance building is similar to all the stations built in the Palatinate in the 1860s and 1870s. It is no longer used for railway operations.
