= Alzey–Mainz railway =

Railway line in Germany

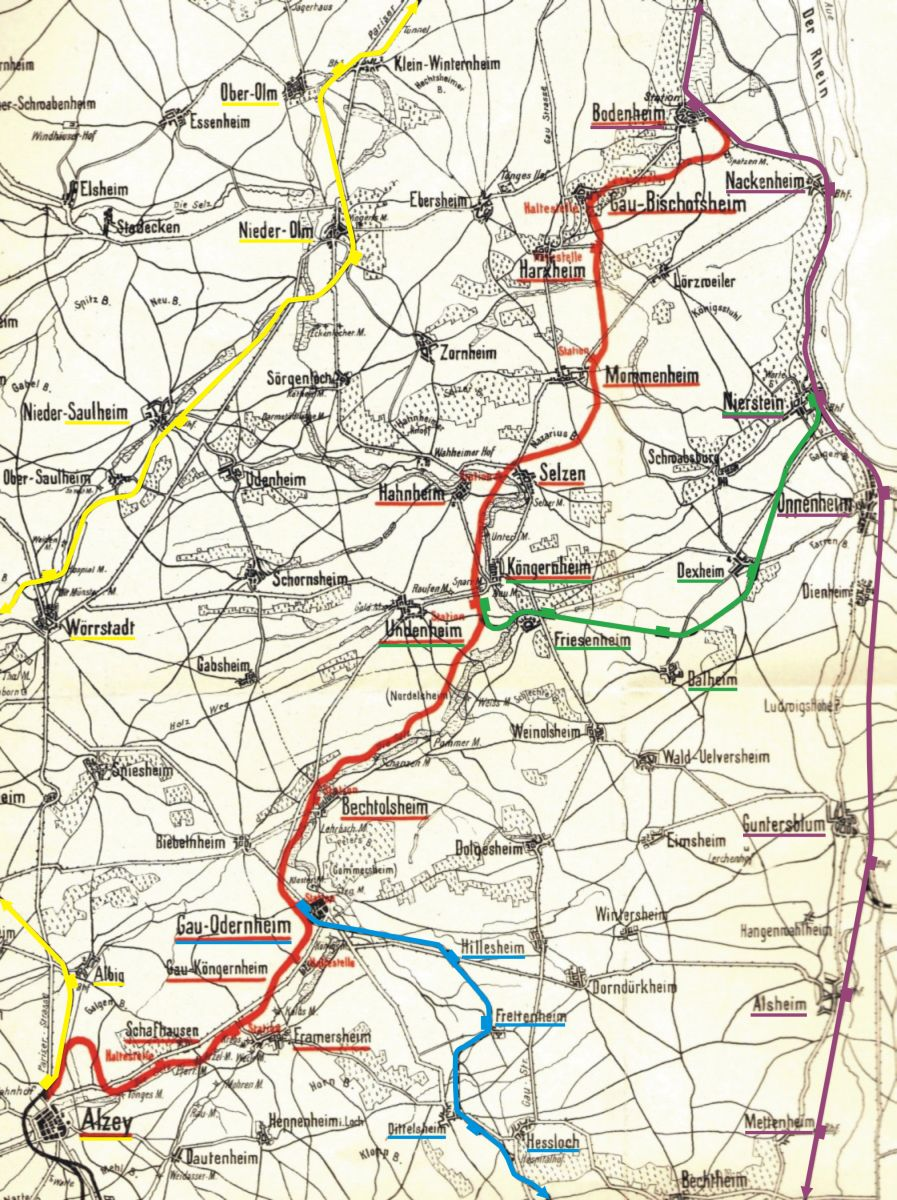

Overview
- Line number: 3523
- Locale: Rhineland-Palatinate, Germany

Service
- Route number: 661

Technical
- Line length: 41.1 km (25.5 mi)
- Track gauge: 1,435 mm (4 ft 8 1/2 in) standard gauge

The Alzey–Mainz railway was opened on 18 December 1871 by the Hessian Ludwig Railway (German: Hessische Ludwigsbahn), linking the two cities of Alzey and Mainz in the German state of Rhineland-Palatinate to each other.

== Route ==
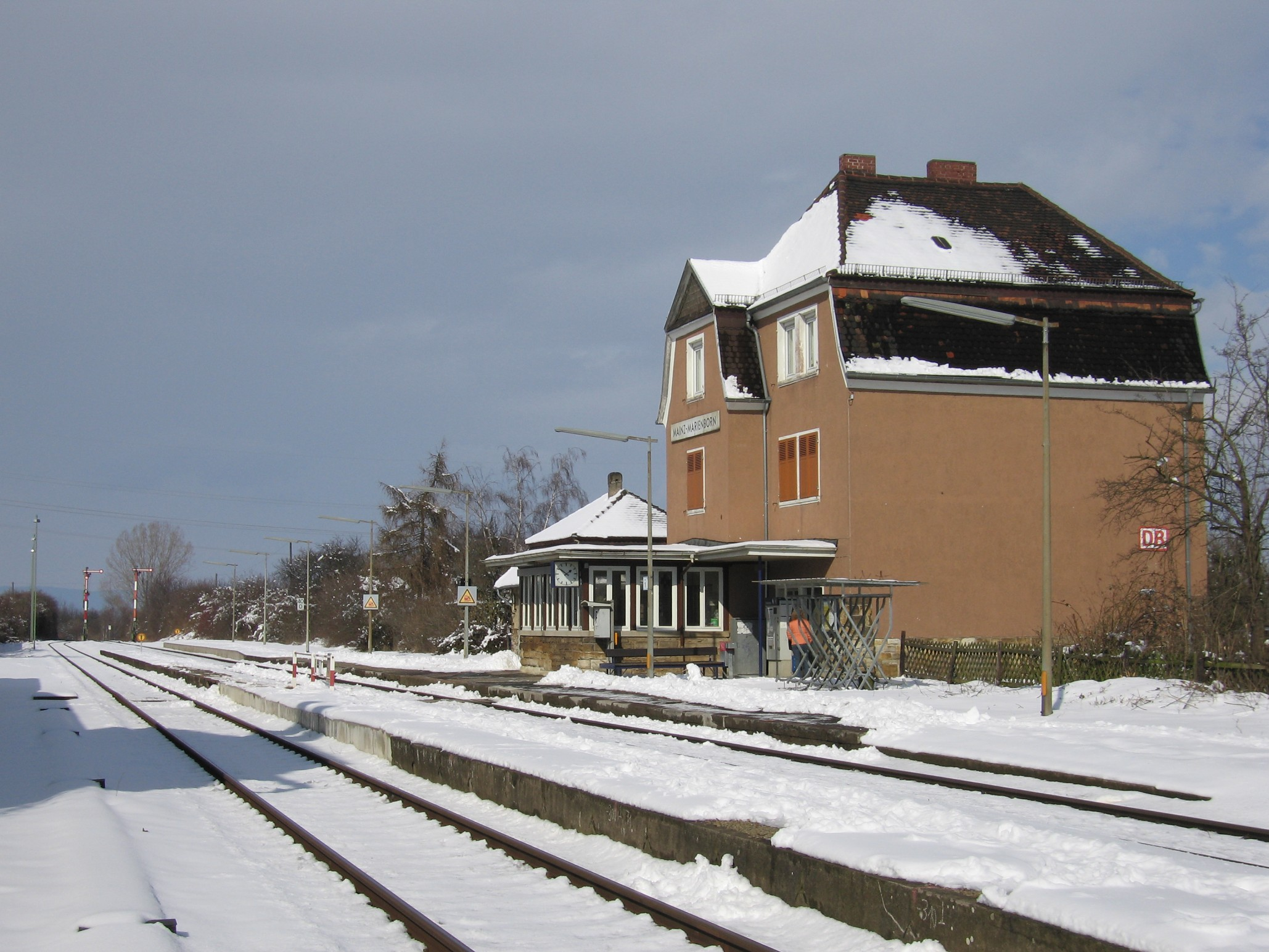
Mainz-Marienborn station in the winter

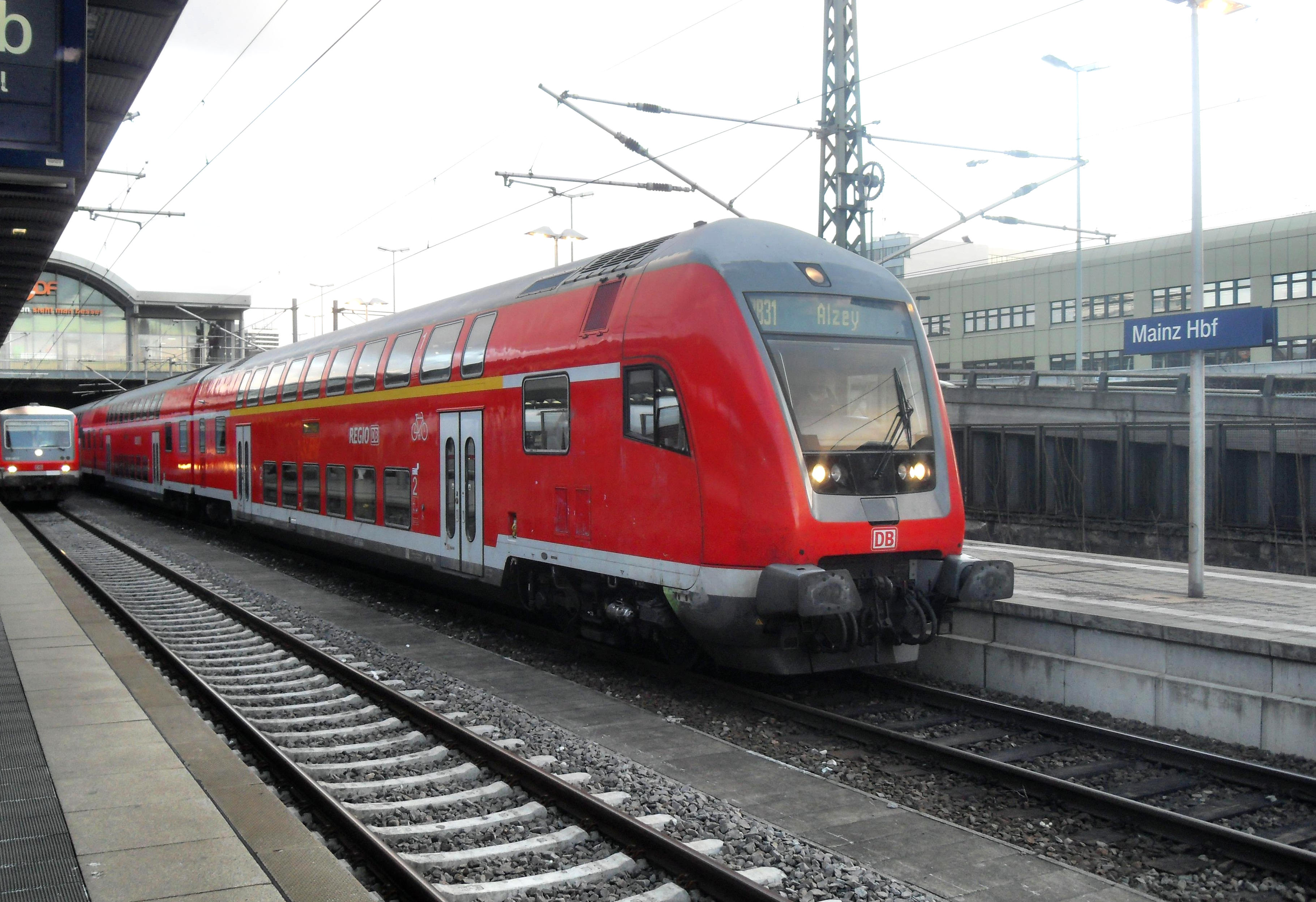
Regionalbahn service in Mainz Hauptbahnhof on its way towards Alzey (2009)

The non-electrified line is operated by Regionalbahn service RB 31 and Regional-Express line RE 13.

It connects at Alzey with services on the Donnersberg Railway (Donnersbergbahn), operating as RB 47. The section between Alzey and Armsheim is also used by services on the Rheinhessen Railway from Bingen to Worms.

As the line from Armsheim to Mainz is single-track only, services can be operated at most every half-hour, with oncoming trains forced to wait in stations, usually in Saulheim and Mainz-Marienborn (RB) or Mainz-Gonsenheim (RE).

== Rail services ==
The line is now served by Regionalbahn service RB 31 and Regional-Express service RE 13. Until the timetable change in December 2014, the line was operated by DB Regio, after which vlexx GmbH took over the service from Mainz to Kirchheimbolanden. The company had won the tender for the passenger operations.

The Elsass-Express (Alsace Express) to Wissembourg uses this part of the line on weekends and on public holidays.

== Rolling stock ==
=== DB Regio ===
The track is served by both trains consisting of class 218 diesel locomotives hauling three double-decker carriages and by class 628 diesel multiple units, sometimes in coupled sets. In fact, class 629, a variation of class 628, was specially built for the very steeply graded line.

=== vlexx ===
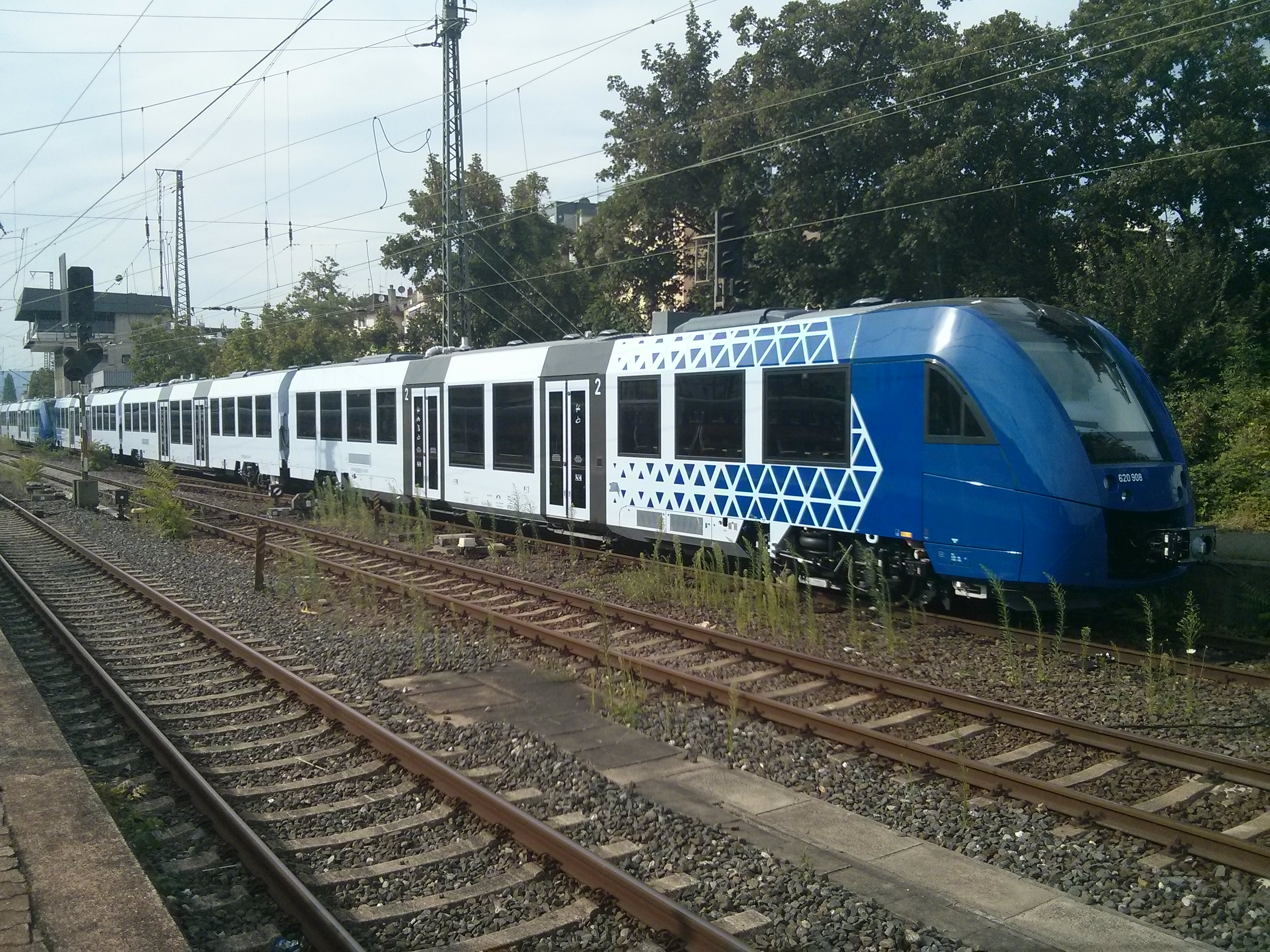
LINT 81 diesel multiple unit during trials in Mainz, July 2014

vlexx GmbH has operated Alstom Coradia LINT diesel multiple units since December 2014. Services are operated with LINT 54 as two-part diesel railcars with 162 seats or three-part diesel railcars with 264 seats.
