= Alzey station =

Railway station in Alzey, Germany

Alzey
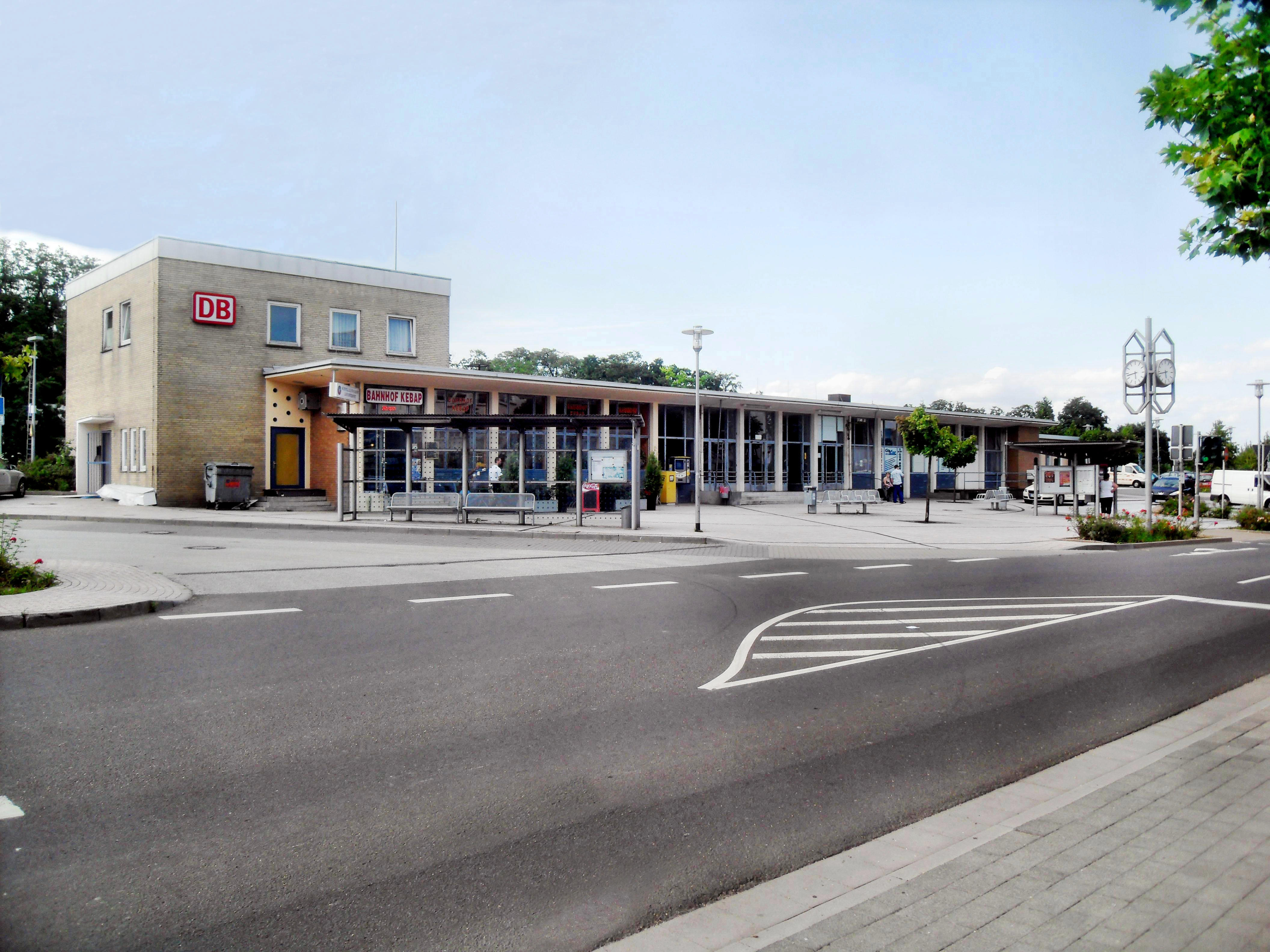

General information
- Location: Bahnhofstr. 30, Alzey, Rhineland-Palatinate; Germany
- Coordinates: 49°45′00″N 8°06′36″E
- Lines: Alzey–Mainz (9.0 km) (KBS 661); Rheinhessen Railway (30.0 km) (KBS 662); Donnersberg Railway (9.0 km) (KBS 661.1); Bodenheim–Alzey (30.90 km) (KBS 661) (closed)
- Platforms: 3

Construction
- Accessible: Yes

Other information
- Station code: 1572
- DS100 code: FALZ
- IBNR: 8000005
- Category: 3
- Fare zone: VRN: 12; RNN: 350 (VRN transitional tariff); : 6830 (RNN transitional tariff)
- Website: www.bahnhof.de

History
- Opened: 1871; 155 years ago

Passengers
- 3500

Services
Preceding station	Vlexx	Following station
Alzey West towards Kirchheimbolanden	RE 13	Armsheim towards Mainz Hbf
Alzey West towards Kirchheimbolanden	RB 31	Albig towards Mainz Hbf
Preceding station	DB Regio Mitte	Following station
Albig towards Bingen Stadt	RB 35	Eppelsheim (Rheinhessen) towards Worms Hbf
Location
- Location within Rhineland-Palatinate

Alzey station is, along with the stations Alzey Süd and Alzey West, one of three stations in the urban area of the Rhenish Hesse (German: Rheinhessen) town of Alzey in the German state of Rhineland-Palatinate. It is classified by Deutsche Bahn as a category 3 station.

== History ==
The station was built in 1871 during the construction of the Alzey–Mainz railway and the Rheinhessen Railway by the Hessian Ludwig Railway (Hessische Ludwigsbahn, HLB). Three years later, the Donnersberg Railway was opened to Kirchheimbolanden. Most recently, the Bodenheim–Alzey railway was officially opened on 28 September 1896, but it was closed after almost 100 years.

The station building and the nearby freight yard were built from Flonheim sandstone. The station, as restored in the 1920s, had a waiting room for first and second class passengers and another for the third and fourth class. At noon on 19 October 1944, the station building was destroyed by an air raid. Until the late 1950s, a shed was used as a substitute before the new building was opened in 1960. Until then, passengers were allowed through the ticket gate only with a valid ticket or visitors with a platform ticket.

== Operations ==
Because of Alzey station’s location in the middle of Rhenish Hesse, it is connected to three operating lines:

- the Alzey-Mainz railway line runs from the northeast to Alzey station. Regionalbahn services run hourly from Mainz to Alzey and vice versa. The service is complemented by hourly Regional-Express trains. Thus, there is a half-hourly service from Alzey to Mainz, and vice versa.
- the Rheinhessenbahn service runs over the whole of the Rheinhessen Railway from Worms to Bingen (Rhein) Stadt station in the northwest of Rhenish Hesse. There is an hourly service in both directions. It always provides connections with regional trains at Alzey station.
- Partially reactivated in 1999, the Donnersberg Railway provides a connection from Alzey to the Palatinate. This also has hourly Regionalbahn services.
- Alzey is also served in the summer season from May until September by the Elsass-Express (Alsace-Express), which gives a direct connection to Wissembourg in France. It runs initially on the Rheinhessen Railway.
- Until the mid-1980s, Alzey station was also the beginning and the end of the Bodenheim–Alzey railway (known as the Amiche line).

The following is an overview of services at Alzey station (as of 2025):

Line	Route	Frequency
RE 13	(Frankfurt Hbf – Frankfurt Airport – Rüsselsheim –) Mainz –Alzey – Kirchheimbolanden	Hourly
RB 31	(Frankfurt Hbf –Frankfurt Airport – Rüsselsheim –) Mainz –Alzey – Kirchheimbolanden	Hourly
RB 35	Worms – Flörsheim-Dalsheim – Alzey – Armsheim – Gau-Bickelheim – Gensingen-Horrweiler – Bingen Stadt	Hourly

== Infrastructure ==
=== Entrance building ===
The entrance building is to the east of platforms 1 to 5. Located in the entrance building are the DB travel centre, a car rental and transportation service and a restaurant, which also operates a kiosk facing platform 1.

=== Passenger station ===
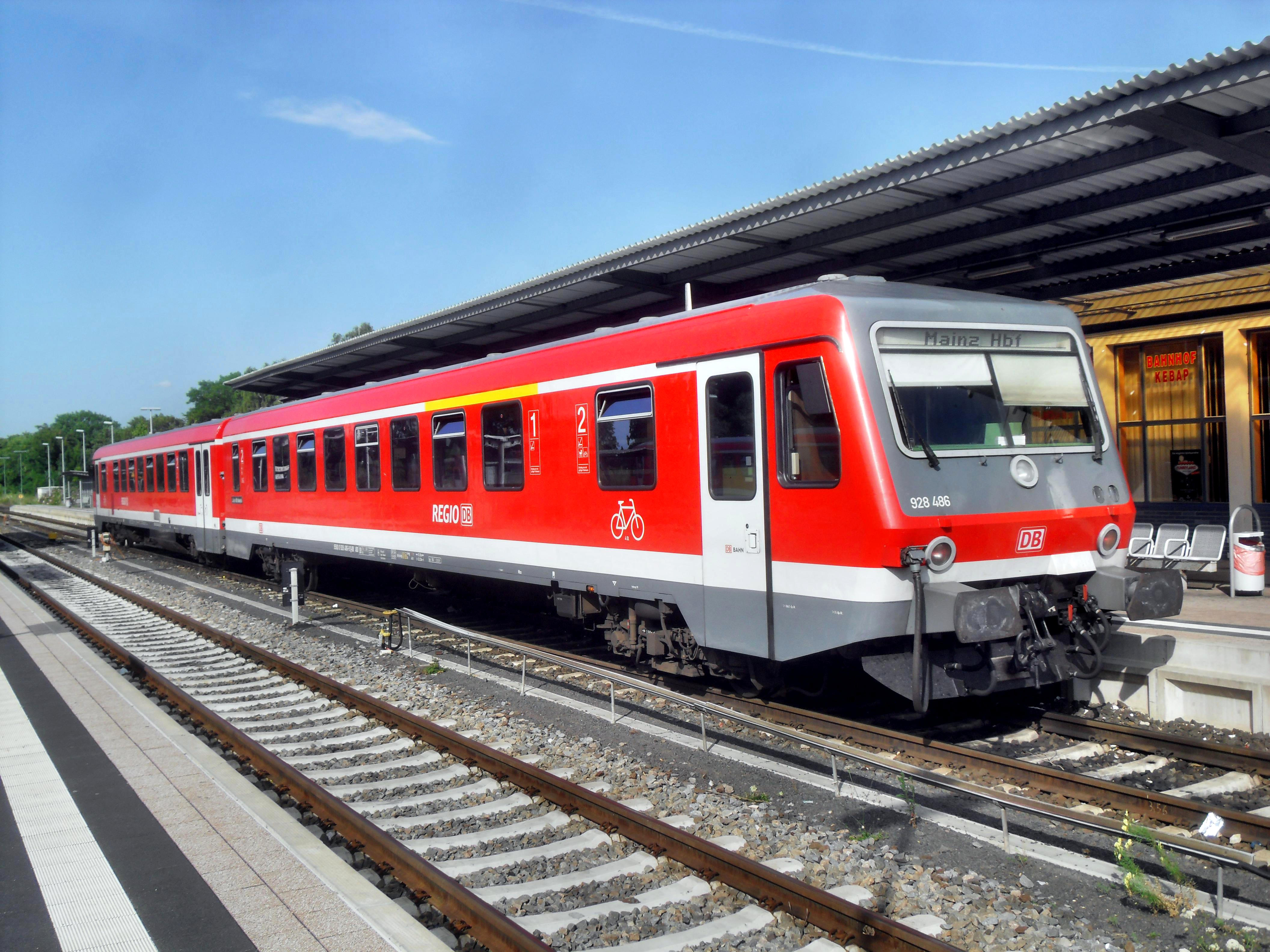
Regionalbahn service with DB Class 628 set in Alzey station running to Mainz Hbf

Alzey station has three platforms with a total of five platform tracks. Track 1 is the “home” platform.

Tracks 1 and 2 are used here for services to Mainz, Worms and Bingen. Services on the Donnersberg Railway to Kirchheimbolanden usually run from track 3. Tracks 4 and 5 are largely overgrown and are disused. The island platforms (tracks 2–5) can only be reached through a pedestrian underpass. The three platforms in use have a length of 171 metres.

Platform tracks 1 to 3 have barrier-free access for the disabled. There is no lift for tracks 4 and 5.

=== Freight yard ===
Alzey freight yard is south of Alzey station, but it was shut down decades ago. The buildings are now sold or rented and the open spaces of the freight yard are used for the bus station and a supermarket.

=== Depot ===
Also to the south was a locomotive depot (Bw Alzey), which was built in 1904, with a 4-stall engine shed, a roundhouse with a turntable and other smaller industrial buildings. The depot lost its independence in 1952 and became a branch of the Worms depot. In subsequent years, the depot was closed down gradually. The turntable has long-since been removed and the engine shed is rented to a bus company. Although the roundhouse is a listed building, it is unused and in danger of collapse.

=== Connections to public transport ===
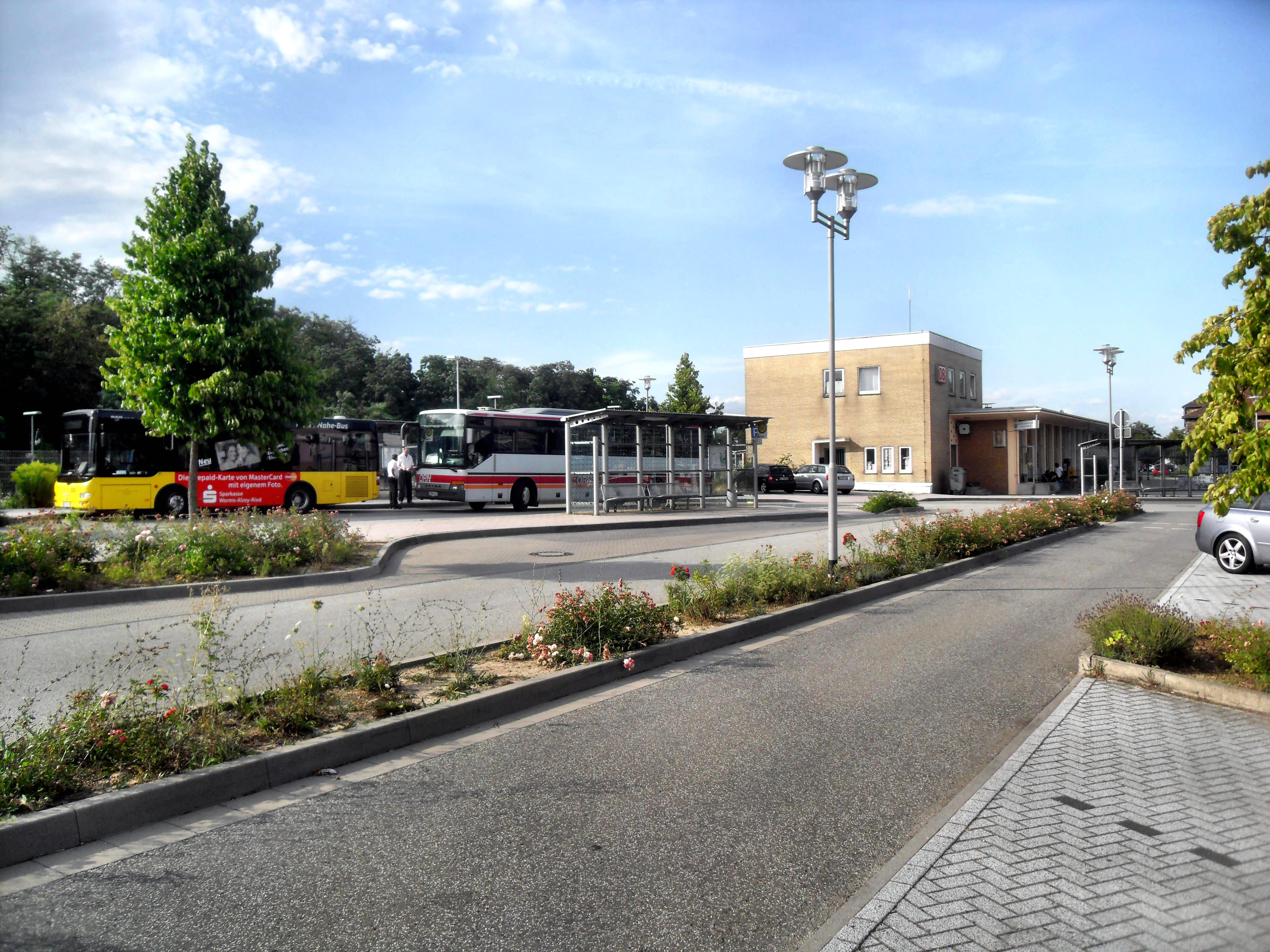
Alzey bus station near Alzey station

South of the entrance building of Alzey station is a bus station where numerous buses of two Deutsche Bahn-owned bus companies, Omnibusverkehr Rhein-Nahe (ORN) and Busverkehr Rhein-Neckar (BRN), call: ORN routes 424, 425, 426, 428, 441, 442, 444, 446 and 660 and BRN routes 427 and 435 run from Alzey to the Rhenish Hesse region. In addition, ORN operates routes 421 and 422 as the so-called “city bus lines”, which run through Alzey town.

Near the entrance building there are plenty of parking spaces. There is also a taxi stand nearby.

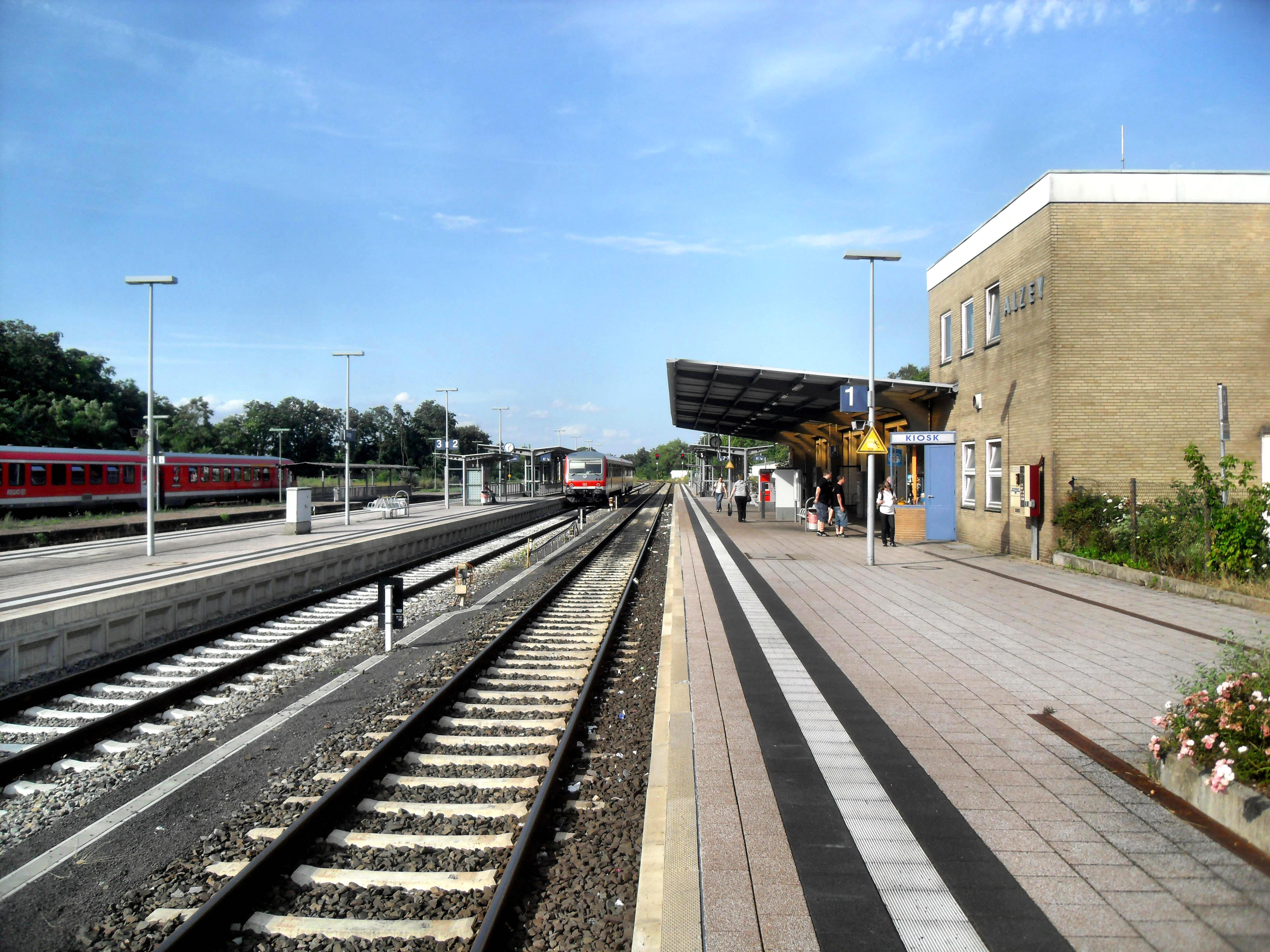
The platforms

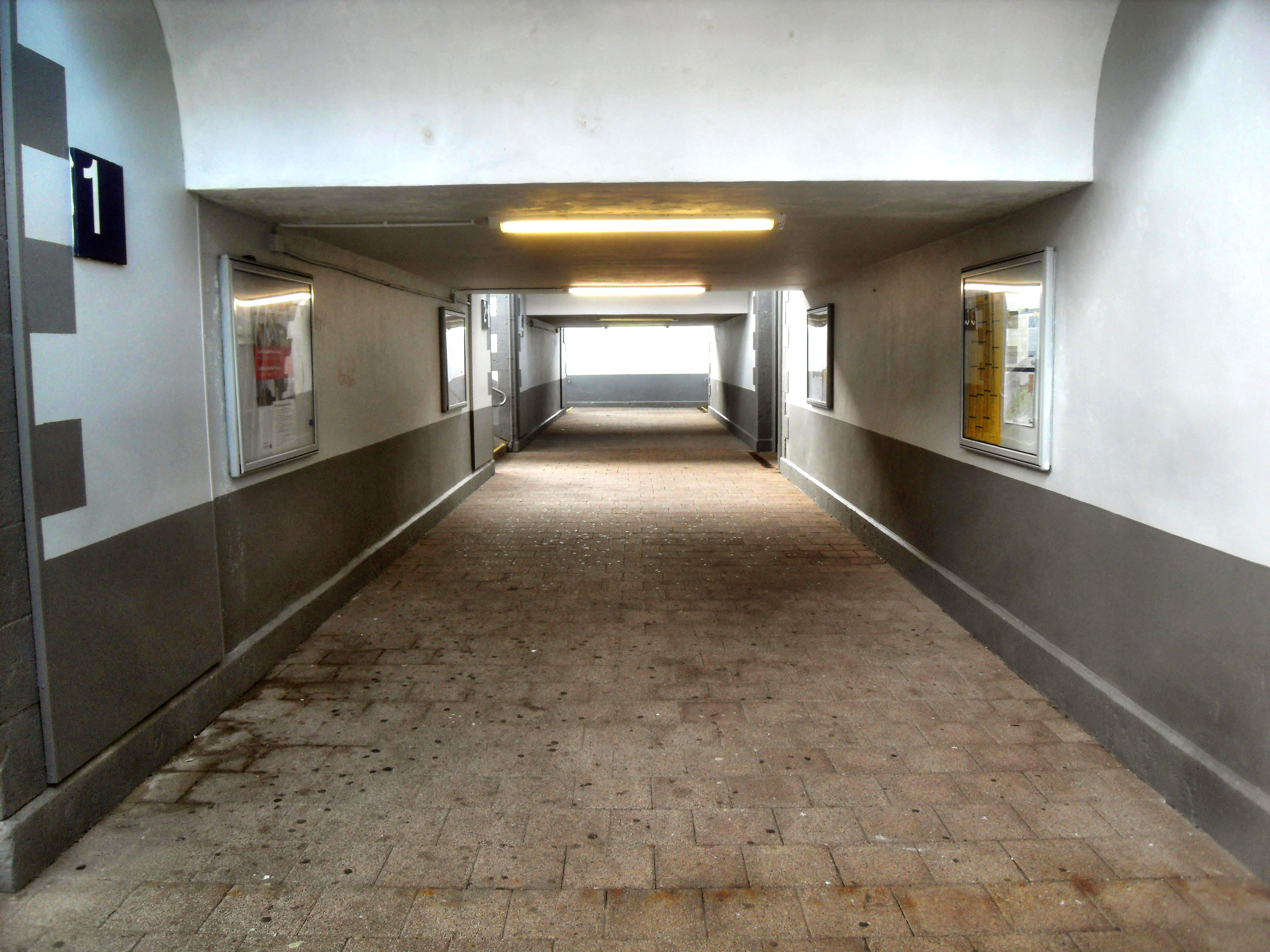
The pedestrian underpass

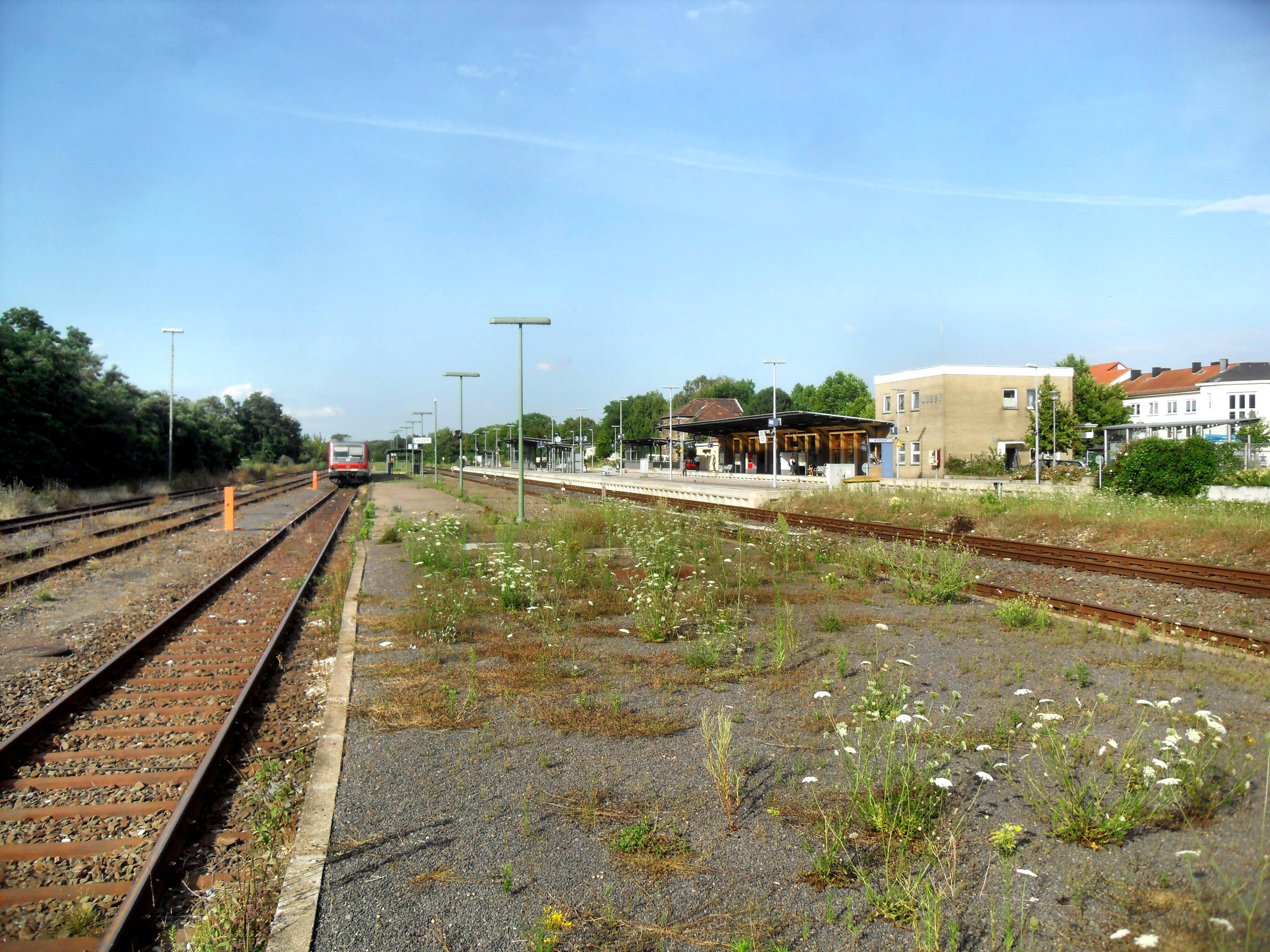
The overgrown platform of tracks 4 and 5

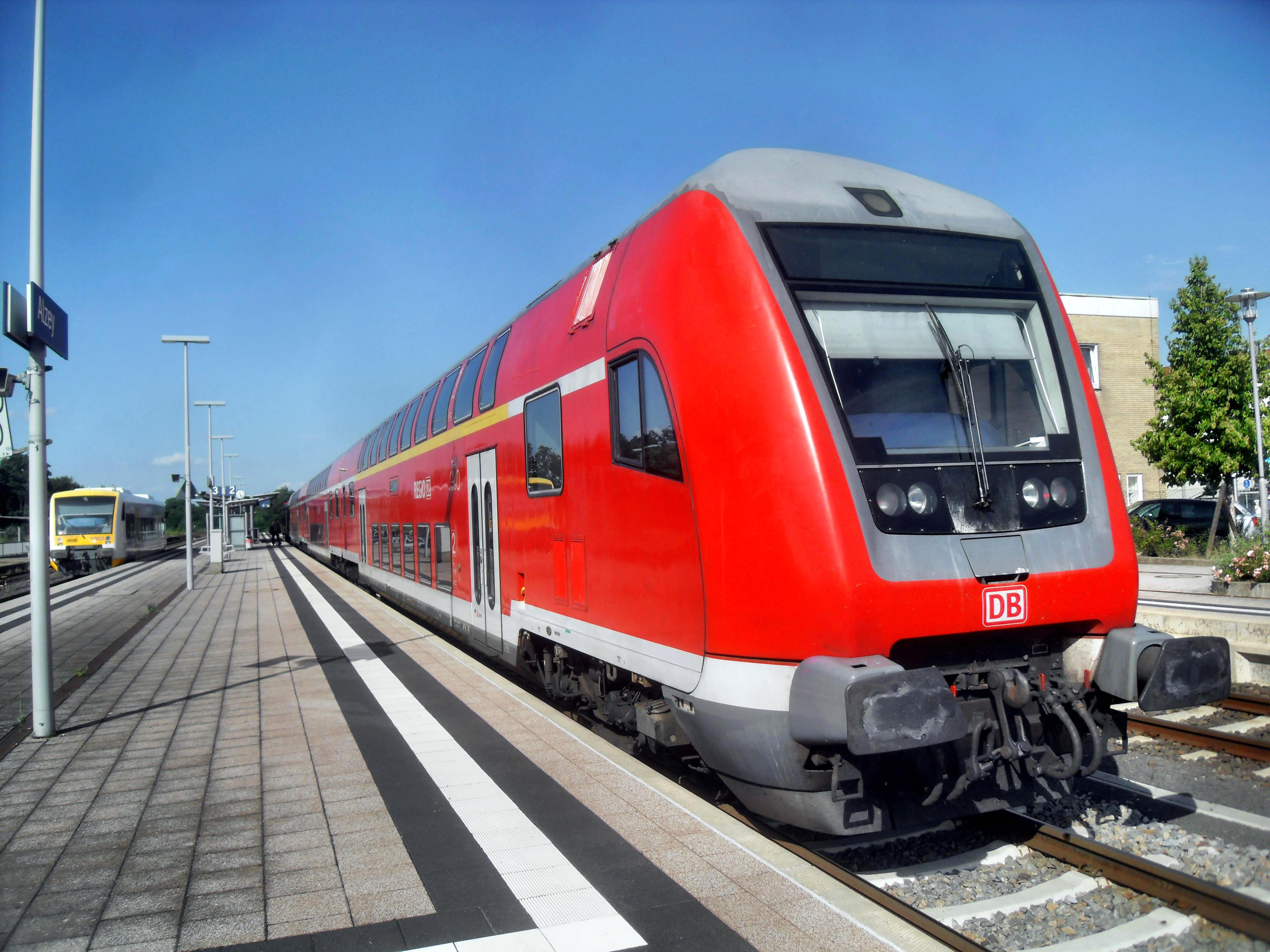
Regionalbahn service on its way to Bingen over the Worms–Bingen line
