= RP-Eisenbahn =

Logo of RP Eisenbahn

RP Eisenbahn GmbH (RPE) is a railway infrastructure manager founded in 1998. The company is based in Wachenheim an der Weinstraße, Germany.

== History ==
RP Eisenbahn GmbH was founded in April 1998 by two private shareholders. The company's activities began in 1999 with the reopening of decommissioned railway lines in the Hunsrück and Palatinate regions.

In 2000, the approximately 31 km long Freiberg-Holzhau railway in Saxony was leased from Deutsche Bahn AG and was completely renovated during a 6-month line closure. While the Deutsche Bahn previously only used one train per direction every two hours and required a travel time of over 60 minutes, the modernization made it possible to reduce the travel time to 40 minutes, so that rail transport is now offered at hourly intervals with the same number of vehicles and without the need for additional personnel. Instead of 54 million Deutsche Mark, as assumed by the DB, the modernisation was achieved with 15 million Deutsche Mark.

In spring 2001, RP Eisenbahn GmbH founded Regio Infra Service Sachsen GmbH together with the Chemnitzer Verkehrs-Aktiengesellschaft (CVAG).

== TÜV certificate ==
The company is certified by TÜV Rheinland in accordance with the ISO 9001:2015 testing standard.

== Network ==
=== Rhineland-Palatinate ===
The route length in Rhineland-Palatinate is 23 kilometres:

- Donnersberg Railway
- Heimbach (Nahe)–Baumholder railway (since September 2006)

=== Saxony ===
The route length in Saxony is 34 kilometres:

- Freiberg (Sachs)–Holzhau (since May 2000)
- Berthelsdorf–Großhartmannsdorf railway (since May 2000)
