= Thionville–Trier railway =

Railway line in France and Germany

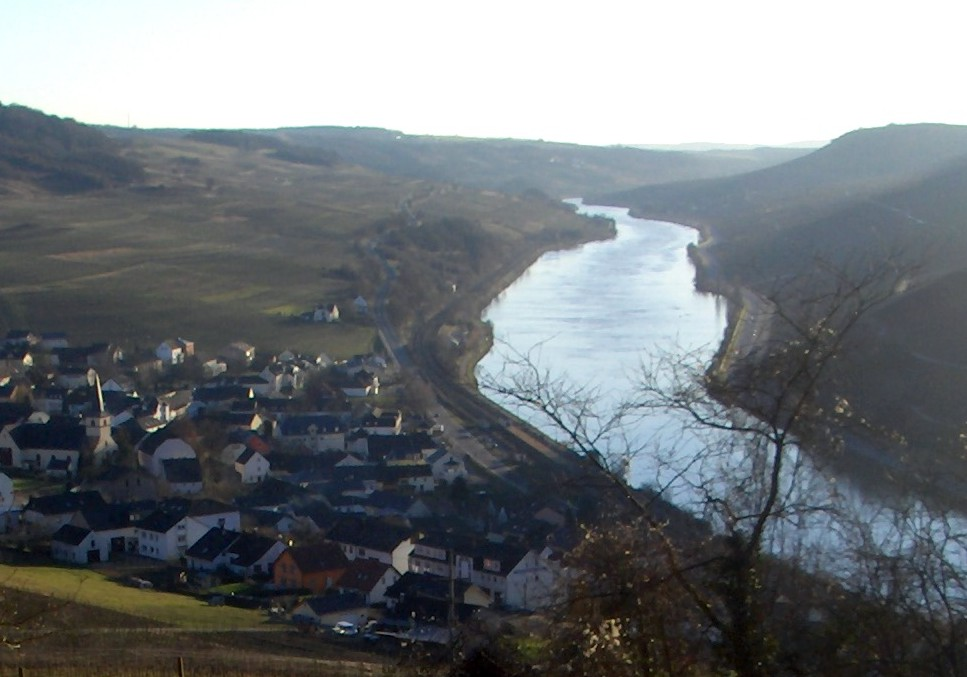
- The Upper Moselle line near Nittel

Overview
- Line number: 3010 (Trier – Perl border); 178 000 (France)
- Locale: Rhineland-Palatinate, Saarland, Grand Est

Service
- Route number: 263e (1944), 692; 152 (France)

Technical
- Line length: 70.1 km (43.6 mi)
- Number of tracks: 2 except: Karthaus Mitte–Saarbrücke and Nittel Tunnel
- Track gauge: 1,435 mm (4 ft 8 1/2 in) standard gauge
- Electrification: 15 kV/16.7 Hz AC overhead catenary (Germany); 25 kV 50 Hz AC overhead catenary (France)
- Operating speed: 120 km/h (75 mph) (maximum)

The Thionville–Trier railway (also called in German the Obermoselstrecke, Upper Moselle line) connects Thionville in the French region of Grand Est with Trier in the German state of Rhineland-Palatinate. It also passes through the westernmost part of the Saarland along the Moselle for a few kilometres.

== History ==
The line was opened for traffic from Metz on 15 May 1878. It connected in Trier with the Saar Railway, which was connected to Luxembourg by the Trier West Railway and the Luxembourg–Wasserbillig line completed in 1861 and to the line from Cologne completed in 1871. The line ended in Ehrang and trains continued over the Trier West route from Konz, because Trier-West station was still Trier's main station. A year later, with the completion of the line to Koblenz, Trier Central Station (Hauptbahnhof, main station) was opened at its current location. The two stations that are in the Saarland, Nennig and Perl were built in 1927 or 1929.

The railway line was part of the so-called Cannons Railway (Kanonenbahn) between Berlin and Metz.

The line between Wellen and Perl was completely closed due to construction from 14 June 2009 to 16 August 2010. A rail replacement bus service was established. As maintaining operations over the two-track infrastructure would have cost €6 million more than the nearly €30 million spent on the renovation work on the Nittel Tunnel, the track was closed despite repeated protests by the transport ministries of Rhineland-Palatinate and the Saarland as well as the Lothringischen Interregionalen Parlamentarierrat (Lotharingia Interregional Parliamentary Council, IPR).

== Route ==
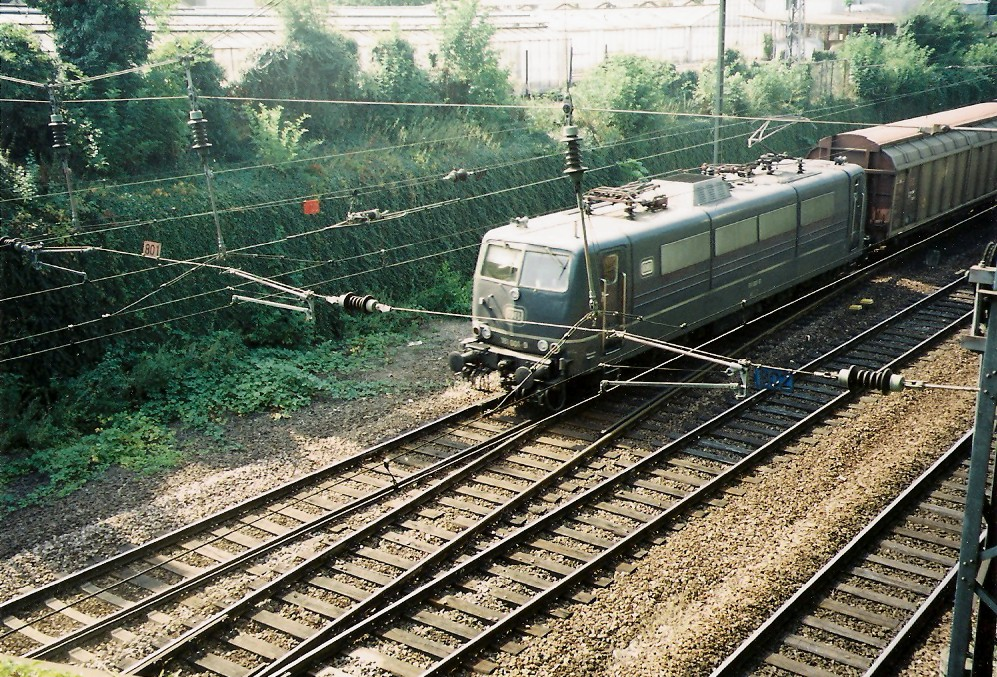
181 001 with a freight train to Apach in September 1998.

The line is continuously double-track, except for the section through the Karthaus-Saar bridge and the Nittel Tunnel, and electrified. It branches from the Metz–Luxembourg line in Thionville and runs largely along the Moselle. It therefore has only a very small gradient. It has no large bridges. Two thirds of the line is now in Germany and the French operating company, TER Lorraine, is responsible for one-third of it. The Regionalbahn service on the German side operates as line RB 82. The stations in the two German states belong to different regional transport networks. In the Trier area (up to the border with the Saarland) they belong to the Verkehrsverbund Region Trier (Transport Association of the Trier region) and the three stations in the Saarland belong to the Saarländischer Verkehrsverbund (Saarland Transport Association).

== Operations ==
Since the change to the summer 2008 timetable, after a gap of over 14 years, passenger trains ran again over the border, but only at weekends at two-hour intervals. Previously, the approximately one-kilometre-long section between the two stations at the border, Perl in the Saarland and Apach in Lorraine, was not served. Both stations were terminal stations for all passenger services in their countries.

As part of the expanded Rhineland-Palatinate integrated timetable of 2015 (Rheinland-Pfalz-Takt 2015), some Regionalbahn services were extended from the timetable change in December 2014 from Perl to Thionville.

== Rolling stock ==
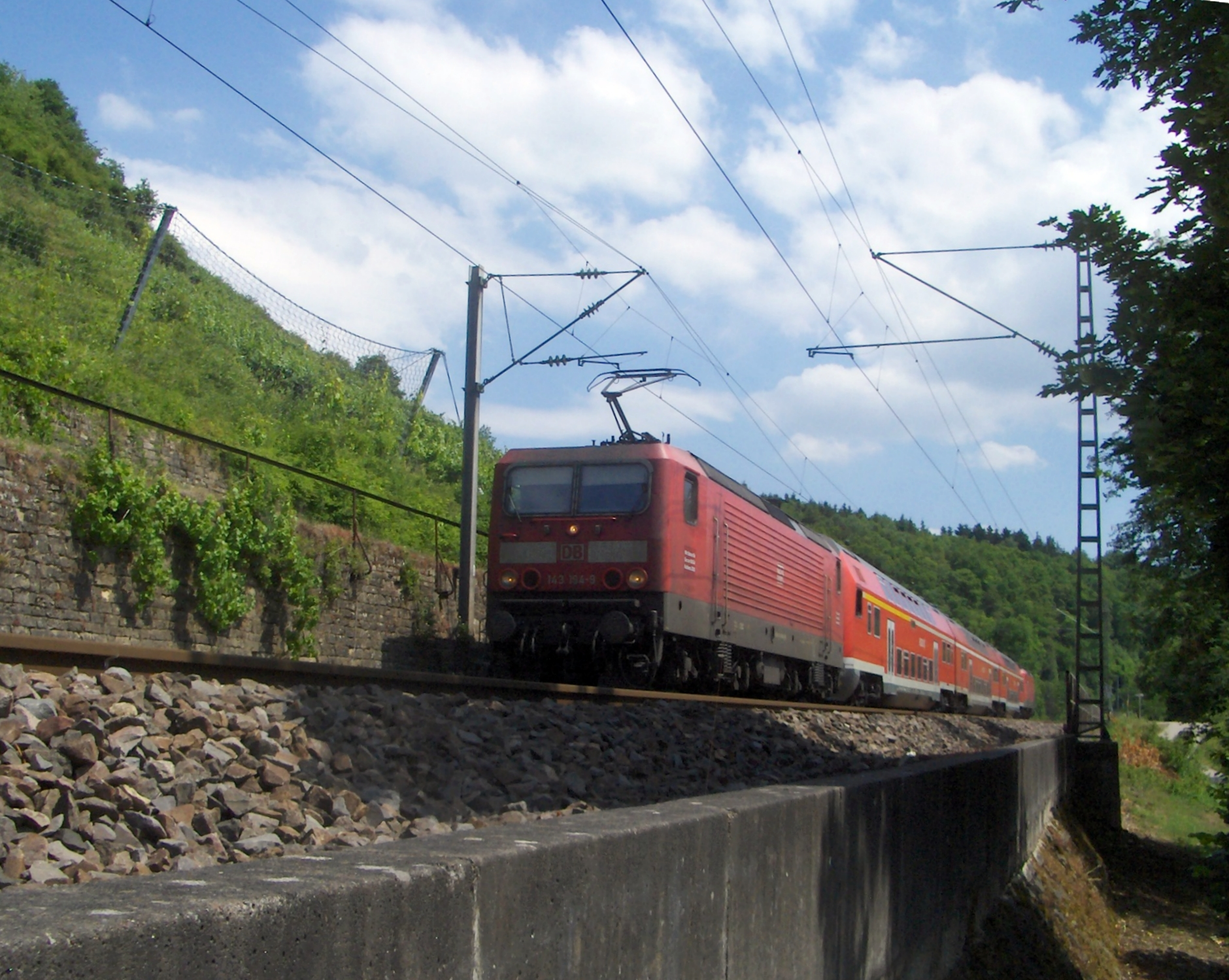
Regionalbahn train composed of class 143 locomotive hauling double deck carriages in the summer of 2011 near Wehr.

After the end of steam traction in 1974, the line was largely used by locomotives of class 181 hauling passengers and freight trains. In freight transport, these were followed by Trier V160 locomotives (reclassified as class 216 in the 1970s), then Class 215 locomotives from the 1980s. In passenger services Uerdingen railbuses were also used on the German side and the French used class X 4300 diesel multiple units of the SNCF. Class 670 railcars were briefly used in 1996, but did not prove themselves in service.

Only since the turn of the millennium, has rolling stock use changed fundamentally. Class 425 and 426 electric multiple units are used for passenger services. These should have been replaced by Bombardier Talent 2 (class 442) EMUs in 2010. However, since they were not approved to operate by the Federal Railway Authority (Eisenbahn-Bundesamt), class 143 locomotives were used with older double-decker carriages. French X 73900 (Alstom Coradia) diesel multiple units are used on weekends between Trier and Metz.

In 2011, freight operations were largely in the hands of multi-system locomotives such as the German class 185 (Bombardier TRAXX) and the French BB 37000.
