= Weisenheim =

Weisenheim may refer to:

- Weisenheim am Berg
- Weisenheim am Sand
