= Emil von Schlitz =

German sculptor

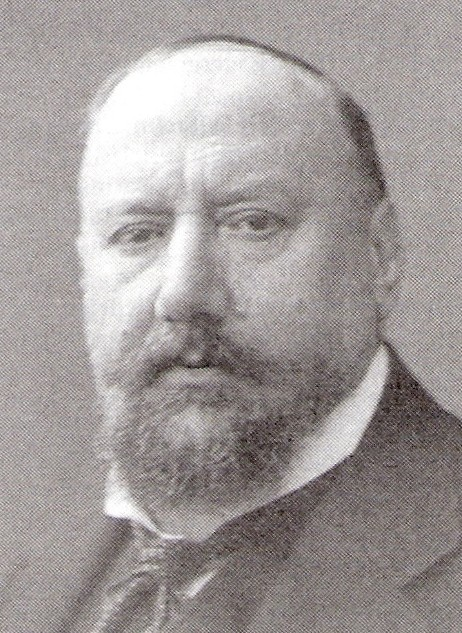
Emil Graf von Schlitz (Hessisches Staatsarchiv Darmstadt)

Emil Friedrich Franz Maximilian Graf von Schlitz genannt von Görtz (15 February 1851, in Berlin - 9 October 1914, in Frankfurt) was a German sculptor, Hessian nobleman, cultural policymaker and confidant of Kaiser Wilhelm II.

== Life ==
He was the son of the Grand Ducal diplomat Count Karl von Schlitz genannt von Görtz and his wife, Princess Anna of Sayn-Wittgenstein-Berleburg (1827–1902). His studies began at the Academy of Fine Arts, Munich, under the sculptor Joseph Echteler. He assumed the title of "Graf" (Count) upon his father's death. From 1885 to 1901, he was Director of the Weimar Saxon-Grand Ducal Art School. In 1894, he founded a pension and annuity association for German artists.

He was a hereditary member of the Upper Chamber of the Landstände des Großherzogtums Hessen and served as President (a position that had been held by his father) from 1900 to 1914.

Prince (later Kaiser) Wilhelm and he had been brought up together, and were both tutored by the famous conservative pedagogue, Georg Ernst Hinzpeter, so they became lifelong friends. He was part of what was known as the "Liebenberger Kreis" (circle, or round table), Wilhelm's inner group of advisors and confidants. The Kaiser was a frequent visitor to the Görtz estates. From 1891 to 1910, he went there every summer to go grouse hunting.

== Work ==
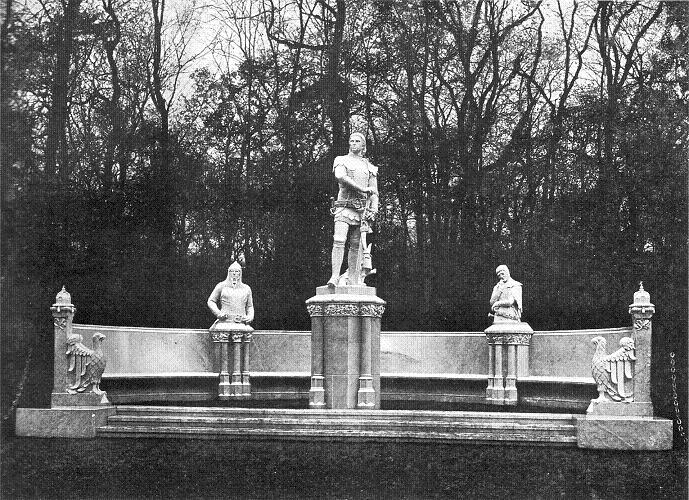
Group 11 in the Siegesallee

His best-known sculptures were those in Group 11 of the Siegesallee (Victory Avenue), consisting of Louis II, Elector of Brandenburg as the centerpiece with Hasso der Rote von Wedel and Friedrich von Lochen, the Landeshauptmann of Altmark in 1346, as the side figures. These statues (along with most of the others in the Siegesallee) were heavily damaged in World War II and are currently displayed in the Spandau Citadel.

His statue of Gaspard II de Coligny, in front of the Berliner Schloss, disappeared entirely.

== Personal life ==
On 15 February 1876 in Konstanz, he married Sophia Cavalcanti d'Albuquerque de Villeneuve (1858-1902), daughter of Julio Constancio de Villeneuve, Comes Romanus (1839-1910) and his wife, Anna Maria Cavalcanti de Albuquerque (1837-1890). They had:

- Countess Anna von Schlitz genannt von Görtz (1877-1938); married in 1910 Patrick MacSwiney, 1st Marquis MacSwiney of Mashanaglass (1871-1945)
- Hereditary Count Carl von Schlitz genannt von Görtz (1877-1911); married Princess Amelie of Thurn und Taxis (1876-1930); had issue
- Countess Elisabeth von Schlitz genannt von Görtz (1879-1940)
- Count Wilhelm von Schlitz genannt von Görtz (1882-1935); married Baroness Catharina Riedesel zu Eisenbach (1883-1969); had issue
- Countess Marie Anna von Schlitz genannt von Görtz (1883-1946); married Count Heinrich von Luxburg (1874-1960); had issue
- Countess Margareta von Schlitz genannt von Görtz (1885-1959); married Magnus von Levetzow (1871-1939); had issue

== Honours ==
He received the following orders and decorations:

- Kingdom of Prussia:
  - Knight of the Black Eagle, with Collar
  - Grand Cross of the Red Eagle
  - Knight of the Royal Crown Order, 1st Class
  - Commander of the Johanniter Order
- Kingdom of Bavaria:
  - Grand Cross of Merit of the Bavarian Crown
  - Knight of the Military Merit Order, 3rd Class
- Grand Duchy of Hesse:
  - Military Medical Cross, 22 June 1871
  - Grand Cross of the Merit Order of Philip the Magnanimous, 31 March 1886
  - Grand Cross of the Ludwig Order, 25 November 1898
- Luxembourg: Grand Cross of the Oak Crown
- Austria-Hungary: Knight of the Iron Crown, 1st Class
- Russian Empire: Knight of the White Eagle
- Saxe-Weimar-Eisenach: Grand Cross of the White Falcon
- Sweden: Commander Grand Cross of the Polar Star

== Other sources/Further reading ==
- Entry in the Deutsche Biographische Enzyklopädie
- Isabel Hull, The Entourage of Kaiser Wilhelm II, Cambridge (1982) ISBN 0-521-23665-7
- John Röhl, The Kaiser and his Court : Wilhelm II and the Government of Germany, translated by Terence F. Cole. Cambridge (1994) ISBN 0-521-40223-9
- Jochen Lengemann: MdL Hessen 1808–1996, Biographical Index, N.G.Elwert (1996), ISBN 3-7708-1071-6, page 333.
