= Weisenheim am Berg =

- Municipality
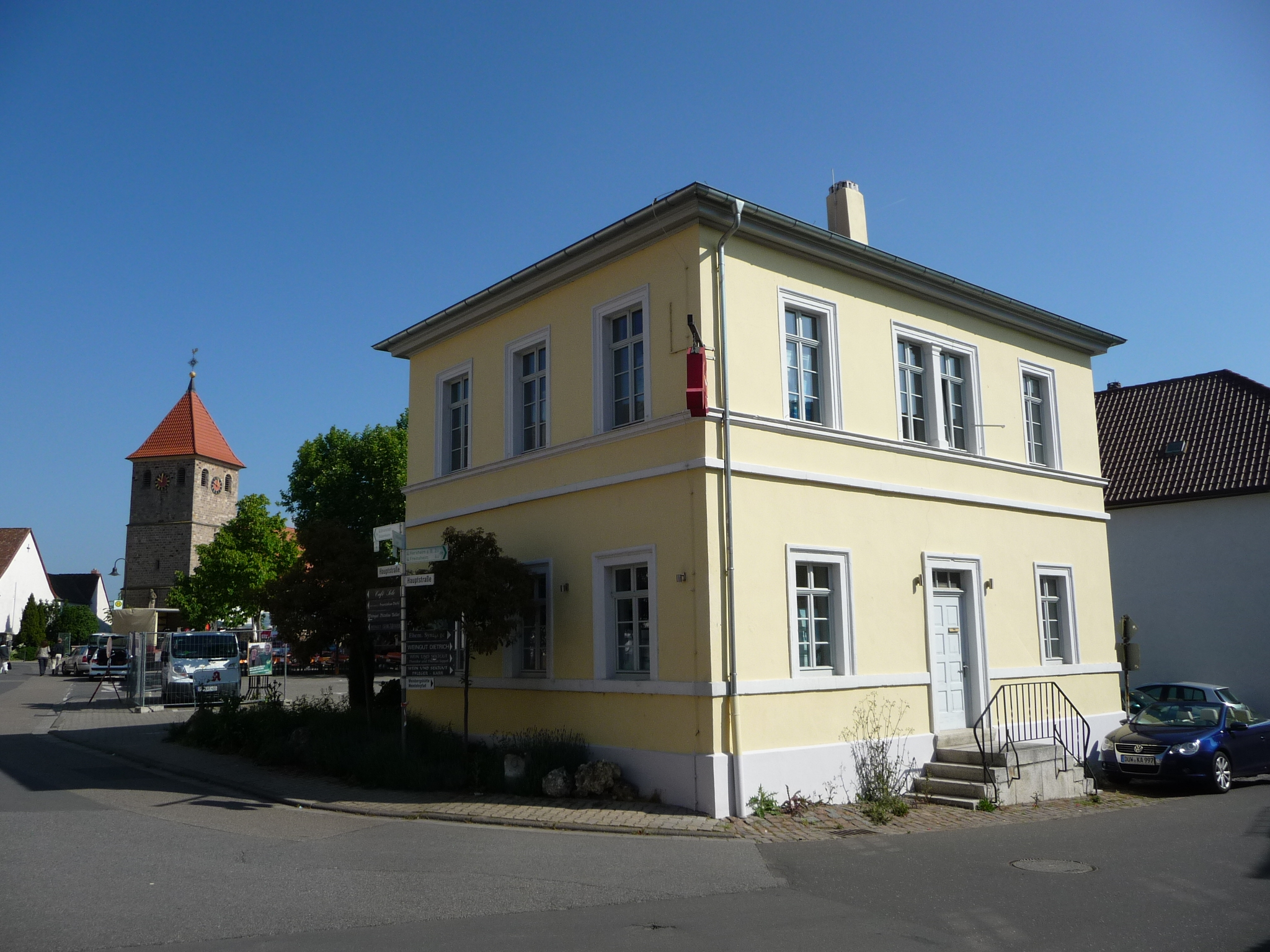
- Former school building by August von Voit

- Coat of arms

- Location of Weisenheim am Berg within Bad Dürkheim district
- Interactive map of Weisenheim am Berg
- Location within Germany Location within Rhineland-Palatinate
- Coordinates: 49°30′43″N 08°09′01″E
- Country: Germany
- State: Rhineland-Palatinate
- District: Bad Dürkheim
- Municipal assoc.: Freinsheim

Government
  - Mayor (2019–24): Joachim Udo Schleweis (CDU)

Area
  - Total: 9.21 km^{2} (3.56 sq mi)
- Elevation: 230 m (750 ft)

Population (2025-12-31)
  - Total: 1,670
  - Density: 181/km^{2} (470/sq mi)
- Time zone: UTC+01:00 (CET)
  - Summer (DST): UTC+02:00 (CEST)
- Postal codes: 67273
- Dialling codes: 06353
- Vehicle registration: DÜW
- Website: www.weisenheim.de

Weisenheim am Berg (Palatine German: Weisrem, or to distinguish it from Weisenheim am Sand, Weisemberg) is an Ortsgemeinde – a municipality belonging to a Verbandsgemeinde, a kind of collective municipality – in the Bad Dürkheim district in Rhineland-Palatinate, Germany.

== Geography ==
=== Location ===
The municipality lies on the edge of the Haardt range in the Palatinate. Woods cover 54.7% of the municipal area. Weisenheim am Berg belongs to the Verbandsgemeinde of Freinsheim, whose seat is in the like-named town.

=== Neighbouring municipalities ===
Clockwise from the north, these are Bobenheim am Berg, Herxheim am Berg, Leistadt and Altleiningen.

== History ==
In 771, Weisenheim am Berg had its first documentary mention in the Lorsch codex.

== Politics ==
=== Municipal council ===
The council is made up of 16 council members, who were elected at the municipal election held on 7 June 2009, and the honorary mayor as chairman.

The municipal election held on 7 June 2009 yielded the following results:

	SPD	CDU	FDP	Total
2009	6	9	1	16 seats
2004	6	9	1	16 seats

=== Coat of arms ===
The German blazon reads: Von Silber und Schwarz geteilt, oben die miteinander verschlungenen schwarzen Großbuchstaben WAB, unten ein sechsstrahliger goldener Stern, beseitet von je einer silbernen Rose mit goldenem Butzen.

The municipality's arms might in English heraldic language be described thus: Per fess argent the letters W, A and B in fess ligatured sable, and sable a mullet Or between two roses of the first seeded of the third.

The arms go back to a village seal from 1764. The charges in the escutcheon's lower half are unclear. They could be a reference to the old local court.

The arms have been borne since 4 April 1984.

Coat of arms

"Banner" (vertical flag for hoisting from a horizontal pole)

=== Town partnerships ===
Weisenheim am Berg fosters partnerships with the following places:

- Plaus (Italian pronunciation: [ˈplaus]), South Tyrol, Italy
- Saint-Gengoux-le-National, Saône-et-Loire, France
- (Germany) Niederdorla, Unstrut-Hainich-Kreis, Thuringia

== Culture and sightseeing ==
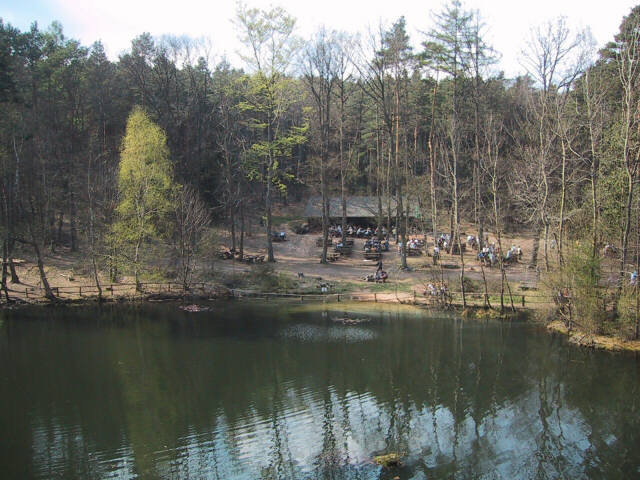
Ungeheuersee

=== Natural monuments ===
The nearby Ungeheuersee reservoir, surrounded by mixed forest, is protected as a natural monument.

=== Regular events ===
- At the long weekend around Ascension Day, Weisenheim’s biggest regular event is held, the traditional Partnership, Wine and Homeland Festival.
- Each year on the next to last weekend in August, the Kerwe, a wine festival, is held.
- On the Sunday before Volkstrauertag, the Stutzenfest is held at which new citizens are initiated.

== Economy and infrastructure ==
=== Transport ===
To the east runs Bundesstraße 271, which in the north leads to the Autobahn A 6. In Herxheim am Berg is a railway station on the Pfälzische Nordbahn. From Bad Dürkheim runs the Rhein-Haardtbahn to Ludwigshafen and Mannheim. Public transport is integrated into the VRN, whose fares therefore apply.

=== Education ===
Weisenheim has one kindergarten and one primary and regional school.

== Famous people ==
=== Sons and daughters of the town ===
- Otto Georgens, auxiliary bishop in the Bishopric of Speyer
