= Ungeheuersee =

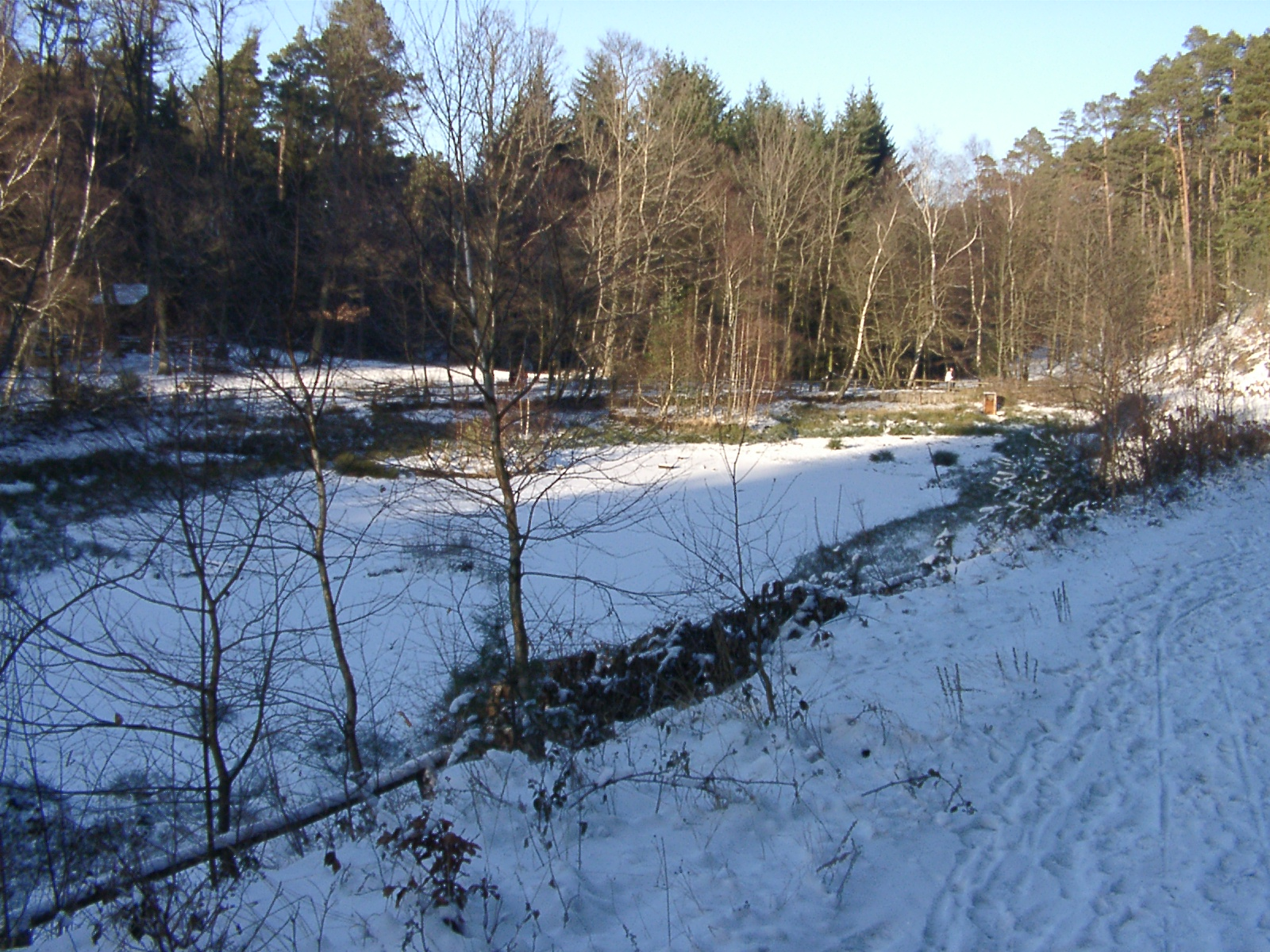
- The Ungeheuersee in winter

- Location within Rhineland-Palatinate
- Location: Rhineland-Palatinate
- Coordinates: 49°29′57″N 8°07′20″E
- Primary outflows: Krumbach
- Basin countries: Germany

The Ungeheuersee in the Palatinate Forest of Germany is a raised bog pond surrounded by mixed forest, which is located about three kilometres west-southwest of the village of Weisenheim am Berg. Because the lake is part of the only raised bog in the Palatinate Forest and is important for the species-rich flora along its shore and on its floating island (including cotton grasses and orchids), it was placed under protection in the 1930s as a natural monument.

The lake is fed from two springs; its tail waters form the Krumbach. The Krumbach valley is designated as a protected landscape as far as the edge of the Haardt uplands.

The Ungeheuersee was laid out towards the end of the Middle Ages or Early Modern Period as a drinking pool for cattle. It was first mentioned in the records in 1599. The name has nothing to do with the German word Ungeheuer ("monster") but is derived from the words Unger for wood pasture and Heyer for enclosure.

According to one legend, no one ventured near the lake when it was still unmanaged and boggy. There were tales of forest spirits that walked abroad around midnight. A forest woman was supposed to live by the lake who robbed many a child.

Another legend reports that before the village of Weisenheim am Berg was raided during the Thirty Years' War, the villagers sank the valuable bells from the church tower in the Ungeheuersee in order to hide them. The village was then razed and all those who knew of the sunken bells disappeared. The bells were never found again. The monks of Höningen Abbey also sank their silver bells in the lake for security, but these, too, remain lost.

On the shore of the Ungeheuersee is the Weisenheimer Hut (also called the Ungeheuersee Hut) belonging to the Palatinate Forest Club, which is open at weekends and is a popular destination. In recent years, intensive touristic use of the reservoir has led serious damage of the natural monument.
