= Erpolzheim =

- Municipality
- Coat of arms

- Location of Erpolzheim within Bad Dürkheim district
- Interactive map of Erpolzheim
- Location within Germany Location within Rhineland-Palatinate
- Coordinates: 49°29′21″N 08°13′28″E
- Country: Germany
- State: Rhineland-Palatinate
- District: Bad Dürkheim
- Municipal assoc.: Freinsheim

Government
  - Mayor (2019–24): Alexander Kurt Bergner

Area
  - Total: 3.60 km^{2} (1.39 sq mi)
- Elevation: 100 m (330 ft)

Population (2025-12-31)
  - Total: 1,350
  - Density: 375/km^{2} (971/sq mi)
- Time zone: UTC+01:00 (CET)
  - Summer (DST): UTC+02:00 (CEST)
- Postal codes: 67167
- Dialling codes: 06353
- Vehicle registration: DÜW

Erpolzheim is an Ortsgemeinde – a municipality belonging to a Verbandsgemeinde, a kind of collective municipality – in the Bad Dürkheim district in Rhineland-Palatinate, Germany.

== Geography ==
=== Location ===
The municipality lies in the Palatinate on the German Wine Route. Erpolzheim belongs to the Verbandsgemeinde of Freinsheim, whose seat is in the like-named town.

== History ==
In 781, the municipality had its first documentary mention as Erbholfesheim.

== Politics ==
=== Municipal council ===
The council is made up of 16 council members, who were elected at the municipal election held on 7 June 2009, and the honorary mayor as chairman.

The municipal election held on 7 June 2009 yielded the following results:

| | SPD | CDU | FWG | Total |
| 2009 | 5 | 4 | 7 | 16 seats |
| 2004 | 5 | 6 | 5 | 16 seats |

=== Coat of arms ===
The German blazon reads: Von Blau und Silber gespalten, rechts ein halber rotbewehrter silberner Adler am Spalt, links eine aufgerichtete blaue Weintraube mit grünen Blättern.

The municipality’s arms might in English heraldic language be described thus: Per pale azure issuant from the line of partition an eagle displayed argent armed and langued gules, and argent a bunch of grapes slipped proper reversed.

The village’s oldest known seal from the 16th century bears the eagle as a charge, the device also borne by the Counts of Leiningen, who held the local lordship. Late in that same century, the grapes were added to stand for winegrowing. Some later seals, however, showed another plant with three leaves. The current arms are based on seals from the 16th and 17th centuries. They have been borne since 17 July 1952.

== Culture and sightseeing ==
=== Regular events ===
Each year in May, a culinary walking tour is held for fruit, asparagus and wine with 16 sampling stops offering homemade treats amidst the blossoming fruit groves and vineyards.

Along the 6.5 km walking circuit one finds, besides asparagus dishes, also other specialities and Erpolzheim wines.

Each year on the second-last weekend in August, the Weinkerwe (wine fair) is held.

At the Erpolzheimer Martinsmarkt (market) in November, artists display their works in the open courtyards.

== Economy and infrastructure ==
=== Wine ===
In Erpolzheim, the following wineries and wine estates can be found:

- Weingut Hubach
- Winzerhof Horst Koch
- Weingut Kohl
- Weingut Herbert Koob & Sohn
- Winzerhof Ruth Mayer
- Weingut Veddeler

=== Transport ===
Erpolzheim lies on the single-track Neustadt an der Weinstrasse - Bad Dürkheim - Freinsheim - Grünstadt railway line and it has a stop with a railway station building, although it is not used as such, but rather as a house. In the village centre by the church is a bus stop served by Busverkehr Rhein-Neckar (BRN) route 453.

== Notable people ==
=== Sons and daughters of the town ===
- Georg Ludwig von Maurer (1790–1872), jurist, legal historian and politician.
