= Freinsheim =

- Town
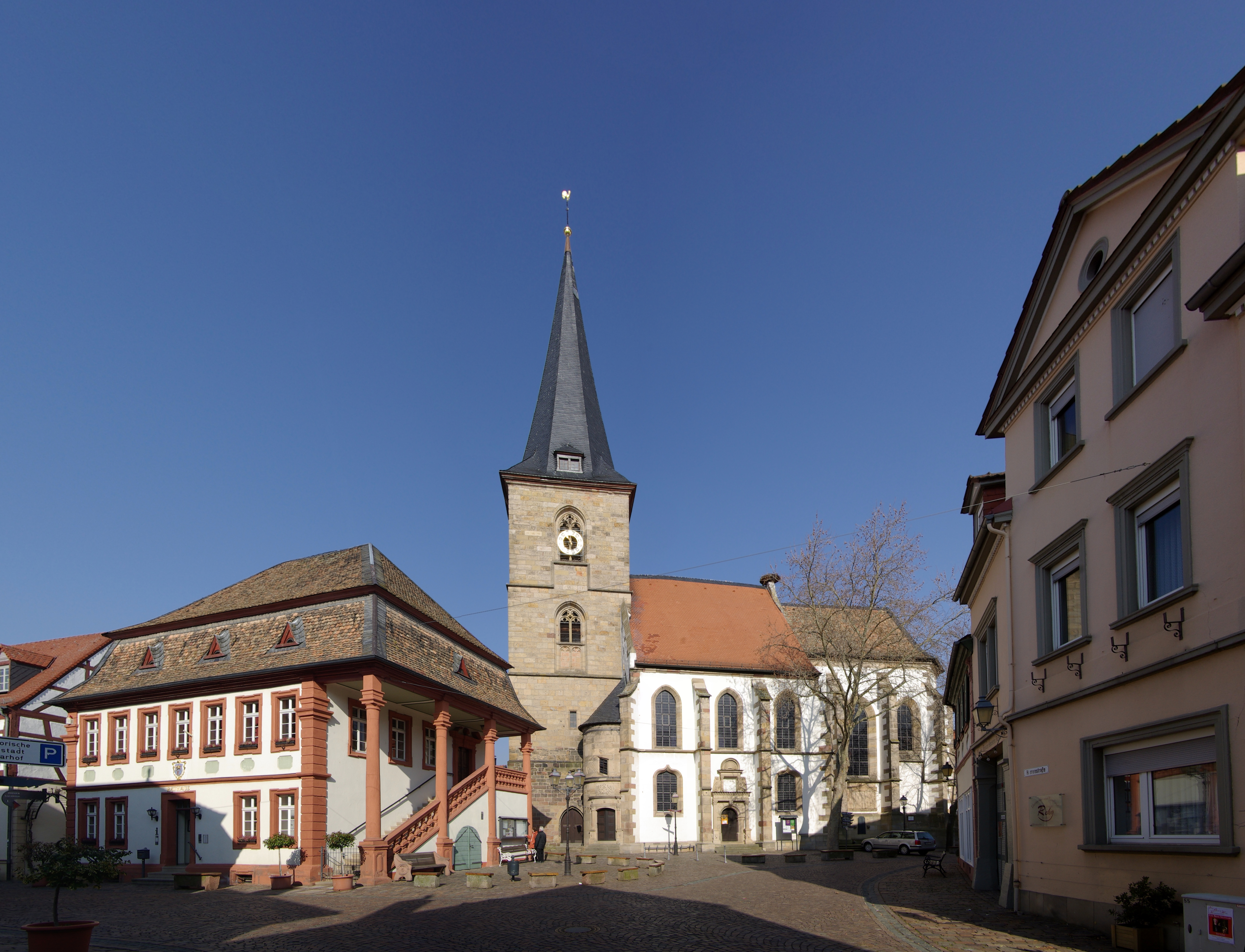
- Town hall and protestant church

- Flag Coat of arms

- Location of Freinsheim within Bad Dürkheim district
- Interactive map of Freinsheim
- Location within Germany Location within Rhineland-Palatinate
- Coordinates: 49°30′27″N 8°12′31″E
- Country: Germany
- State: Rhineland-Palatinate
- District: Bad Dürkheim
- Municipal assoc.: Freinsheim

Government
  - Mayor: Jochen Weisbrod (CDU)

Area
  - Total: 13.59 km^{2} (5.25 sq mi)
- Elevation: 72 m (236 ft)

Population (2025-12-31)
  - Total: 4,854
  - Density: 357.2/km^{2} (925.1/sq mi)
- Time zone: UTC+01:00 (CET)
  - Summer (DST): UTC+02:00 (CEST)
- Postal codes: 67251; 67098 (Lindemannsruhe); 67247, 67248 (P.O. boxes)
- Dialling codes: 06353; 06322 (Lindemannsruhe)
- Vehicle registration: DÜW
- Website: www.stadt-freinsheim.de

Freinsheim (German pronunciation: [ˈfʁaɪnshaɪm]; Palatine German: Fränsem) is a town in the Bad Dürkheim district in Rhineland-Palatinate, Germany. With about 5,000 inhabitants, it is among the state's smaller towns. It is also the seat of the like-named Verbandsgemeinde, a kind of collective municipality.

== Geography ==
Freinsheim lies in the Upper Rhine Plain at the eastern edge of the Palatinate Forest, roughly 20 km west of Ludwigshafen between Bad Dürkheim (about 6 km to the southwest) and Grünstadt near the German Wine Route. Within town limits rises the Fuchsbach.

== History ==
As established by various archaeological finds, Freinsheim's municipal area has been continuously settled by human beings for roughly 5,000 years. An organized community likely existed beginning in the 6th century, as witnessed by the discovery of a Merovingian linear graveyard. Freinsheim had its first documentary mention in 773 in the Weißenburg Monastery's records (this place is now Wissembourg in Alsace, France).

In the 15th century, Freinsheim passed to the Electorate of the Palatinate, under whose care the existing fortifications were completed. The town wall's most recent building work is the äußeres Eisentor (“outer iron gate”), finished in 1514. In 1689, Freinsheim sustained heavy destruction in the Nine Years' War (known in Germany as the Pfälzischer Erbfolgekrieg, or War of the Palatine Succession); only foundations were left standing. In the 18th century came reconstruction. Administrative functions within the Electorate of the Palatinate (such as the institution of an Unteramt) helped bring about an economic upswing. After the French Revolution and the Congress of Vienna, Freinsheim passed to the Kingdom of Bavaria along with the rest of the Palatinate on the Rhine’s left bank. Until 1818, Freinsheim belonged to a Ganerbschaft (joint inheritance), which comprised the Leiningen villages of Leistadt, Herxheim am Berg and Kallstadt as well as the Electorate of the Palatinate villages of Freinsheim and Weisenheim am Sand.

A small number of immigrants are known to have moved from Freinsheim to Pennsylvania in the 18th century, including Henry Antes, a leader of the Moravian Church.

After the Second World War, Freinsheim belonged to the newly founded federal state of Rhineland-Palatinate. It has been seat of the Verbandsgemeinde since 1972. With effect from 23 June 1979, given its historical importance, the Rhineland-Palatinate Landtag bestowed the title Stadt (“town”) upon Freinsheim.

== Politics ==
=== Town council ===
The council is made up of 20 council members, who were elected at the municipal election held on 9 June 2024, and the honorary mayor as chairman.

The distribution of seats in the local council:

Wahl	SPD	CDU	FDP	GRÜNE	FWG	Gesamt
2024	5	7	2	2	4	20 Sitze
2019	4	5	2	3	6	20 Sitze
2014	6	5	1	1	7	20 Sitze
2009	8	5	2	–	5	20 Sitze
2004	8	7	1	–	4	20 Sitze
1999	9	6	2	1	2	20 Sitze

- FWG = Freie Wählergruppe der Stadt Freinsheim e. V.

=== Mayors ===
Matthias Weber (FWG) was elected Stadtbürgermeister in June 2016. He is the successor of Jürgen Oberholz (FWG). Jochen Weisbrod (CDU) was elected in June 2024.

=== Coat of arms ===
The town's arms might be described thus: Per fess azure a demi-lion rampant sinister Or armed, langued and crowned gules and argent an uppercase letter F of the third between two bunches of grapes in fess of the first.

The crowned lion symbolizes the historical connection with the Electorate of the Palatinate, since this charge was that state's emblem (although it is halved here), while the F is, of course, the town's initial. The two bunches of blue grapes stand for the local winegrowing, which began quite early on with red wine varieties, which nowadays take up almost half of the cultivated vineyard area within the town.

The town's earliest seal comes from the early 15th century, and shows the arms borne by the local fiefholders, the Lords of Meckenheim. However, the current arms are based on the town's second seal, dating from 1446. Some versions since that time have shown roses instead of the grapes that appear now.

Historically, the Palatine Lion should be shown on a sable (black) field. When these arms were granted, though, the tinctures were not the traditional Palatine ones, but rather the Bavarian ones, as the town was part of the Kingdom of Bavaria at the time.

The arms have been borne since 1845.

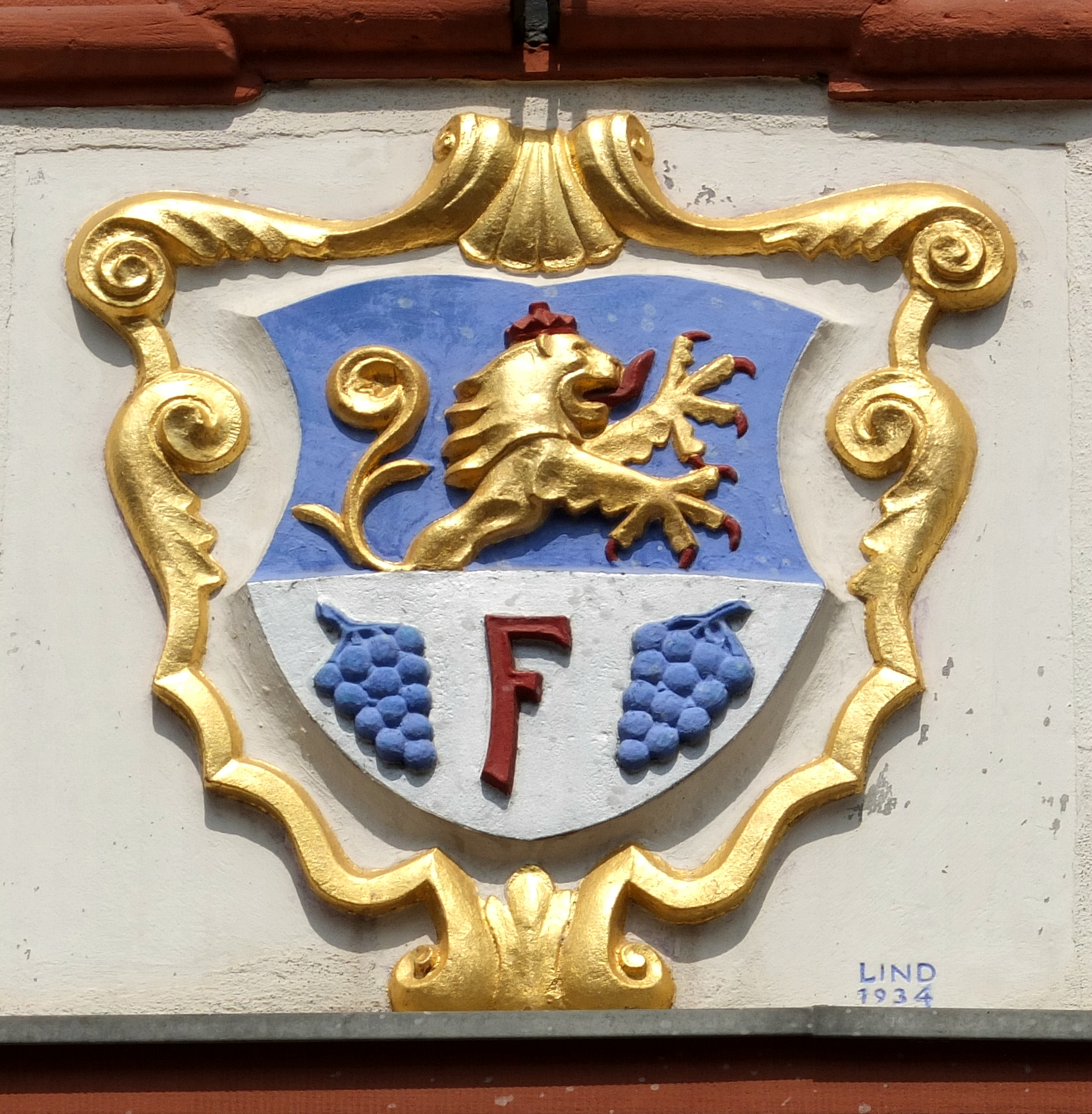
Town coat of arms

Town flag

Town "Banner" (vertical flag for hoisting from a horizontal pole)

=== Verbandsgemeinde ===
As seat of the Verbandsgemeinde of Freinsheim, Freinsheim is home to its administration. Belonging to the Verbandsgemeinde are the municipalities of Bobenheim am Berg, Dackenheim, Erpolzheim, Herxheim am Berg, Kallstadt, Weisenheim am Berg and Weisenheim am Sand.

=== Town partnerships ===
Freinsheim fosters partnerships with the following places:

- Marcigny, Saône-et-Loire, France
- (Germany) Buttstädt, Sömmerda, Thuringia

== Culture and sightseeing ==
=== Literature prize ===
In memory of one of Freinsheim's most important citizens, the Hermann-Sinsheimer-Preis has been awarded since 1983. Prizewinners thus far have been, among others, Siegfried Lenz, Hilde Domin, Carola Stern, Marcel Reich-Ranicki and Marion Gräfin Dönhoff.

=== Buildings ===
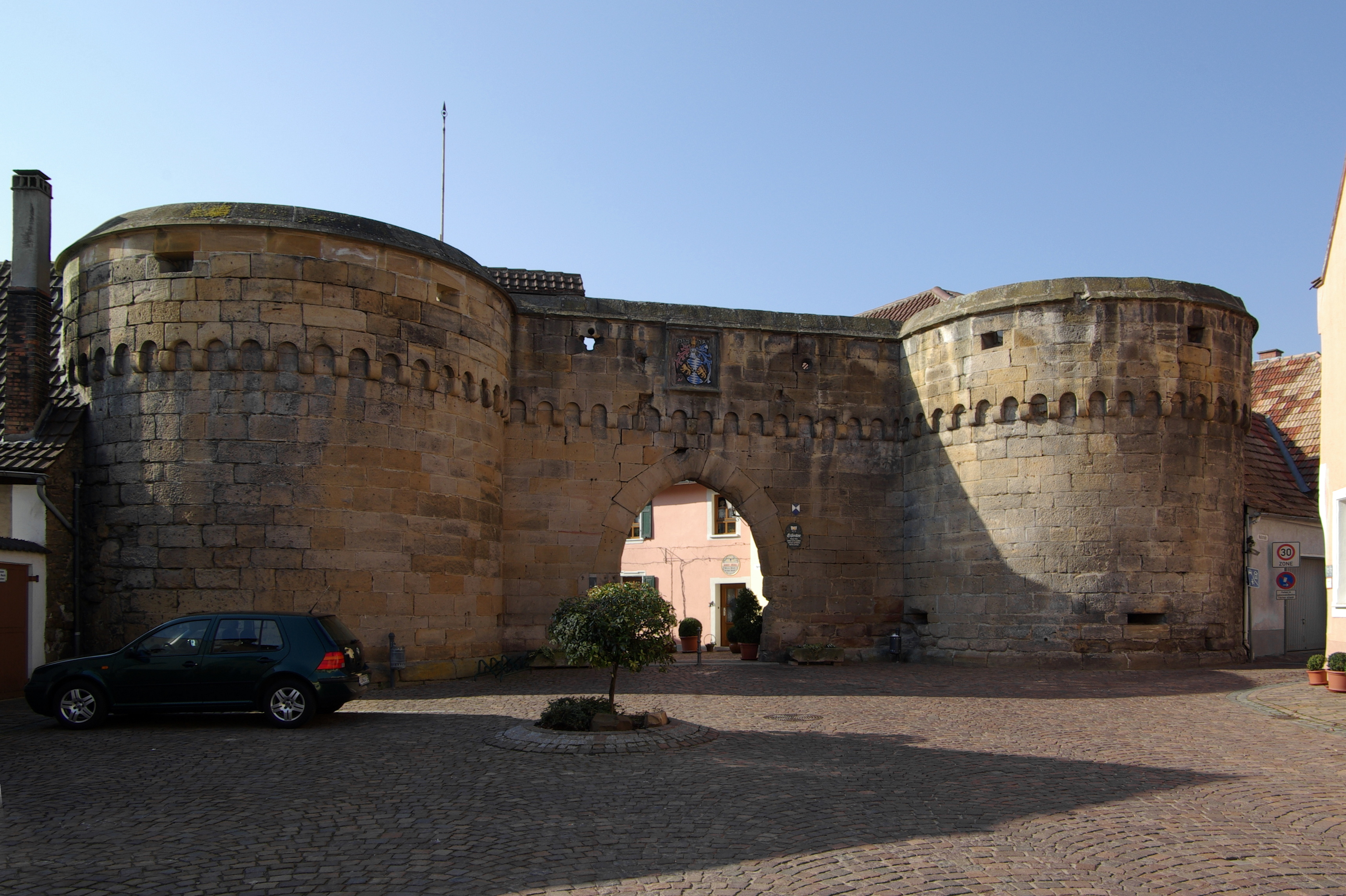
The Eisentor in the town wall

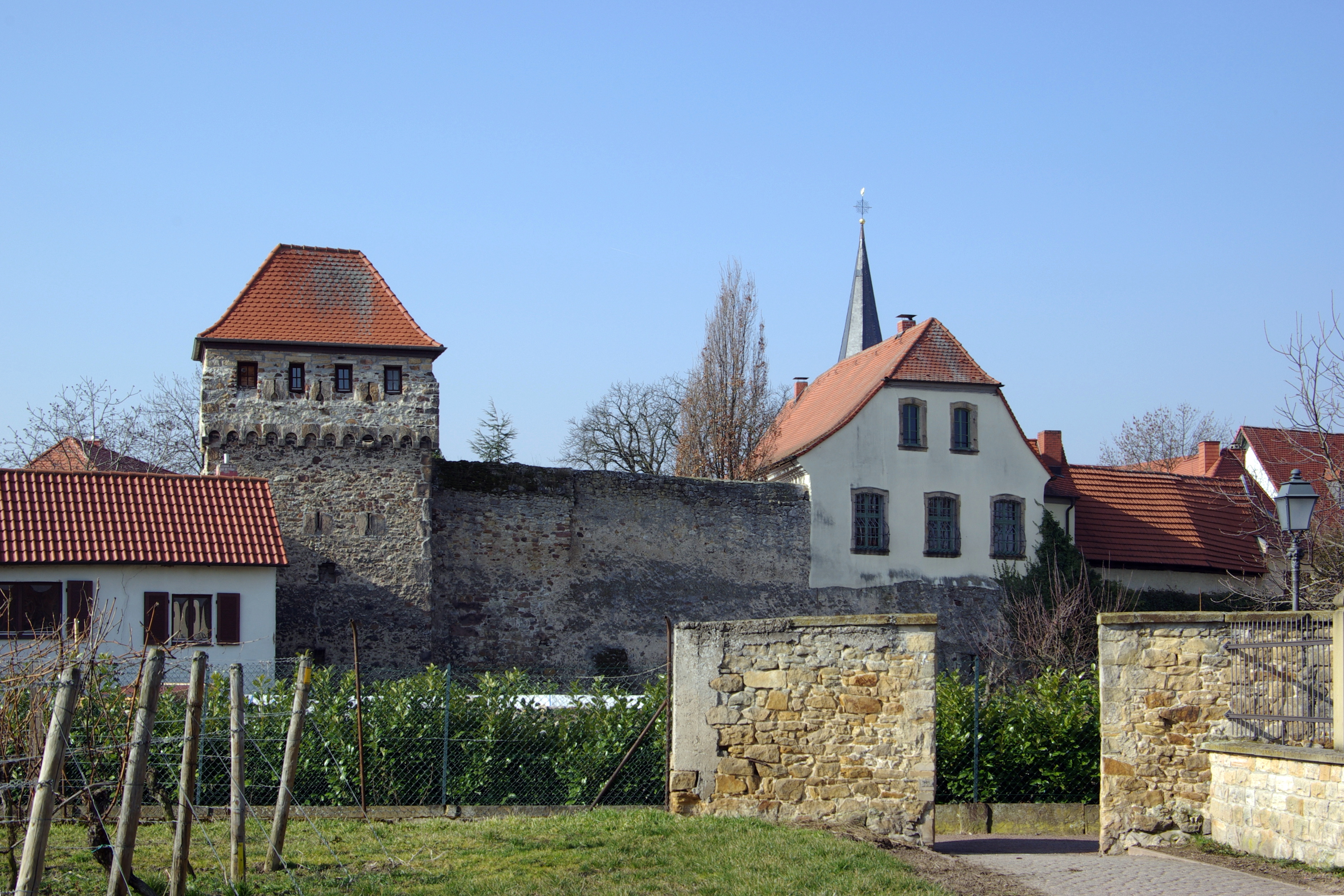
Part of the town wall

==== Town wall ====
A particularity of Freinsheim is the Late Gothic town wall with its towers and gates, which has been almost wholly preserved and is roughly 1 300 m long. It forms the basis of the town's historical appearance. The outer gate at the Eisentor (“Iron Gate”) has flanking towers and the Electorate of the Palatinate coat of arms.

==== Protestant parish church ====
The old main church of Freinsheim was, until its destruction in 1689, probably a Late Gothic hall church. Today it has a flat ceiling. The lower floor of the tower is still Romanesque.

==== Former castle ====
The moated castle, which was held by the Electorate of the Palatinate beginning in 1471, lies outside the town wall. The round moat is still filled with water today. The main building standing today is a private house from the early 19th century.

==== Wayside shrine ====
In the vineyards on the road to Ungstein stands a Late Gothic Bildstock with a Crucifixion group in a frame with a pointed arch. It bears the name Schwarzes Kreuz (“Black Cross”), after which one of Freinsheim's wineries has named itself.

==== West tower ====
The Romanesque Westturm at the mountain graveyard south of and somewhat outside the town is a former entrance tower to the likewise Romanesque Chapel of Our Lady on the Mountain. Forms on the west portal suggest an origin in the mid 11th century. The original roofing is no longer present.

=== Regular events ===
==== Rotweinwanderweg ====
The Rotweinwanderweg (“Red Wine Trail”) is held on the fourth weekend in January. It opens on the Friday at dusk with a torchlight hike on which log torches (Schwedenfeuer) are made. On the Saturday and Sunday, the hiking takes place in the daytime, during which local winemakers along the trail through the vineyards around Freinsheim offer hikers selected red wines and dishes to go with them.

==== Freinsheimer Altstadtfest ====
Each year on the first weekend in June, the Freinsheim Old Town Festival is held. Its motto is Wein und Kultur auf historischen Plätzen (“Wine and culture on historic squares”). In this, the town of Freinsheim places much importance on sophisticated cultural performances, which are then presented at the marketplace, the Retzerhof or the Saarhof. As a rule, the festival lasts from Friday to Sunday.

==== Stadtmauerfest ====
The Town Wall Festival held on the third weekend in July in the historic gate is among the region's biggest wine festivals.

==== Kulinarischer Weinwanderweg ====
The Culinary Wine Trail is held on the fourth weekend in September, running through the town's vineyards. Winemakers and gastronomical businesses offer traditional Palatine cooking, Mediterranean dishes, wine and Federweisser.

==== Weihnachtsmarkt ====
The Christmas Market on the four weekends in Advent attracts visitors with its Nativity scene, in which living animals are used.

== Economy and infrastructure ==
=== Economy ===
Although winegrowing has been edging fruitgrowing out as the town's main agricultural endeavour since the mid 20th century, the town is nevertheless still the seat of one of Germany's great fruit juice producers. Today, Freinsheim is among the Palatinate’s biggest winegrowing centres. Because of the historic Old Town, meanwhile, tourism has also grown into an important economic factor.

== Transport ==
Freinsheim station is at the junction of the Palatine Northern Railway (Bad Dürkheim–Grünstadt) and the Freinsheim–Frankenthal railway line, affording direct links towards Neustadt, Frankenthal and, by way of Grünstadt, to Monsheim or Ramsen.

From both Neustadt and Frankenthal run long-distance links towards Mannheim, Saarbrücken and Mainz.

Over the nearby Bundesstraße 271, Freinsheim is linked to the Autobahnen A 6 (Mannheim–Saarbrücken), A 61 (Koblenz–Speyer) and A 65 (Ludwigshafen–Karlsruhe).

Except on the main thoroughfares (Landesstraßen, or State Roads), the whole town is either a 30 km/h zone or a zone with traffic-calming measures in place.

== Famous people ==
=== Sons and daughters of the town ===
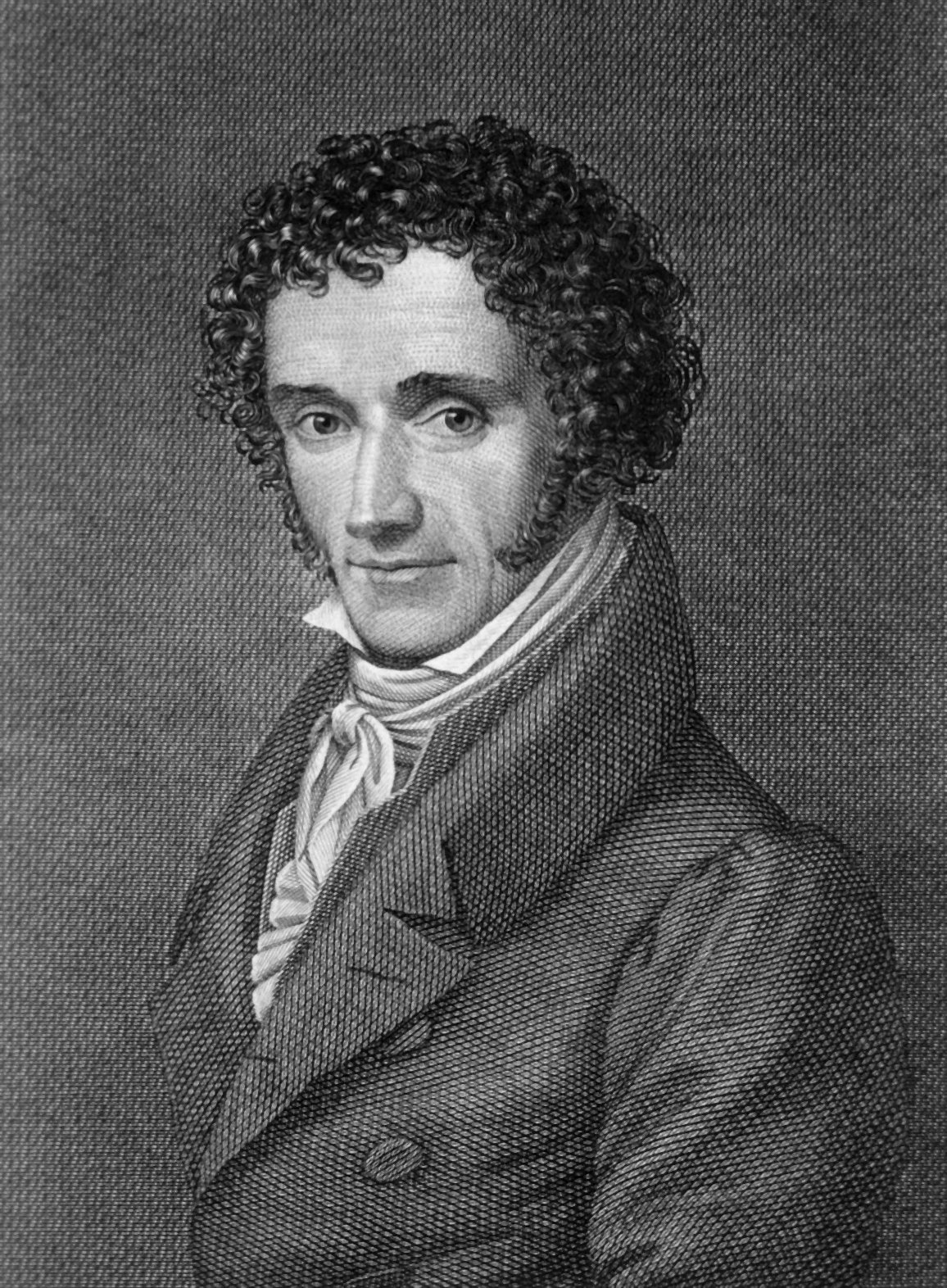
Philipp Lorenz Geiger

- Jacob Gottfried Weber (1779–1839), trained jurist, was a musician at the Mannheim Conservatory.
- Philipp Lorenz Geiger (1785–1836), chemist and pharmacist
- Philipp Tillmann (1809–died after 1881), politician
- Philipp Merkle (1811–1899), German-American Freethinker and preacher
- Hermann Sinsheimer (1883–1950), journalist and jurist, was editor-in-chief of Simplicissimus; in his honour Freinsheim awards the Hermann-Sinsheimer-Preis. In his Am Schwarzen Kreuz (“At the Black Cross”) stories, Sinsheimer wrote down his memories of his childhood in Freinsheim.
- Franz Lind (1900–1966), painter and sculptor
- Manfred Scherer (1951–), politician (CDU)

=== Famous people associated with the town ===
- Emil Bert Hartwig (1907–1996), painter, student of the master Paul Klee, lived in Freinsheim and died there.
- Friedrich Jossé (1897–1994), painter and graphic artist, grew up in Freinsheim.
