= Patrick MacSwiney, 1st Marquis MacSwiney of Mashanaglass =

Franco-Irish officer of the Papal Household

Valentine Emanuel Patrick MacSwiney, 1st Marquis MacSwiney of Mashanaglass (24 December 1871 – 7 May 1945) was a Franco-Irish officer of the papal household.

In 1898, he was created a hereditary marquis in the Papal nobility.

MacSwiney retired in 1910, on his second marriage, and moved to England, where his daughters were born. In 1914 he and his German wife settled in Ireland, where he joined the Irish Volunteers and later enjoyed a second public career under the Irish Free State.

== Early life ==
Born in Paris, MacSwiney was the son of Valentine Patrick MacSwiney, a French banker of Irish origins, and his Polish wife Emma Isabella Countess Konarska. His grandfather was Dr Valentine MacSwiney of Macroom. He was educated at the University of Paris (Sorbonne), and in 1883, after graduating in arts, joined the Papal Household of Pope Leo XIII as Chamberlain of Honour. In 1895 he was promoted to Privy Chamberlain.

Apart from being a fluent speaker of English and French, MacSwiney later mastered German, Spanish, Italian, Portuguese, Russian, and Modern Greek.

Through his mother, MacSwiney was a first cousin of Sir Vernon Kell, a British Army general and founder and first Director of the British Security Service MI5.

== Papal career ==
In 1897 MacSwiney was elected as Vice-President of the International Scientific Congresses of Catholics at Fribourg, and in 1900 held the same office at Munich. That year, he was sent as Envoy Extraordinary of the Order of the Holy Sepulchre to the Crown Prince of Belgium. He served as Privy Chamberlain to Pope Pius X from 1904 to 1909. In 1904, he was a member of the Apostolic Legation to Ireland for the consecration of Armagh Cathedral, and in 1908 was a special delegate for receiving diplomatic missions on the occasion of Pius X's Jubilee. He conducted several successful missions to Balkan countries. MacSwiney retired from the service of Pius X in 1910 and in 1912 settled with his family in Ireland.

In 1898, MacSwiney was created by Leo XIII a hereditary Roman marquis. The MacSwineys were a landowning family from County Cork, having first held land at Mashanaglass near Macroom, and the territorial designation of the new title referred to it.

== Career in Ireland ==
In 1914, the Irish Republican Brotherhood formed the Irish Volunteers, in which MacSwiney enlisted as a private. When the movement split, he remained with the pro-John Redmond National Volunteers and became its Inspecting Officer for County Kerry. In 1916, at the time of the Easter Rising, MacSwiney was arrested by the British and held with Count Plunkett at Dublin Castle, but was not interned.

He joined the Cork Historical and Archaeological Society in 1917 and was it vice-president from 1927 to 1937.

In 1918, he was greatly troubled by the destruction of Irish forests during the war and wrote an article for Irish Forestry in which he said "Time has come for action, for immediate action, there is not an instant to be lost."

MacSwiney represented the Irish Free State government at the celebration of the 1300th anniversary of Saint Columbanus at Bobbio and was a member of the Irish delegation to the fourth and fifth Assemblies of the League of Nations at Geneva in 1923-1924.

From 1934 to 1939, he was Vice-President and acting Chancellor of the Irish Association and became its President in 1939. He was also a Vice-President of the Royal Irish Academy from 1936 to 1939.

== Personal life ==
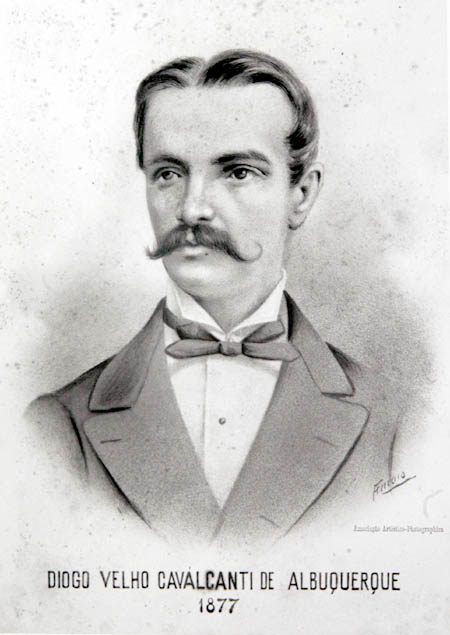
Diogo Velho Cavalcanti de Albuquerque

On 25 October 1895, in Paris, MacSwiney married firstly the Brazilian-born Stella Cavalcanti de Albuquerque, a daughter of Diogo Velho Cavalcanti de Albuquerque, Visconde de Cavalcanti. This marriage was annulled by the Holy See in 1896. In 1910, MacSwiney married secondly Anna Countess von Schlitz von Goertz, the eldest child of Emil von Schlitz von Goertz, and a cousin of his first wife; their daughters Honora Emma Anna Sophie Emily Mary Ross and Mary Elizabeth Sophie Patricia were born in St George's, Hanover Square, Westminster, in 1911 and 1913 respectively. Settling at 39 Upper FitzWilliam Street, Dublin, the MacSwineys later had a son, Owen Charles Alexander Evelyn Patrick Valentine Diego de Avila MacSwiney, born in Dublin on 30 July 1916, who later succeeded his father as Marquis MacSwiney of Mashanaglass.

MacSwiney's second wife died in 1938. In 1944, he married thirdly Miss Constance Bradfield-England, of Sally Park, Clondalkin. He died in Dublin aged 73 and was buried in the churchyard at Shandon, County Cork.

At the time of his death, MacSwiney was still living at 39 Upper Fitzwilliam Street. He left an estate in England and Wales valued for probate at £34,791.

In 1954, the second Marquis MacSwiney married Mathilde Maria Josefa Thaddaa von Korff (1916–2009). A Bachelor of Laws of University College Dublin, he was an author and dress designer.

== Honours ==
- Equestrian Order of the Holy Sepulchre of Jerusalem
- Order of St. Gregory the Great
- Sovereign Military Order of Malta, 1932
- Fellow of the Royal Society of Antiquaries of Ireland

== Publications ==
- Valentine Emmanuel Patrick MacSwiney de Mashanaglass (1re Marquis), Le Portugal et le Saint-Siège (Paris: A. Picard et Fils, 1899)
- "Notes on the Book of Lecan", by The Marquess MacSwiney of Mashanaglass, Proceedings of the Royal Irish Academy, vol. xxxviii, 1902, C3
- MACSWINEY, Patrick, of Mashanaglass, Marquis, A propos du Home Rule et de la résistance de l'Ulster (Paris, Octavo, 60 pages, c. 1913)
- "Notes on the formation of the first two Irish regiments in the service of Spain in the 18th century" by MacSwiney, Patrick Valentine Emmanuel, The Journal of the Royal Society of Antiquaries of Ireland, Vol. XVII, 1927, pp. 7-20
- "Some unpublished letters of the Count d'Avaux in the National Library of Ireland" by MacSwiney, Patrick Valentine Emmanuel, Marquis of Mashanaglass, in Proceedings of the Royal Irish Academy Vol. XL, Sect. C, April1932, pp. 296-307
