= Georg Ludwig von Maurer =

German statesman and legal historian

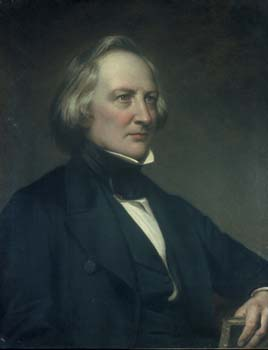
- Born: Georg Ludwig Maurer; 2 November 1790; Erpolzheim, Germany
- Died: 9 May 1872 (aged 81); Munich, Germany
- Education: Heidelberg University
- Occupations: Statesman and legal historian
- Title: Reichsrat of Bavaria
- Spouse: Johanna Wilhelmina Friederike Heydweiller
- Children: Konrad von Maurer

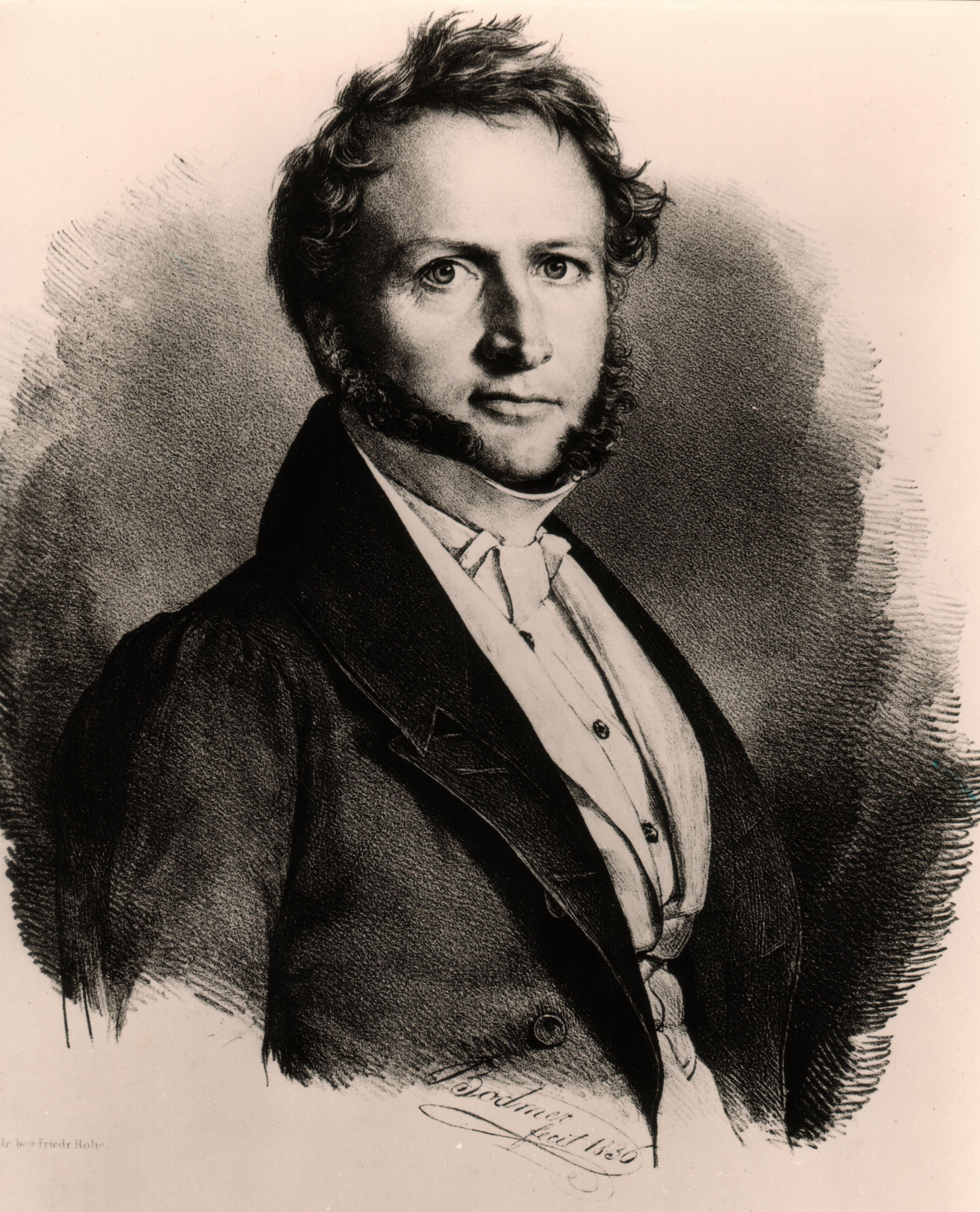
Georg Ludwig von Maurer in an 1836 lithograph by Gottlieb Bodmer

Georg Ludwig Maurer, from 1831 Georg Ludwig von Maurer (2 November 1790 – 9 May 1872) was a German statesman and legal historian from the Electoral Palatinate.

== Biography ==
Maurer was born at Erpolzheim, near Dürkheim as the son of a Protestant pastor.

Educated at Heidelberg, he went in 1812 to reside in Paris, where he entered upon a systematic study of the ancient legal institutions of the Germans. Returning to Germany in 1814, he received an appointment under the Bavarian government, and afterwards filled several important official positions. In 1824, he published at Heidelberg his Geschichte des altgermanischen und namentlich altbairischen oeffentlich-muendlichen Gerichtsverfahrens, which obtained the first prize of the Bavarian Academy of Sciences and Humanities. He became professor at the Ludwig-Maximilians-Universität München (LMU) in 1826.

In 1829 he returned to official life, and in 1831 he was appointed lifelong Reichsrat of Bavaria and awarded the (non-hereditary) title "von Maurer". Soon after, he was offered an important post. In 1832, when Otto (Otho), son of Louis I, king of Bavaria, was chosen to fill the throne of Greece, a regency council was nominated during his minority, and Maurer was appointed a member. He applied himself energetically to the task of creating institutions adapted to the requirements of a modern civilized community; but grave difficulties soon arose and Maurer was recalled in 1834, when he returned to Munich. This loss was a serious one for Greece. Maurer was the ablest, most energetic and most liberal-minded member of the council, and it was through his enlightened efforts that Greece obtained a revised penal code, regular tribunals and an improved system of civil procedure.

Soon after his recall he published Das griechische Volk in öffentlicher, kirchlicher, und privatrechtlicher Beziehung vor und nach dem Freiheitskampf bis zum 31. Juli 1834 (Heidelberg, 1835–1836), a useful source of information for the history of Greece before Otto ascended the throne, and also for the labours of the council of regency to the time of the authors recall. After the fall of the ministry of Karl von Abel (1788–1859) in 1847, he became chief Bavarian minister and head of the departments of foreign affairs and of justice, but was overthrown in the same year. He died in Munich on 9 May 1872.

Georg Ludwig von Maurer was married to a member of the Krefelder silk family Heydweiller, Johanna Wilhelmina Friederike Heydweiller. Their only son, Konrad von Maurer (1823–1902), was a Scandinavian scholar of some repute, and like his father was a professor at the LMU.

== Works ==
Maurer's most important contribution to history is a series of books on the early institutions of the Germans. These are:

- Einleitung zur Geschichte der Mark-, Hof-, Dorf-, und Stadtverfassung und der offentlichen Gewalt (Munich, 1854)
- Geschichte der Markenverfassung in Deutschland (Erlangen, 1856)
- Geschichte der Fronhöfe, der Bauernhöfe, und der Hofverfassung in Deutschland (Erlangen, 1862–1863)
- Geschichte der Dorfverfassung in Deutschland (Erlangen, 1865–1866)
- Geschichte der Städteverfassung in Deutschland (Erlangen, 1869–1875)

These works are still important authorities for the early history of the Germans. Among other works are:

- Stadt- und Landrechtsbuchs Ruprechts von Freysing, ein Beitrag zur Geschichte des Schwabenspiegels (Stuttgart, 1839)
- Über die Freipflige (plegium liberate), und die Entstehung der grossen und kleinen Jury in England (Munich, 1848)
- Uber die deutsche Reichsterritorial- und Rechtsgeschichte (1830)

See KT von Heigel, Denkwürdigkeiten des bayrischen Staatsrats G. L. von Maurer (Munich, 1903).
