= Dackenheim =

- Municipality
- Coat of arms

- Location of Dackenheim within Bad Dürkheim district
- Interactive map of Dackenheim
- Location within Germany Location within Rhineland-Palatinate
- Coordinates: 49°31′18″N 8°11′05″E
- Country: Germany
- State: Rhineland-Palatinate
- District: Bad Dürkheim
- Municipal assoc.: Freinsheim

Government
  - Mayor (2019–24): Edwin Schrank

Area
  - Total: 3.32 km^{2} (1.28 sq mi)
- Elevation: 155 m (509 ft)

Population (2025-12-31)
  - Total: 459
  - Density: 138/km^{2} (358/sq mi)
- Time zone: UTC+01:00 (CET)
  - Summer (DST): UTC+02:00 (CEST)
- Postal codes: 67273
- Dialling codes: 06353
- Vehicle registration: DÜW

Dackenheim is an Ortsgemeinde – a municipality belonging to a Verbandsgemeinde, a kind of collective municipality – in the Bad Dürkheim district in Rhineland-Palatinate, Germany.

== Geography ==
=== Location ===
The municipality lies in the Palatinate along the northernmost stretch of the German Wine Route. Dackenheim lies in the foothills between the Palatinate Forest and the Upper Rhine Plain. It belongs to the Verbandsgemeinde of Freinsheim, whose seat is in the like-named town.

=== Climate ===
Yearly precipitation in Dackenheim amounts to 534 mm, which is very low, falling into the lowest tenth of the precipitation chart for all Germany. Only at 8% of the German Weather Service's weather stations are even lower figures recorded. The driest month is January. The most rainfall comes in May. In that month, precipitation is 1.9 times what it is in January. Precipitation otherwise hardly varies over the year. At 32% of the weather stations, lower seasonal swings are recorded.

== History ==
As the Dackenheim golf course was being built in 1998, witnesses to prehistory were unearthed in the shape of potsherds, which were identified as being from the Rössen culture (4700-4500 BC), leading to the inference that Dackenheim, like the neighbouring town of Freinsheim, might have been settled as early as the New Stone Age. Another find in 1952, with a sandstone human head, might be from the Bronze Age. It can now be found in the Historisches Museum der Pfalz (“Historical Museum of the Palatinate”).

=== Franks and Carolingians ===
Any evidence of human activity in Roman times has not been forthcoming. The placename ending —heim (cognate with English home) suggests that Dackenheim might have been founded about 600, at the time when the Franks were taking the land. Clear clues as to settlement in Merovingian times come from grave goods unearthed in 1910 in the rural cadastral area “In den 24 Morgen”, and others brought to light in 1976 in the field “Am Liebesbrunnen”. The village had its first documentary mention on 22 November 766 in the acts of Lorsch Abbey (document 1143) as Donatio Nantheri in Dagastisheim (Nanther's donation in Dackenheim).

=== 12th to 18th century ===
In the 12th century, Dackenheim was within the Leiningen Counts’ sphere of influence. It was in this time that the Catholic church was built (1147).

In the wake of the Mainz Monasterial Feud – also known as the Baden-Palatinate War – (1461–1462) and after Margarethe von Leiningen-Westerburg's death, Dackenheim passed in 1471 to Electoral Palatinate. The main source for the time that followed is the Dackenheimer Weistum of 1485, 1496 and 1579 (a Weistum – cognate with English wisdom – was a legal pronouncement issued by men learned in law in the Middle Ages and early modern times). Until the late 18th century, Dackenheim remained in Electoral Palatinate's ownership.

In this time, work on the new Lutheran church was begun in 1716; it was converted in 1857.

=== French Republic ===
After having been occupied by the French for a number of years towards the end of the 18th century, the Palatine lands on the Rhine’s left bank were incorporated de jure into the French Republic under the Treaty of Campo Formio (Mairie de Dackenheim, Canton de Durkheim, Arrondissement de Speier, Département de Mont Tonnerre).

== Politics ==
=== Municipal council ===
The council is made up of 8 council members, who were elected by majority vote at the municipal election held on 7 June 2009, and the honorary mayor as chairman.

=== Coat of arms ===
The German blazon reads: In Rot auf grünem Grund nebeneinander, je in goldener Kleidung mit goldener Krone und silberner Gloriole, rechts die Gottesmutter mit dem Kind auf dem rechten Arm, links die heilige Katharina, in der Rechten ein gesenktes silbernes Schwert mit goldenem Knauf und einem zerbrochenen roten Rad zu ihren Füßen, oben zwischen den Kronen und Gloriolen ein sechsstrahliger goldener Stern.

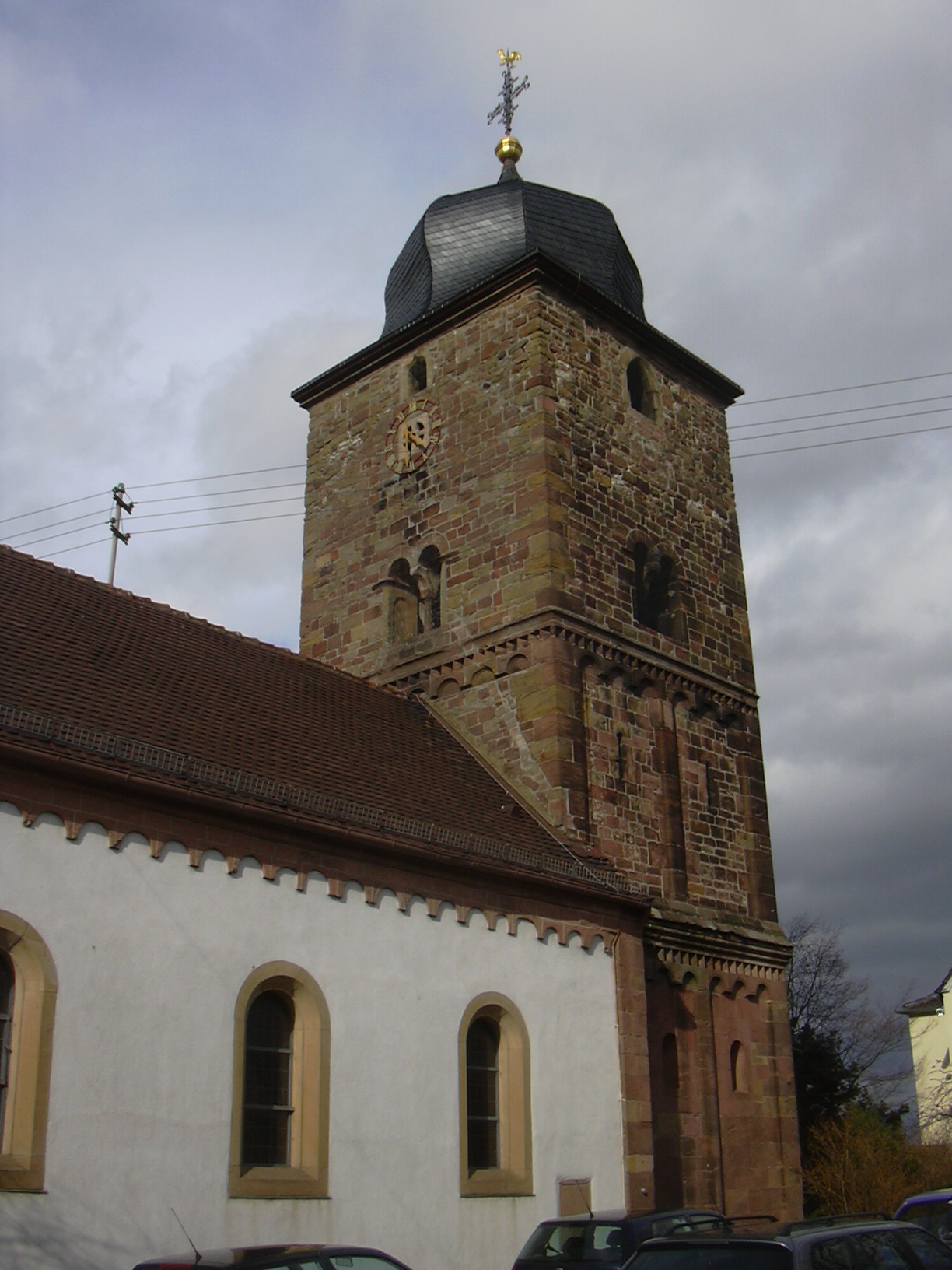
St. Mary's Parish Church

Dackenheim's arms might in English heraldic language be described thus: Gules on a mount vert, both vested, crined and crowned Or and nimbed argent, dexter Mary Mother of God holding the Christ Child on her dexter arm and sinister Saint Catherine, in her dexter hand a sword proper palewise, point on the mount, her sinister arm embowed, at their feet on the mount, surmounting the sword, a broken half wheel spoked of four of the field, in chief between the two crowns and nimbi a mullet of the third.

The two figures represent patron saints, Mary and Catherine, the latter with her attributes, the sword and the wheel, and the former with the baby Jesus. The mullet (star) likely stands for the local court. Although the arms were already in use by the early 20th century, they were not officially conferred until 13 April 1973. The design comes from the village's oldest known seal, from 1513.

== Culture and sightseeing ==
=== Buildings ===
The centre of this village that grew together from five monastic estates in the 12th century is its Catholic parish church St. Maria (“Saint Mary’s”). Beginning in 1147 it belonged to Höningen Abbey. Still bearing witness to this time are the Romanesque tower with its round-arch frieze on the ground floor and double arcades on the upper floor, and the apse whose back wall forms three sides of an octagon. The nave was renovated in the 18th and 19th centuries, at which time a relief of the Fall of Man from an earlier church building – possibly from the Tympanon Portal – was integrated into the gable.

In the single-nave interior, the chancel columns with their richly decorated capitals (palmettes, heads, seated figures) are likewise still Romanesque.

Beside the church is a small winemaker's fountain with a Bacchus figure.

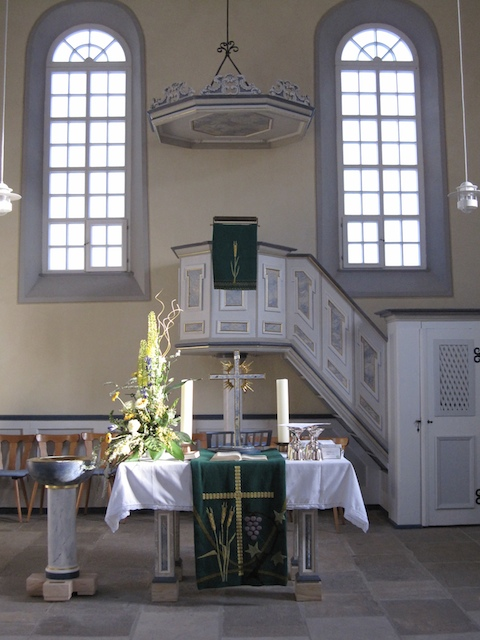
Dackenheim Protestant church: view of the inside with the altar, font and pulpit

Building work on the Protestant church began in 1716, after Electoral Palatinate once again had a Catholic Elector in Johann Wilhelm beginning in 1698 and the village's two denominations had to share the only church building. Finished in 1717, the Protestant church was converted into a gallery church, taking on its current form, a hall church with a gallery and a ridge turret with an eight-sided belfry and an onion-shaped cupola. On the south wall are found the altar table and the pulpit, which is reached by a stairway from the trellised minister's chair. The organ was built in 1875 by E.F.Walcker & Cie.

=== Golf ===
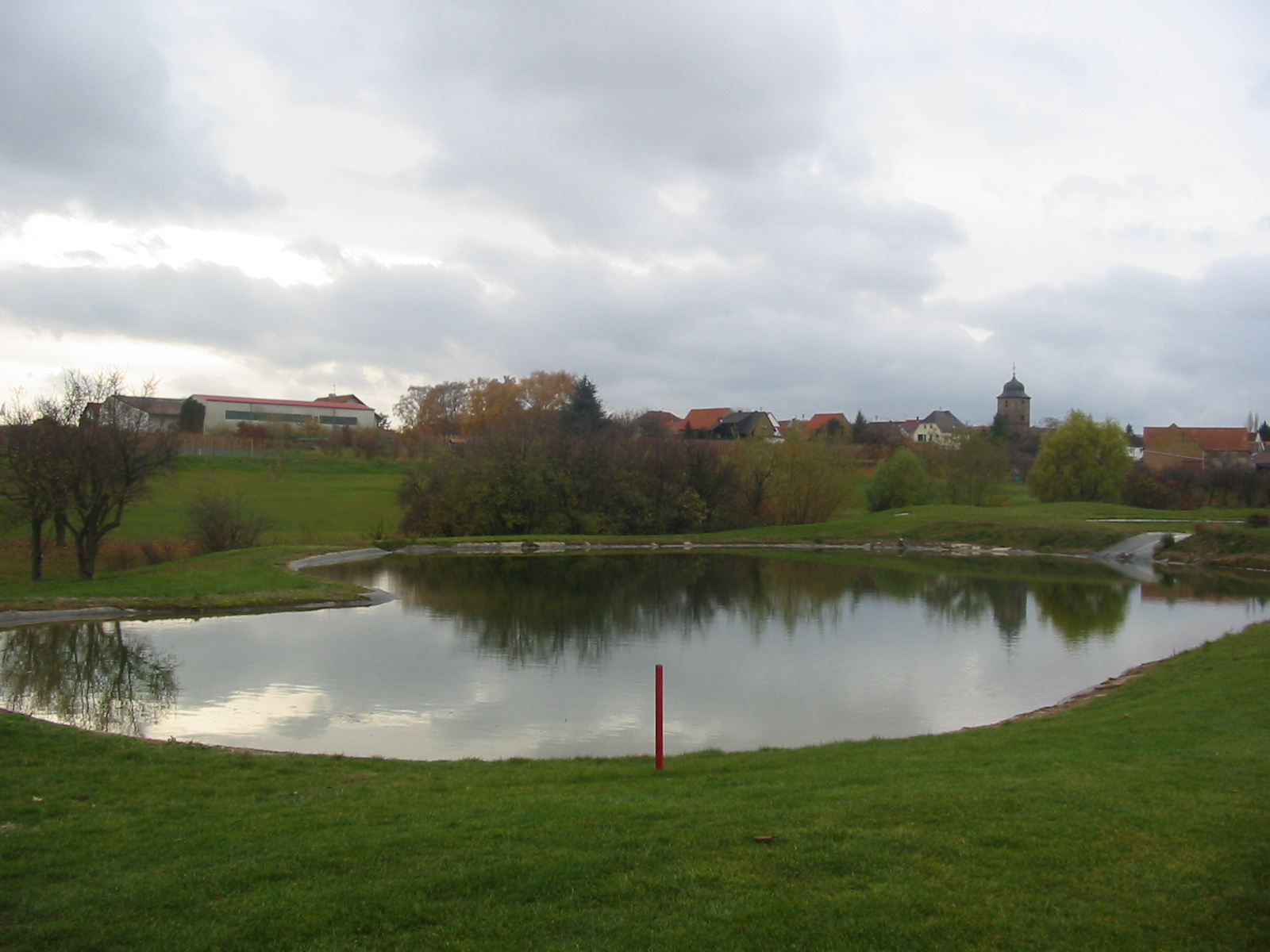
First hole with water hazard and a view of Dackenheim

With its golf course, built in 1995 on Dackenheim's eastern outskirts and expanded to 27 holes in 2005, the municipality has a further leisure incentive beyond its traditional perception as a winegrowing centre.

The complex is in a league with seven others in Frankfurt Rhine Main Region, the Palatinate and the Saarland as part of the so-called Rotationsgolf concept of the Mannheim golf course designer and investor Dr. Hermann Weiland.

In collaboration with the Mainz State Institute for Plantraising and Plant Protection (Mainzer Landesanstalt für Pflanzenbau und Pflanzenschutz), more than 2,000 grapevines and fruit trees have been planted on the golf course lands. This educational path – it is called the Golfgarten – is laid out in such a way that the first 18 holes are named after the grape varieties that surround them, and the 19th to 27th holes are likewise named after the fruits found near them. According to the course’s own advertising material, both players and hikers outside the playing area may try the fruits free.

== Economy and infrastructure ==
=== Winegrowing ===
In the vineyards of the Dackesheimer Liebesbrunnen appellation, it is mainly Riesling, Gewürztraminer, Silvaner and Pinot noir that are grown, but there are also Scheurebe, Kerner, Pinot blanc and Pinot gris, along with rarer varieties such as Blaufränkisch or St. Laurent. There are also small testing grounds for new varieties. Grapes grown here are to a great extent dry-wine varieties, although there are also demi-sec and sweeter varieties. They ripen partly traditionally in barriques and other oaken casks. Several family-owned wineries and winemakers’ coöperatives openly sell their wares in the municipality at wine tastings. Individual wines are given awards in different years.

Mandelröth, whose mainstay is Chardonnay and Kapellengarten are two smaller appellations in Dackenheim.

=== Transport ===
One main street leads from Bundesstraße 271 (the German Wine Route “proper”) through the middle of the village and by the church, and onwards another 3 km to Freinsheim. Branching off the thoroughfare are little laneways with houses, farms and wineries.
