= Joseph Echteler =

German sculptor

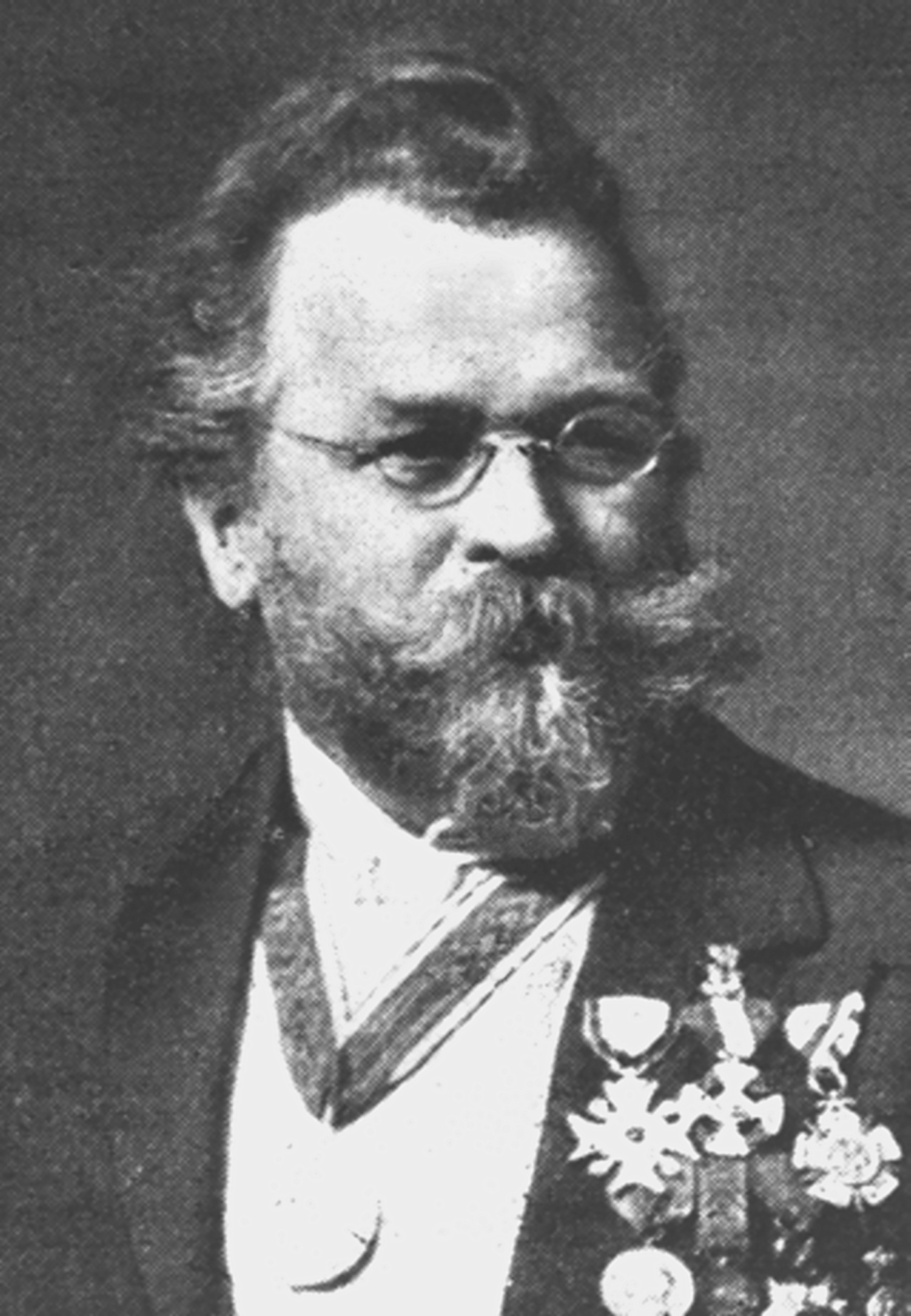
Joseph Echteler (1908)

Joseph Anton Echteler (5 January 1853 in Legau – 23 December 1908 in Mainz) was a German sculptor.

== Biography ==
Echteler was the son of the economist and baker Leonhard Echteler und Marianna von Sandholz. After tending sheep and cattle up to age twelve, he learned the craft of stonemasonry, carving, stuccowork and sculpting at a chiseler in Leutkirch im Allgäu. As a wandering journeyman he came to Stuttgart, where he visited the fine arts school. From November 1872 he continued his artistic education at the Academy of Fine Arts in Munich under Max von Widnmann and Joseph Knabl.

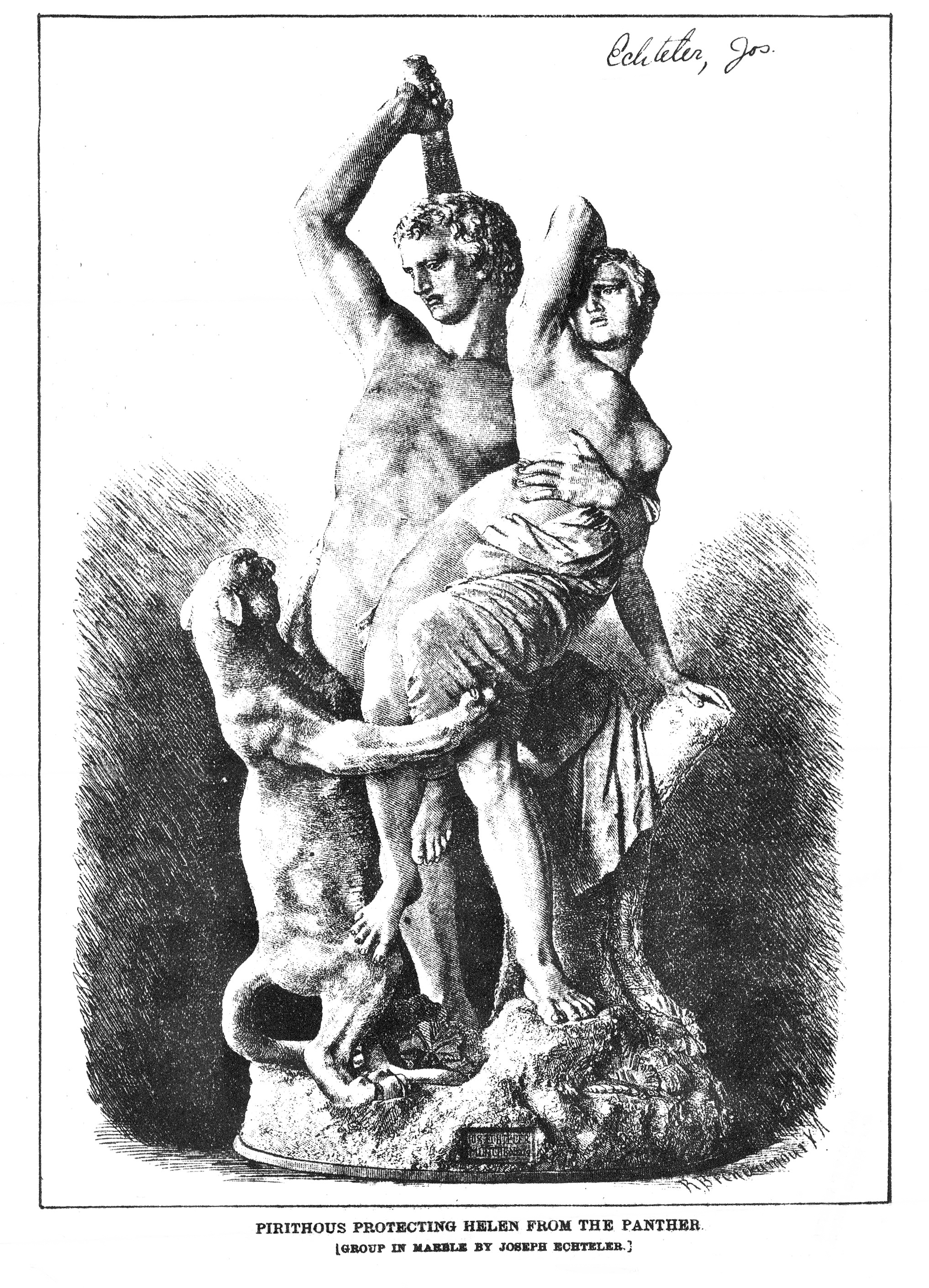
Pirithous' fight for Helena. Woodcut by Richard Brend'amour after the sculpture by Joseph Echteler.

In Munich he first became known as a portrait artist who created medallions, reliefs and busts of famous stage artists, singers, artists, scholars, councillors, church dignitaries, diplomats, and royalty, after photographs. His work impressed by their great lifelikeness and careful execution. Soon he also executed tomb sculptures, religious and mythological sculptures, animals and group works.

In May 1884 Echteler left his Munich studio and moved together with his family to the U.S. where he worked primarily as a portrait artist. After President Grant died in 1885, it was decided to erect a monument and mausoleum to his memory in New York City. Echteler worked out and submitted a design, which was among the finalists in February 1887. He did not win the contest for the memorial however. In Autumn 1887 he returned to Munich. He created busts and badges of Europe's highest royalty and received numerous honors and awards. His total work comprises about 200 busts, among these Emperor Wilhelm, Franz Joseph, Alexander II and the kings of Bavaria and Württemberg.

Echteler was awarded the honorary title professor by Heinrich XXII, Prince Reuss of Greiz for his artistic work. As the Kingdom of Bavaria would not at first permit him to use the title because of its origin, the artist's complaints nearly led to a diplomatic crisis between Bavaria and the Principality of Reuss-Greiz in 1899. The matter was resolved by Echteler changing his citizenship to that of the Principality, which made it legally possible for him to use the title professor.

Among Echteler's best known students is Emil von Schlitz.

== Marriages and children ==
Echteler, born a Catholic was married three times. His first wife Dorathea, a Catholic (née Seybold born in Munich 28 November 1858) bore him three daughters. Joseph, Dora and Marie traveled from Munich to NYC 1884, then moved to Hoboken NJ 1885-1887, where Olga was born. They returned to Munich autumn 1887 where Ida was born. Their fourth child, a long-awaited boy, was born dead (stillborn) late 1889 in Munich. Joseph's grief consumed him, losing his only born son. Joseph on 2 February 1890, sent Dora and their daughters Marie (born in Munich September 1878), Olga (born in Hoboken, New Jersey, USA August 1886) and Eda (born in Munich, July 1888) to America, with their understanding Joseph's design won the honor of him sculpting Grant's Tomb in NYC. Joseph never joined them, but sent his family under a pretext, then annulled his first Catholic marriage and married a divorced Protestant. His second wife was Elisabeth Fuchs (née Geret); they married 24 April 1890 and divorced 27 September 1904. Echteler married Anna Kramer a Protestant (née Nikolai, a widow) 18 November 1905.

== Works (selection) ==
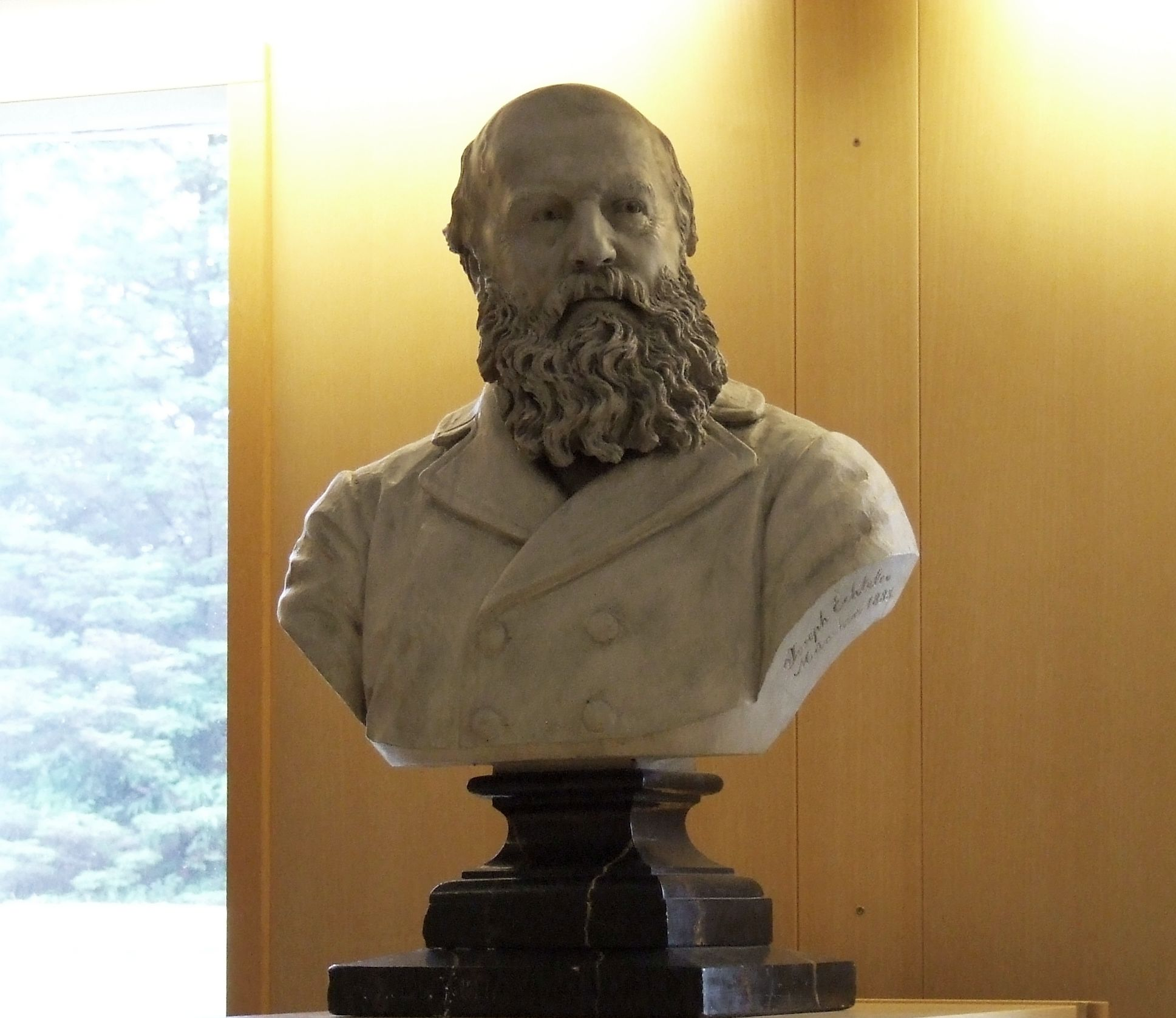
Bust of Konrad Maurer, 1888, today in the National and University Library of Iceland

- Mater dolorosa
- Ecce homo
- Madonna
- Group after Walther von der Vogelweide
- Waisenschutz (group)
- Knabe mit Hund und Taube
- Pirithous' Kampf um Helena (colossal group in marble/bronze)
- Der Kampf um seinen Liebling
- Venus sich mit Rosen schmückend
- Herkules im Kampf mit dem Nemëischen Löwen
- Amazonenkämpfe zu Pferd
- Fürst von Sayn-Wittgenstein (portrait bust commissioned by the Tsar of Russia)
- 1875 Johann Nepomuk von Nußbaum (portrait bust)
- 1881 Venus mit dem gezähmten Löwen
- 1881 Herakles nimmt der Amazonenkönigin Hipolyte das Wehrgehänge ab
- 1881 Antiope und Theseus
- 1883 Ignaz von Döllinger (portrait bust)
- 1883–84 Charles Darwin (portrait bust, Metropolitan Museum of Art)
- 1884 Mrs. Frank Leslie (portrait bust)
- 1888 Konrad Maurer (portrait bust, National and University Library of Iceland)

== Other ==
Echteler was also a dog breeder and connoisseur. One of his dogs, the St. Bernard Bayard (Barry), saved 37 lives from water and fire and was a direct descendant of the famous Swiss avalanche dog Barry. The New York Times reported in 1884 that Echteler presented Barry at the Westminster dog show in New York.

The German obituary mentions that Echteler, who was a swimmer and a member of the Munich Jahn gymnastics club, “courageously saved young lives from the water” three times, even at the risk of his life.

Since a head injury caused by a horse's hoof in 1889 (possibly frontal lobe damage ), Echteler's personality had changed: since then he was very irritable and sensitive to noise. The accident is also clearly visible in the change in his handwriting. In Munich, he got into neighborly disputes with lawsuits and lawsuits, which is why he moved to his third wife's hometown of Mainz in 1908. He died there two months later at the age of 55.

== Literature ==
- Hermann Alexander Müller: Biographisches Künstler-Lexikon, pages 108f. Leipzig 1908
- Ulrich Thieme, Felix Becker et al.: Allgemeines Lexikon der Bildenden Künstler von der Antike bis zur Gegenwart, page 313. Leipzig 1914
- Brockhaus' Kleines Konversations-Lexikon, fifth edition of 1911
- Brockhaus' Konversations-Lexikon, volume 17, page 350
- Echteler's register entry at the Munich Academy of Fine Arts
- Dr. Hermann Alex. Müller, Biographisches Künstler-Lexikon, page 153, Verlag des Bibliographischen Instituts, Leipzig, 1882
- B. Volger: Deutschlands, Österreich-Ungarns und der Schweiz Gelehrte, Künstler und Schriftsteller in Wort und Bild, 1908, page 103
- Herrmann A. L. Degener: Wer ist's?, 1905, page 298. Volume 4 of 1908, page 308
