= Konrad Maurer =

German legal historian

- Born: Konrad Maurer; 29 April 1823
- Died: 6 September 1902 (aged 79)

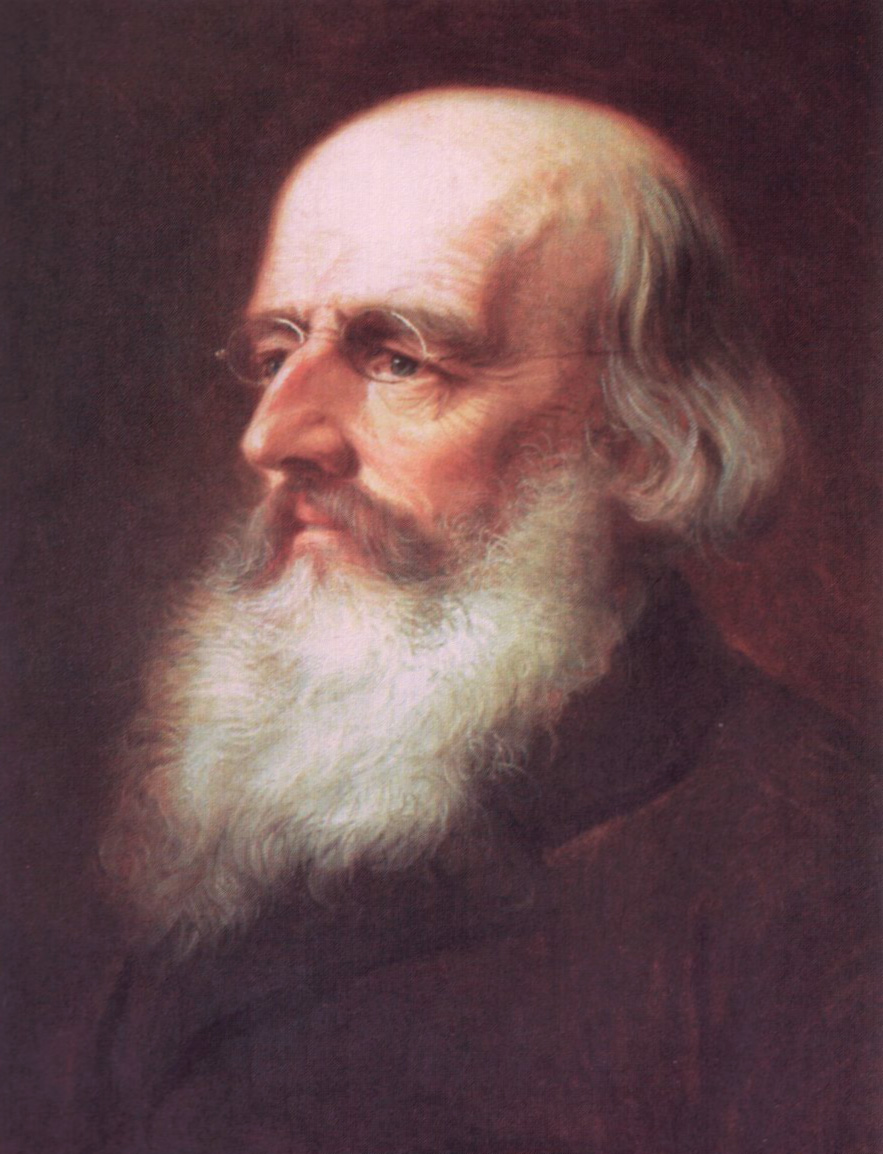
Konrad Maurer, painting by Knud Bergslien (1876), today in the University of Oslo.

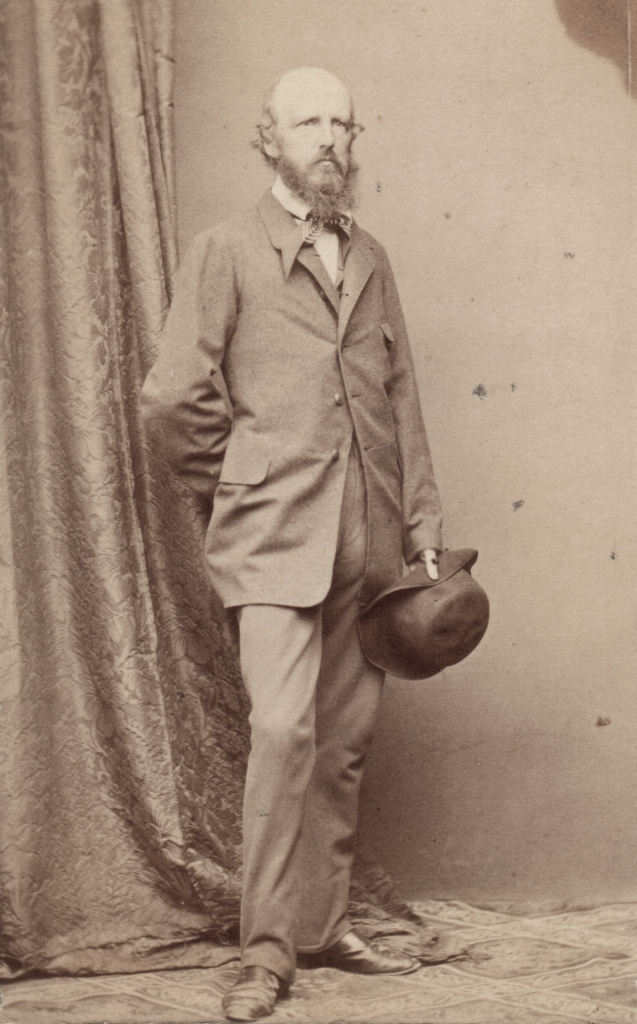
Photograph of Konrad Maurer

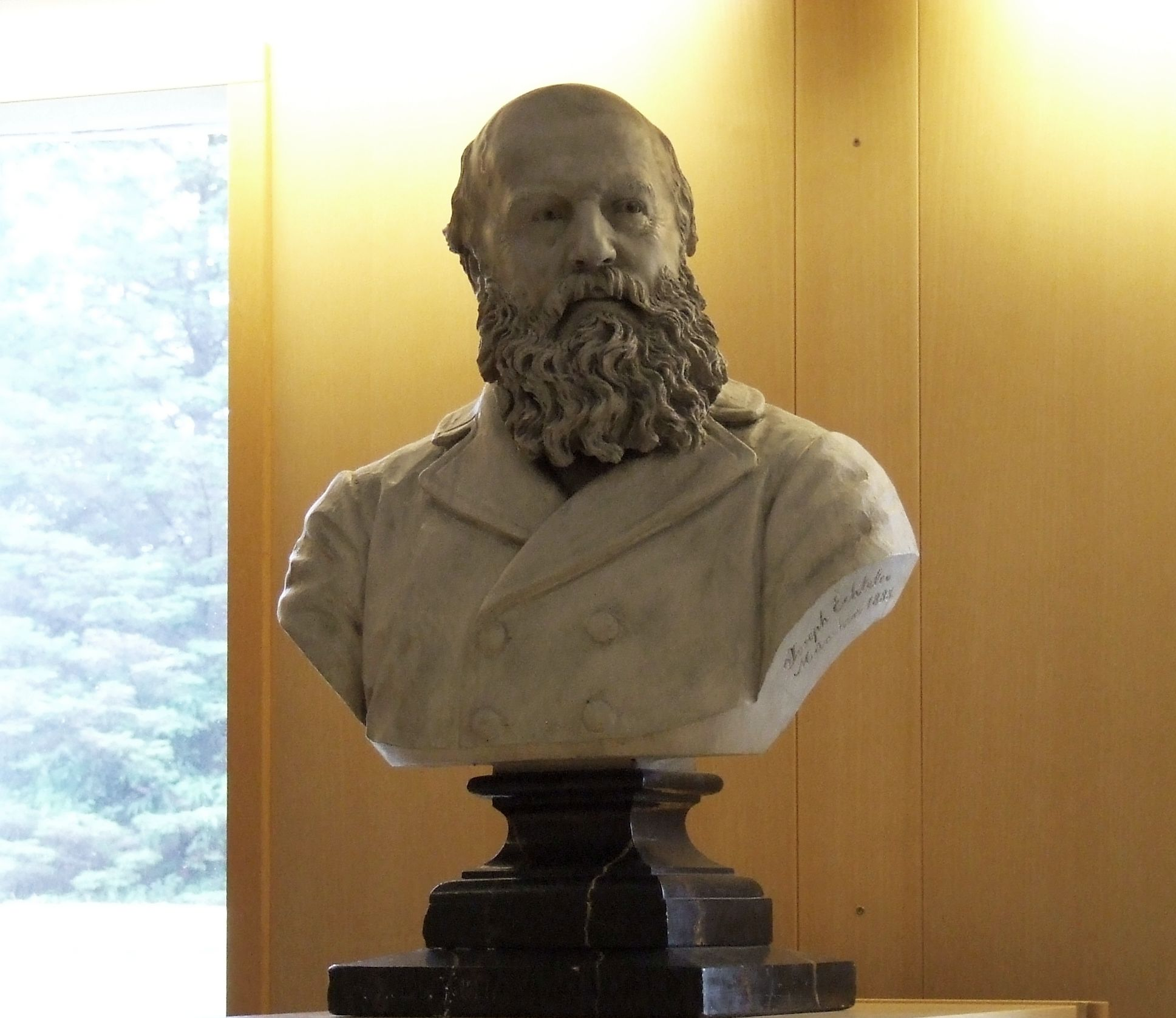
Bust of Konrad Maurer by the sculptor Joseph Echteler (1888), today in the National and University Library of Iceland

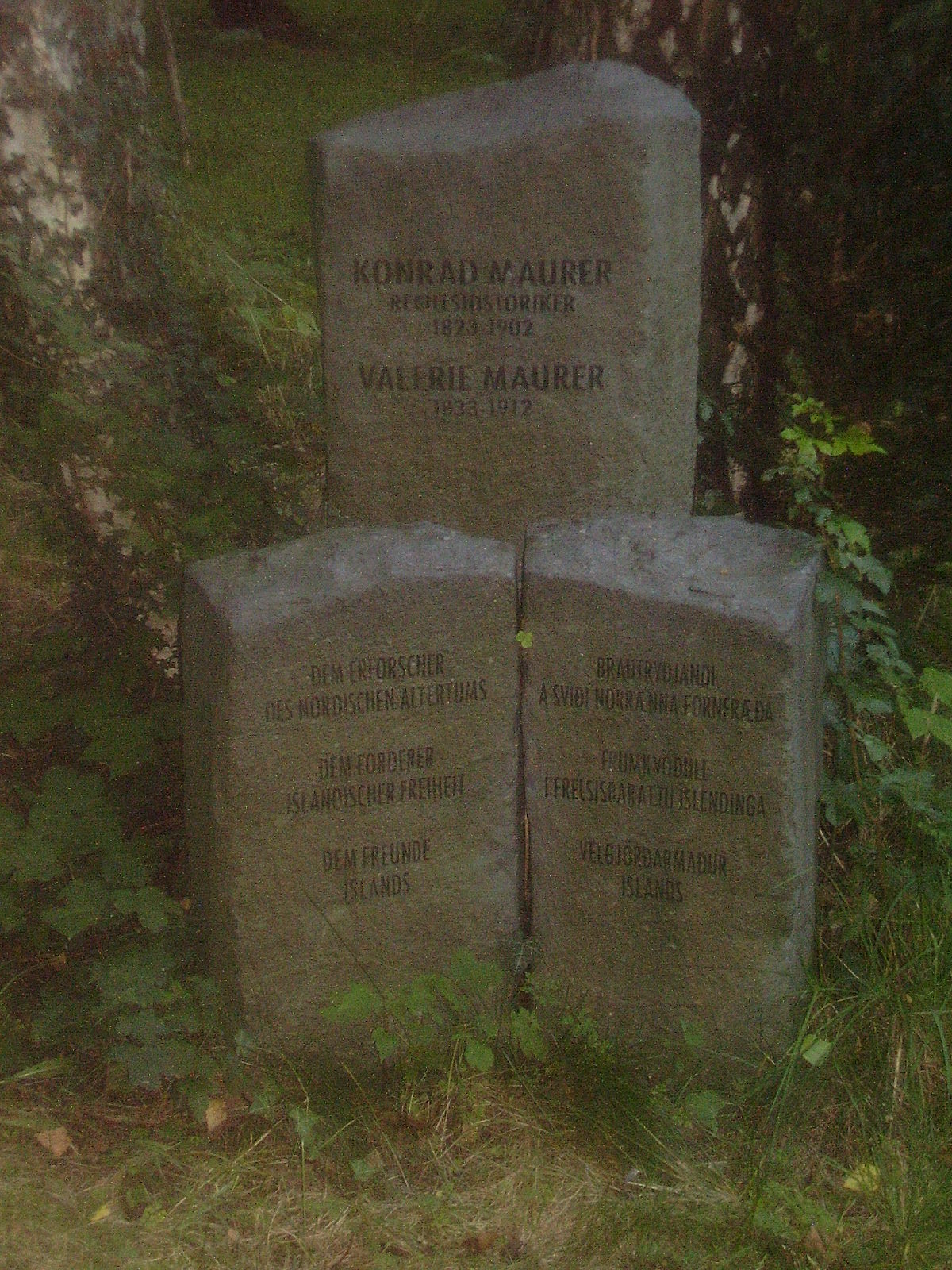
Konrad Maurer's grave in Munich

Konrad Maurer, since 1876 Konrad von Maurer (29 April 1823 – 16 September 1902) was a German legal historian. He was the son of legal historian and statesman Georg Ludwig von Maurer (1790–1872). Maurer is considered one of the most significant researchers of Nordic legal and constitutional history.

== Biography ==
Konrad Heinrich Maurer was born in 1823 in Frankenthal (Palatinate), as the only son of Georg Ludwig von Maurer und Friederike Maurer née Heydweiller. In 1826, the family moved to Munich (Bavaria), where his father was appointed professor of German legal history. Here, Konrad Maurer's mother died when he was seven. His father never remarried. Konrad Maurer spent two years of his childhood in Greece where his father was appointed a member of the council of regency of king Otto of Greece. Afterwards the family returned to Munich.

Bowing to his father's wish, Konrad Maurer studied law at the Ludwig-Maximilians-Universität München, Leipzig University, and the Friedrich Wilhelm University of Berlin, earning his doctorate in 1845. In 1847, he became an associate professor, and in 1855 a full professor of legal history at the Ludwig-Maximilians-Universität München.

Maurer was a leading authority of Germanic and Nordic legal and constitutional history. He had a special interest in Icelandic literature, history, language and culture and was an outspoken advocate for Icelandic political independence from Danish rule, supporting Jón Sigurðsson in his cause.

In 1858, Maurer undertook personal travel to Iceland. Inspired by his contacts to Jacob Grimm (from the Brothers Grimm), he used the opportunity to collect Icelandic folk tales and published them after his return under the title Isländische Volkssagen der Gegenwart. This was the first detailed publication of Icelandic folk tales in German.

Maurer read lectures at the Ludwig-Maximilians-Universität München, the University of Oslo, and the University of Copenhagen. In 1865, he was appointed a member of the Bavarian Academy of Sciences and Humanities, and in 1876, he was awarded (nonhereditary) knighthood of the Merit Order of the Bavarian Crown. By this he was officially given the title "(Ritter) von Maurer"; however he did not like the title and always preferred to be called just Maurer. In the same year, Maurer was offered his own chair at the University of Christiania, which he declined.

Throughout his life Maurer was a close friend to the Icelandic scholar Guðbrandur Vigfússon, the Norwegian folklorist Peter Christen Asbjørnsen, playwright Henrik Ibsen and writer Bjørnstjerne Bjørnson. He retired in 1888 and died 1902 in Munich, where he was buried in Alter Südfriedhof. His considerable library, which he had inherited from his father and expanded to over 9000 volumes, was sold in 1904, for the major part to Harvard University and the rest to the bar association of New York. A part of it is today in the libraries of Yale Law School and George Washington University Law School.

Maurer had eight children. His eldest son Ludwig Maurer became a mathematician.

== Awards ==
- 1865 member of the Bavarian Academy of Sciences and Humanities
- 1876 knight of the Merit Order of the Bavarian Crown
- 1876 honorary doctor of University of Christiania
- 1882 honorary doctor of University of Edinburgh
- 1882 honorary doctor of University of Würzburg
- Knight 1st Class of the Order of St. Michael
- Knight of the Bayerischer Maximiliansorden für Wissenschaft und Kunst
- Honorary Cross of the Ludwigsorden (Bavaria)
- Knight Grand Cross of the Royal Norwegian Order of St. Olav (Norway)
- Commander First Class of the Order of the Polar Star (Sweden)
- Commander First Class of the Order of the Dannebrog (Denmark)

== Konrad Maurer societies ==
On 18 September 2016, the German non-profit society Konrad-Maurer-Gesellschaft e. V. was founded in Munich, with the aim to keep the memory of the scholar and person Konrad Maurer alive and to continue his work. On 21 February 2019, the Icelandic Konrad Maurer society Konrad Maurer Félag á Íslandi was founded in Reykjavík.

== Selected publications ==
- Ueber das Wesen des ältesten Adels der deutschen Stämme in seinem Verhältniß zur gemeinen Freiheit, 1846.
- Die Bekehrung des Norwegischen Stammes zum Christenthume, in ihrem geschichtlichen Verlaufe quellenmäßig geschildert, 1855/56.
- Die Gull-Þóris Saga oder Þorskfirðínga Saga, 1858.
- Isländische Volkssagen der Gegenwart. Vorwiegend nach mündlicher Überlieferung gesammelt und verdeutscht (Icelandic Folk Tales of the Present, Chiefly Collected through Oral Tradition/German text only; Open Library free edition), 1860.
- Island, von seiner ersten Entdeckung bis zum Untergange des Freistaats, 1874.
- Vorlesungen über altnordische Rechtsgeschichte (Lectures on Old Norse legal history), 5 volumes, 1907-1910 (posthumous).
- Konrad Maurer: Briefe an Philologen. Bd. 1:1846-1889. Bd. 2:1890-1900. Hrsg. u. eingel. v. Hans Fix. Saarbrücken 2024, ISBN 978-3-942701-62-4.
