= Freinsheim (Verbandsgemeinde) =

- Verbandsgemeinde
- Coat of arms

- Location of Freinsheim within Bad Dürkheim district
- Interactive map of Freinsheim
- Location within Germany Location within Rhineland-Palatinate
- Coordinates: 49°30′N 8°12′E
- Country: Germany
- State: Rhineland-Palatinate
- District: Bad Dürkheim
- Seat: Freinsheim
- Subdivisions: 8 municipalities

Area
  - Total: 60.71 km^{2} (23.44 sq mi)

Population (2025-12-31)
  - Total: 15,184
  - Density: 250.1/km^{2} (647.8/sq mi)
- Time zone: UTC+01:00 (CET)
  - Summer (DST): UTC+02:00 (CEST)
- Website: www.vg-freinsheim.de

Freinsheim is a Verbandsgemeinde ("collective municipality") in the district of Bad Dürkheim, Rhineland-Palatinate, Germany. The seat of the Verbandsgemeinde is in Freinsheim.

The Verbandsgemeinde Freinsheim consists of the following Ortsgemeinden ("local municipalities"):

1. Bobenheim am Berg
2. Dackenheim
3. Erpolzheim
4. Freinsheim
5. Herxheim am Berg
6. Kallstadt
7. Weisenheim am Berg
8. Weisenheim am Sand
