= Georg Ernst Hinzpeter =

German educationist (1827–1907)

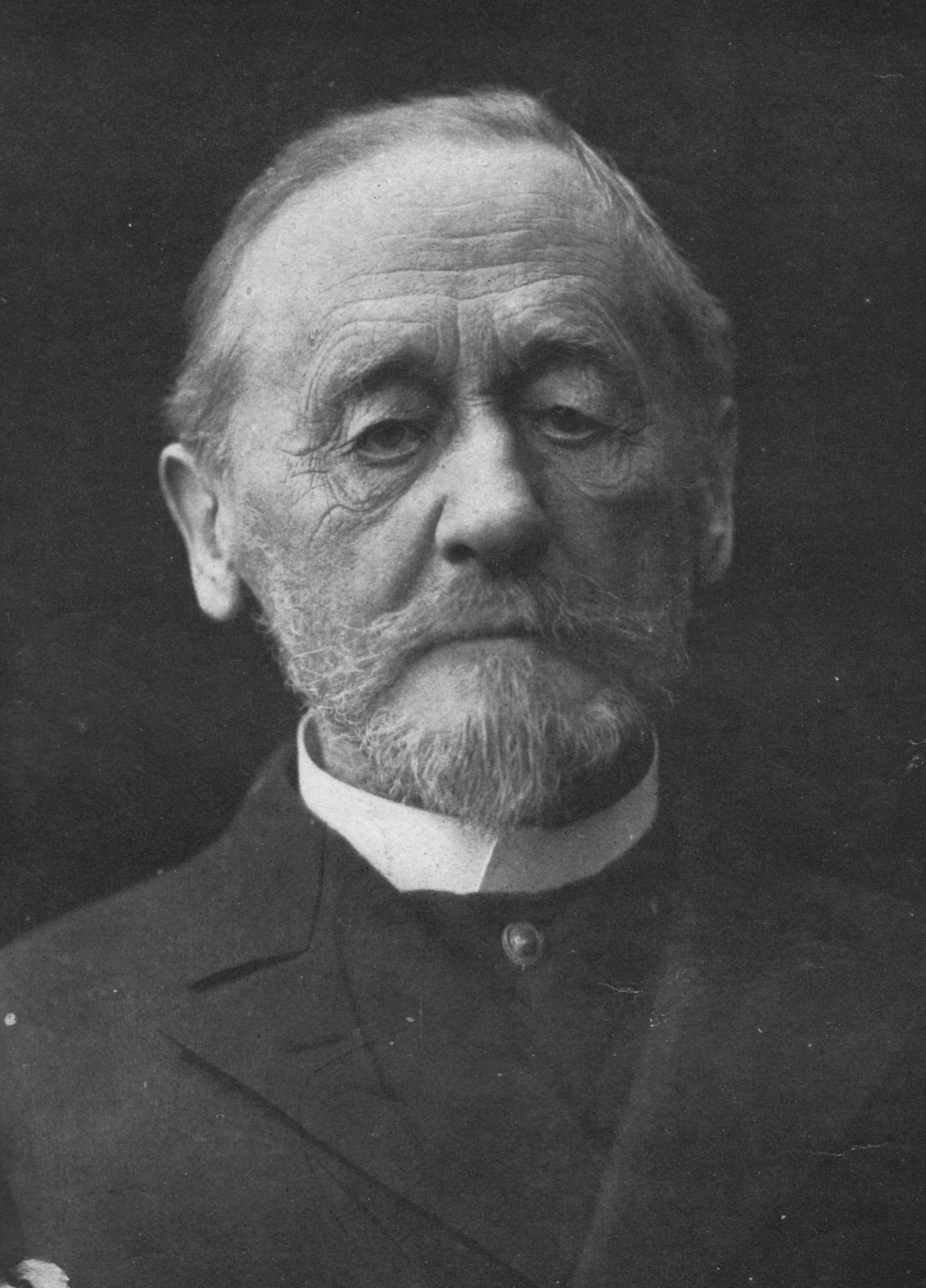
Georg Ernst Hinzpeter (c.1907)

Georg Ernst Hinzpeter (9 October 1827, Gelsenkirchen - 28 December 1907, Bielefeld) was a German pedagogue.

== Biography ==
His father was a gymnasium teacher. After completing his primary education, he studied in Halle and Berlin, majoring in philosophy and classical philology. He graduated with a Doctoral degree in both subjects. His first position was as a tutor for the Wittgenstein family; then for the family of Count Karl von Schlitz. After that, he spent a few years teaching at the Ratsgymnasium Bielefeld. In 1866, he was appointed tutor to Prince (later Kaiser) Wilhelm and his brothers. In 1875, he married Octavie Darcourt, the Prince's French teacher.

He held his position until the Prince came of age. This was the first time an heir to the throne had not been tutored by the traditional military educator; an innovation that was strictly enforced by the Prince's mother, Crown Princess Victoria. She also saw Hinzpeter's strict methods as a way of compensating for Wilhelm's physical handicap which, to her, was a major deficit. His drastic approach, by modern standards, was based on Calvinism, mortification of the flesh, and the denial of pleasure. It may have been a significant factor in creating the future Kaiser's unpleasant personality.

After Wilhelm came to power in 1888, Hinzpeter was appointed as a personal advisor and secret government councilor. In 1891, he was a candidate to succeed Gustav von Goßler as Minister of Culture. From 1904, he was a member of the Prussian House of Lords. The Kaiser was in attendance at his funeral.
