= Karl von Schlitz =

German politician and Standesherr in the Grand Duchy of Hesse

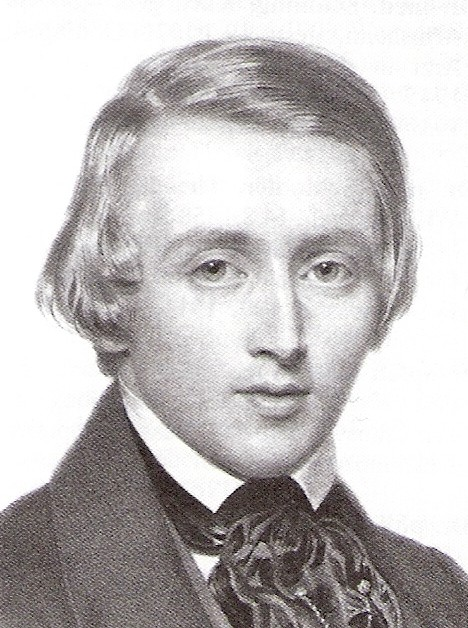
Karl von Schlitz; from the Hessisches Staatsarchiv Darmstadt

Count Karl von Schlitz, in full: Karl Heinrich Wilhelm Hermann Ferdinand von Schlitz, genannt von Görtz (15 February 1822, Schlitz - 7 December 1885, Schlitz) was a German politician and Standesherr in the Grand Duchy of Hesse.

== Life ==
He acceded to the Standesherrschaft in 1839, at the age of seventeen, then went to Bonn, where he studied jurisprudence and graduated with a Doctoral degree in law. He had also studied ancient languages, which enabled him to assist Otto von Böhtlingk with his translation of Shakuntala by Kālidāsa From 1844 to 1847, he made a trip around the world; publishing his observations and experiences in a three-volume set. From 1850 to 1861 and again from 1864 to 1866, he was Hesse's Ambassador to the Prussian Court.

As a Hessian nobleman, he was a hereditary member of the Upper Chamber of the Landstände des Großherzogtums Hessen. During the revolutions of 1848, he was a member of the Vorparlaments. After the March Revolution, his hereditary positions were lost, but they were later regained and he once again served in the Upper Chamber from 1856 until his death. He was its vice-president from 1866 to 1875, and its president from 1875 to 1885.

His son Emil, who was a sculptor by profession, followed in his father's footsteps and served as President of the Upper Chamber from 1900 to 1914.
