= Weisenheim am Sand =

- Municipality
- Coat of arms

- Location of Weisenheim am Sand within Bad Dürkheim district
- Interactive map of Weisenheim am Sand
- Location within Germany Location within Rhineland-Palatinate
- Coordinates: 49°31′05″N 08°14′52″E
- Country: Germany
- State: Rhineland-Palatinate
- District: Bad Dürkheim
- Municipal assoc.: Freinsheim

Government
  - Mayor (2019–24): Michael Johannes Bähr (CDU)

Area
  - Total: 13.72 km^{2} (5.30 sq mi)
- Elevation: 98 m (322 ft)

Population (2025-12-31)
  - Total: 4,131
  - Density: 301.1/km^{2} (779.8/sq mi)
- Time zone: UTC+01:00 (CET)
  - Summer (DST): UTC+02:00 (CEST)
- Postal codes: 67256
- Dialling codes: 06353
- Vehicle registration: DÜW
- Website: www.weisenheimamsand.de

Weisenheim am Sand (Palatine German: Weisrem) is an Ortsgemeinde – a municipality belonging to a Verbandsgemeinde, a kind of collective municipality – in the Bad Dürkheim district in Rhineland-Palatinate, Germany.

== Geography ==
=== Location ===
Weisenheim am Sand lies in the Upper Rhine Plain in the Eastern Palatinate (Vorderpfalz). Through Weisenheim flows the Fuchsbach, which empties into the Isenach in Frankenthal. Within the village's limits is the neighbouring recreational area “Käschdeberg”. By both land area and population, Weisenheim am Sand is the biggest village in the Verbandsgemeinde of Freinsheim (whose seat is in the like-named town), to which the smaller municipality of Weisenheim am Berg also belongs.

=== Climate ===
The area around Weisenheim is believed to be one of Germany's mildest regions and is particularly suited to winegrowing and fruitgrowing.

== History ==
Friedrich Schiller got his silver sand from Weisenheim to dry his ink.

== Politics ==
=== Municipal council ===
The council is made up of 20 council members, who were elected at the municipal election held on 7 June 2009, and the honorary mayor as chairman.

The municipal election held on 7 June 2009 yielded the following results:

	SPD	CDU	FDP	GRÜNE	FWG	Total
2009	5	8	3	1	3	20 seats
2004	6	9	2	1	2	20 seats

=== Mayor ===
The mayor is Michael Johannes Bähr (CDU).

=== Coat of arms ===
The German blazon reads: In Rot ein aufrecht gestellter goldener Palmzweig, beseitet von zwei sechsstrahligen goldenen Sternen.

The municipality's arms might in English heraldic language be described thus: Gules a palm frond palewise, the leaves bendwise sinister, between two mullets of six, all Or.

The arms go back to the village's oldest known seal, from 1474. The palm frond stands for Saint Cyriacus, the local patron, but what the mullets (star shapes) mean is unknown. The arms have been borne since 1922 but were officially granted only on 19 August 1957.

=== Town partnerships ===
Weisenheim am Sand fosters partnerships with the following places:

- (Germany) Niederroßla, Weimarer Land, Thuringia since 20 April 1991

== Culture and sightseeing ==
=== Education, sport and leisure ===
Weisenheim has three kindergartens and a primary school with four levels each with two classes. To the school belongs the community gymnasium. The municipal library, meanwhile, has moved from the town hall to the ground floor of the primary school.

The biggest sport club is SV Weisenheim am Sand. Other sport clubs are ASV Weisenheim am Sand, Tennis-Club Ludwigshain (TCL) and the Schützengilde Weisenheim am Sand (“Marksmen’s Guild”). Among other clubs are the Reit-und Fahrverein Weisenheim (riding and driving), the volunteer fire brigade's promotional club, the local history and museum club and several Fastnacht groups.

== Famous people ==
Living in Weisenheim are the Austrian competition horseman Hugo Simon, who in 1996 was the world's "most successful show jumper", and also the former FIFA referee and now Südwestdeutscher Fußballverband ("Southwest German Football League") functionary Werner Föckler (b. 24 June 1945).
