= Bobenheim am Berg =

- Municipality
- Coat of arms

- Location of Bobenheim am Berg within Bad Dürkheim district
- Interactive map of Bobenheim am Berg
- Location within Germany Location within Rhineland-Palatinate
- Coordinates: 49°31′27″N 8°8′54″E
- Country: Germany
- State: Rhineland-Palatinate
- District: Bad Dürkheim
- Municipal assoc.: Freinsheim

Government
  - Mayor (2019–24): Dietmar Leist (CDU)

Area
  - Total: 6.33 km^{2} (2.44 sq mi)
- Elevation: 196 m (643 ft)

Population (2025-12-31)
  - Total: 786
  - Density: 124/km^{2} (322/sq mi)
- Time zone: UTC+01:00 (CET)
  - Summer (DST): UTC+02:00 (CEST)
- Postal codes: 67273
- Dialling codes: 06353
- Vehicle registration: DÜW
- Website: www.bobenheim-am-berg.de

Bobenheim am Berg is an Ortsgemeinde – a municipality belonging to a Verbandsgemeinde, a kind of collective municipality – in the Bad Dürkheim district in Rhineland-Palatinate, Germany.

== Geography ==
=== Location ===
The municipality lies in the Palatinate and is part of the Rhine-Neckar urban agglomeration. Bobenheim am Berg belongs to the Verbandsgemeinde of Freinsheim, whose seat is in the like-named town.

== Demographics ==
=== Religion ===
In 2007, 43.5% of the inhabitants were Evangelical and 30.9% Catholic. Those professing another religious affiliation, or none, amount to 25.6%.

== Politics ==
=== Municipal council ===
The council is made up of 12 council members, who were elected at the municipal election held on 7 June 2009, and the honorary mayor as chairman.

The municipal election held on 7 June 2009 yielded the following results:

	SPD	CDU	FWG	Total
2009	3	6	3	12 seats
2004	3	7	2	12 seats

=== Coat of arms ===
The German blazon reads: In Gold ein schwarzes Gemarkungszeichen.

The last word refers to the unusual charge seen on the escutcheon, a “municipal area sign”. The municipality's arms might in English heraldic language be described thus: Or a bar and a saltire both couped, the arm in sinister chief crossed by a bendlet couped and the two arms in base conjoined by a chevron reversed sable.

The tinctures are the Palatine colours.

The arms were approved in 1983 by the now abolished Regierungsbezirk of Rheinhessen-Pfalz and date from a 1714 court seal.

== Culture and sightseeing ==
=== Regular events ===
Each year on the second weekend in August, the kermis (church consecration festival, locally known as the Kerwe) is held, and on the first weekend of Advent, the Belzenickelmarkt (“Father Christmas/Santa Claus Market”).

== Famous people ==
The Member of the Bundestag, Norbert Schindler, lives in Bobenheim am Berg.
