= Herxheim am Berg =

- Municipality
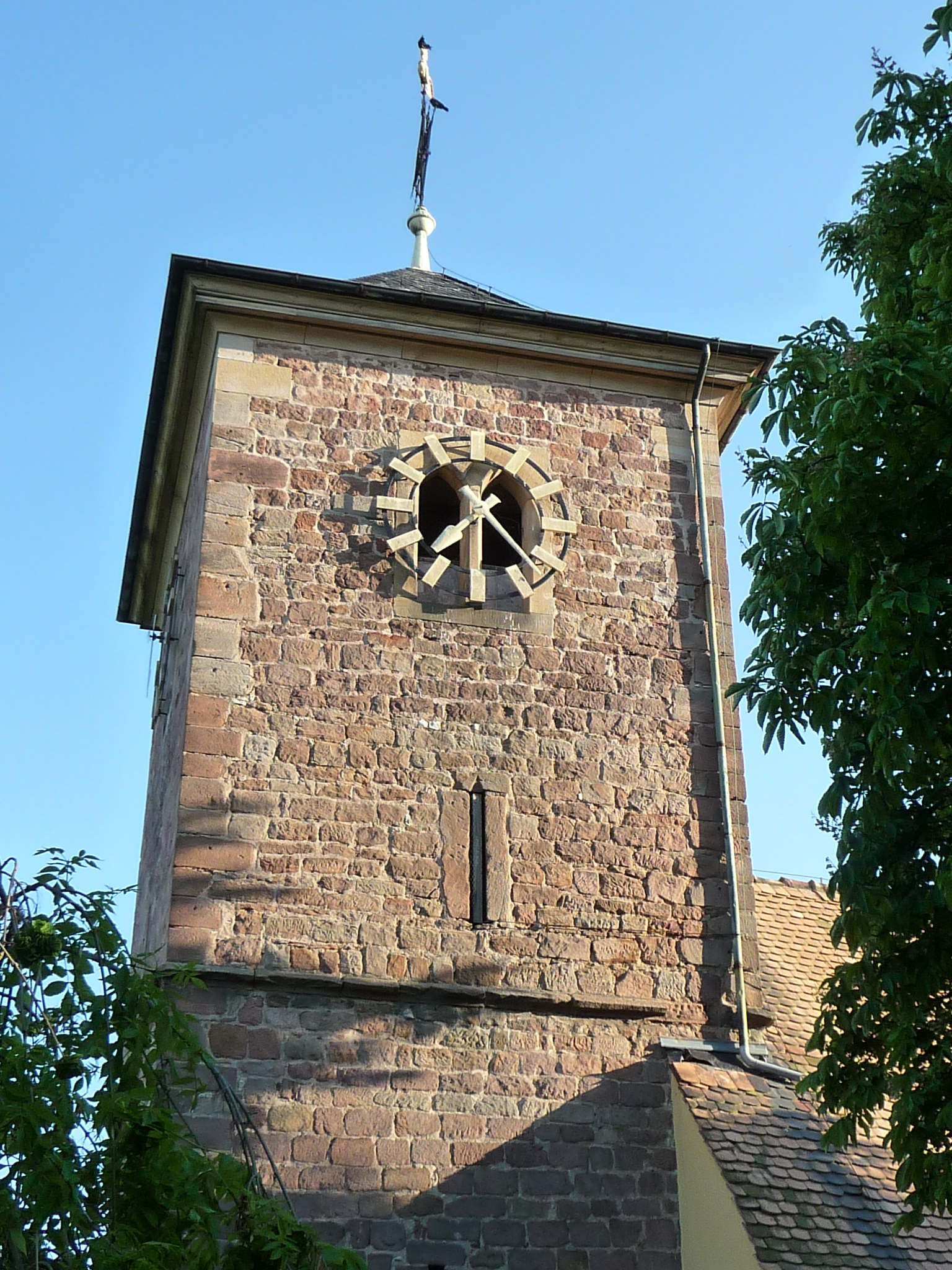
- The former Saint Jacob’s Church (St. Jakobskirche)

- Coat of arms

- Location of Herxheim am Berg within Bad Dürkheim district
- Interactive map of Herxheim am Berg
- Location within Germany Location within Rhineland-Palatinate
- Coordinates: 49°30′36″N 8°10′47″E
- Country: Germany
- State: Rhineland-Palatinate
- District: Bad Dürkheim
- Municipal assoc.: Freinsheim

Government
  - Mayor (2019–24): Georg Welker

Area
  - Total: 4.35 km^{2} (1.68 sq mi)
- Elevation: 137 m (449 ft)

Population (2025-12-31)
  - Total: 721
  - Density: 166/km^{2} (429/sq mi)
- Time zone: UTC+01:00 (CET)
  - Summer (DST): UTC+02:00 (CEST)
- Postal codes: 67273
- Dialling codes: 06353
- Vehicle registration: DÜW

Herxheim am Berg is an Ortsgemeinde – a municipality belonging to a Verbandsgemeinde, a kind of collective municipality – in the Bad Dürkheim district in Rhineland-Palatinate, Germany.

== Geography ==
=== Location ===
The municipality lies in the Palatinate on the German Wine Route. Herxheim am Berg belongs to the Verbandsgemeinde of Freinsheim, whose seat is in the like-named town.

== History ==
In 774, the municipality had its first documentary mention as Heriesheim.

The municipality's landmark is the roughly one-thousand-year-old Evangelical church of St Jacob (St. Jakobskirche). The building contains the lower section of a quire tower with a groin-vaulted chancel onto which is built a semicircular apse. The church was built about 1014, making it one of the Palatinate's oldest ecclesiastical buildings. The nave dates to 1729. In the chancel, wall paintings have been brought to light showing the Four Evangelists, both in human shape with wings and with the heads of their symbols. In the apse's vaulting there was a representation of the Last Judgement, and on the south wall, one can see the Apostle Paul. The paintings were done in the latter half of the 14th century.

The church tower contains a bell installed in 1934 and bearing a swastika and an inscription to Adolf Hitler. In 2018, after a complaint by the organist and an offer by the regional church organisation to replace the bell, the parish council voted to retain it as a memorial with an explanatory plaque.

== Politics ==
=== Municipal council ===
The council is made up of twelve councillors, elected for a five-year term of office, who were last elected at a local election on 25 May 2014. The chairman has the title of mayor.

The municipal elections of 2004, 2009, and 2014 yielded the following results:

	SPD	CDU	FDP	FWG	Total
2004	4	3	3	2	12 councillors
2009	5	3	2	2	12 councillors
2014	4	3	2	3	12 councillors

=== Coat of arms ===
The German blazon reads: In Rot auf grünem Dreiberg eine aufgerichtete silberne Hacke mit goldenem Stiel.

The municipality's arms might in English heraldic language be described thus: Gules issuant from a mount of three vert a hoe palewise argent with handle Or, the blade to dexter.

Herxheim's oldest village seal comes from about 1500 and already shows the hoe, whose meaning is unknown. The triple green mountains – a charge called a Dreiberg in German heraldry – may refer to the municipality's geographical location (the epithet “am Berg” means “at the mountain”). Some later seals had a different composition with the letter H between two roses, but when actual arms were adopted, the old composition was chosen.

The arms have been borne since 5 August 1960.

== Famous people ==
=== Sons and daughters of the town ===
- Herman Baer (1830-1901), American author
- Eduard Eppelsheimer (1808–1866), politician

=== Famous people associated with the municipality ===
- Werner Holz, painter
