= Palatine Northern Railway Company =

Railway company in Germany

The Palatine Northern Railways Company (Gesellschaft der Pfälzischen Nordbahnen) – abbreviated to Palatine Northern Railway (Pfälzer Nordbahn) - was founded on 17 April 1866 as the last of the three major private railway companies in the Bavarian province of the Palatinate.

From the outset it left the management and running of its railways to the Palatine Ludwigsbahn. Because the Ludwigsbahn company and the Palatine Maximilian Railway had already built their railway networks in central and southern Palatinate, the Palatine Northern Railway was only left with the region north of the line Ludwigshafen–Kaiserslautern–Homburg for its area of operations. It began working on 22 September 1868 with the opening of the 29 km long Landstuhl–Kusel railway: Landstuhl–Glan-Münchweiler–Altenglan–Kusel.

On 1 January 1870 as it agreed to merge with the other two Palatine railway organisations into the managerial and operating company of the United Palatine Railways, it also took over the entire shareholding of the Neustadt–Dürkheim Railway Company, whose railway line, opened in 1865, had been run by the Palatine Ludwigsbahn to that point in time.

The construction of the most important northern railway lines was then started:

- The Alsenz Valley Railway—Hochspeyer–Enkenbach–Langmeil–Winnweiler–Bad Münster (49 km)—ran on 29 October 1870 to Winnweiler and was completed on 16 May 1871. From Alsenz station a narrow gauge line branched off to Obermoschel (opened on 1 October 1903).
- The Zeller Valley Railway (opened 23 October 1872) ran from Marnheim to what became the Donnersbergbahn and enabled a link via Harxheim-Zell to the Rhine-Hessian hub at Monsheim.
- The Palatine Northern Railway from Neustadt an der Weinstraße, Dürkheim ran via Freinsheim–Grünstadt–Bockenheim–Kindenheim to Monsheim (22 km) along the present-day "wine road" (Weinstraße). On 15 October 1877 a cross-link from Freinsheim to Frankenthal (14 km) was added.
- The Donnersberg Railway—Langmeil–Marnheim–Kirchheimbolanden–Alzey (35 km)—appeared in 1873/74 and included the Kaiserslautern–Eselsfürth–Enkenbach section (13 km), which joined it on 15 May 1875.
- The Eis Valley Railway (opened 24 June 1876) ran from Grünstadt via Ebertsheim station to Eisenberg (9 km) with a branch from Ebertsheim Hp–Hettenleidelheim (4 km) opened in 1895.
- The Lauter Valley Railway (taken into service 15 November 1883)—Kaiserslautern–Wolfstein–Lauterecken-Grumbach (35 km)—was extended in 1896/97 in the Glan valley by 21 km from Meisenheim to Odernheim–Staudernheim and on 1 May 1904 on the right bank of the Nahe river from Odernheim to Bad Münster am Stein (16 km).
- On 15 September 1900 Grünstadt station became the departure point for a link to Weiler Neuoffstein on the Worms-Offstein railway run by the South German Railway Company (7 km) and on 1 March 1903 for the Leiningen Valley Railway to Altleiningen (11 km).
- Finally on 1 May 1904 the opening of the Homburg–Glan-Münchweiler (22 km) and Altenglan–Offenbach-Hundheim–Lauterecken-Grumbach (20 km) sections of the Glan Valley Railway enabled through trains to run between Mainz and Saarbrücken, something which was also desirable for military reasons.

On 1 January 1909 the company was nationalised and absorbed into the Royal Bavarian State Railways.

== See also ==
- Royal Bavarian State Railways
