= Bad Dürkheim-Trift station =

Railway station in Germany

Bad Dürkheim-Trift

General information
- Location: Triftweg 130; 67098 Bad Dürkheim; Rhineland-Palatinate; Germany
- Coordinates: 49°27′59″N 8°11′34″E
- Owner: DB Netz
- Operator: DB Station&Service
- Lines: Palatine Northern Railway (KBS 667)
- Platforms: 1 side platform
- Tracks: 1

Other information
- Station code: 267
- DS100 code: RBDT
- IBNR: 8000708
- Category: 6
- Fare zone: VRN: 92
- Website: www.bahnhof.de

History
- Opened: 1989; 37 years ago

Services
Preceding station	DB Regio Mitte	Following station
Bad Dürkheim towards Neustadt (Weinstraße) Hbf	RB 45	Erpolzheim towards Monsheim
Location
- Location within Rhineland-Palatinate

Bad Dürkheim-Trift station is a railway station in the municipality of Bad Dürkheim, located in the district of Bad Dürkheim in Rhineland-Palatinate, Germany.
