= Erpolzheim station =

Railway station in Erpolzheim, Germany

Erpolzheim
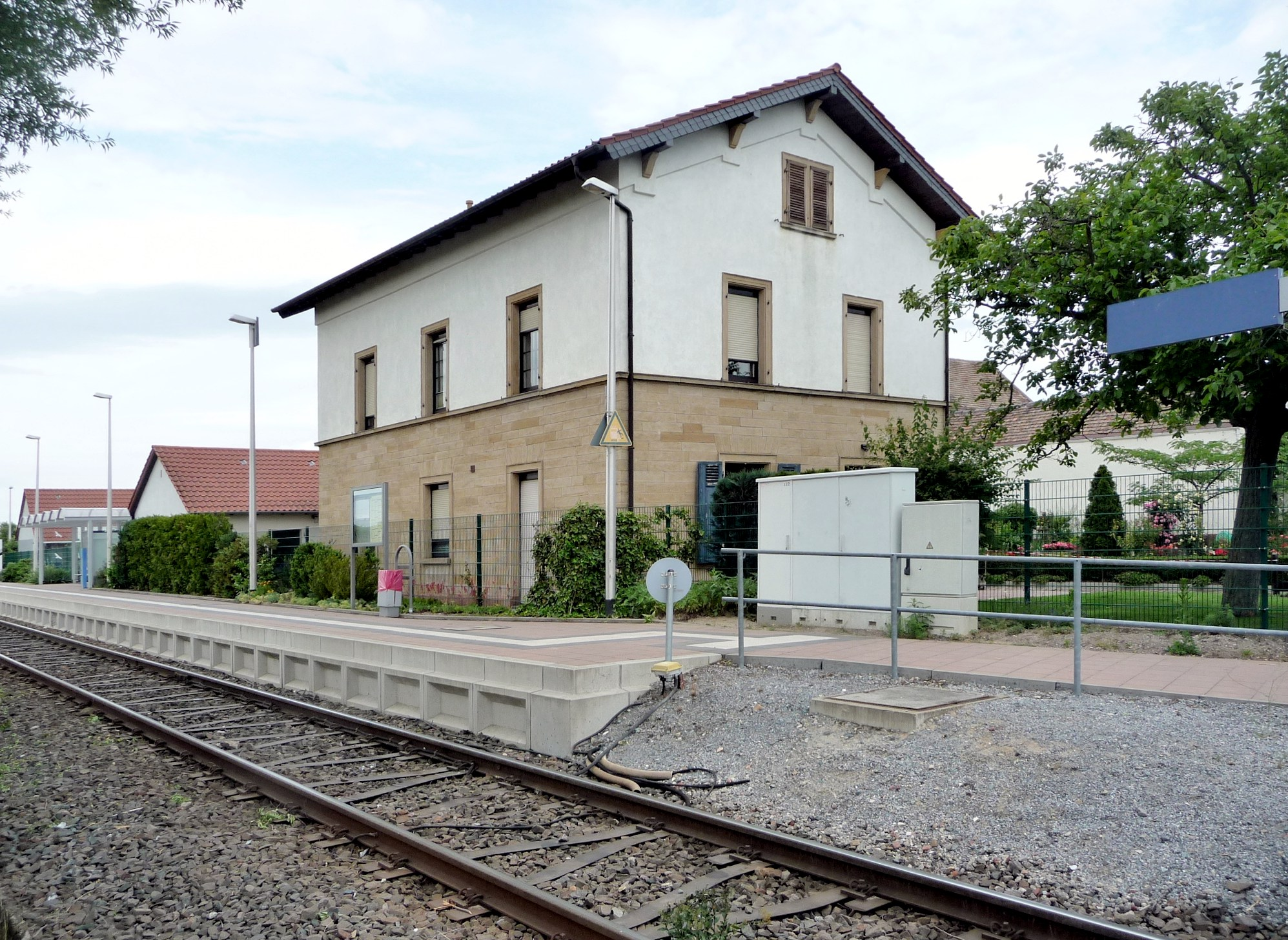
- 2012

General information
- Location: Bahnhofstraße 70; 67167 Erpolzheim; Rhineland-Palatinate, Germany
- Coordinates: 49.4884°N 8.2108°E
- Owner: DB Netz
- Operator: DB Station&Service
- Lines: Palatine Northern Railway (KBS 667)
- Platforms: 1 side platform
- Tracks: 1

Other information
- Station code: 1665
- DS100 code: RERO
- IBNR: 8001860
- Category: 6
- Fare zone: VRN: 82
- Website: www.bahnhof.de

History
- Opened: 20 July 1873; 153 years ago

Services
Preceding station	DB Regio Mitte	Following station
Bad Dürkheim-Trift towards Neustadt (Weinstraße) Hbf	RB 45	Freinsheim towards Monsheim
Location
- Location within Rhineland-Palatinate

Erpolzheim station is a railway station in the municipality of Erpolzheim, located in the district of Bad Dürkheim in Rhineland-Palatinate, Germany.
