= Freinsheim station =

Railway station in Freinsheim, Germany

Freinsheim
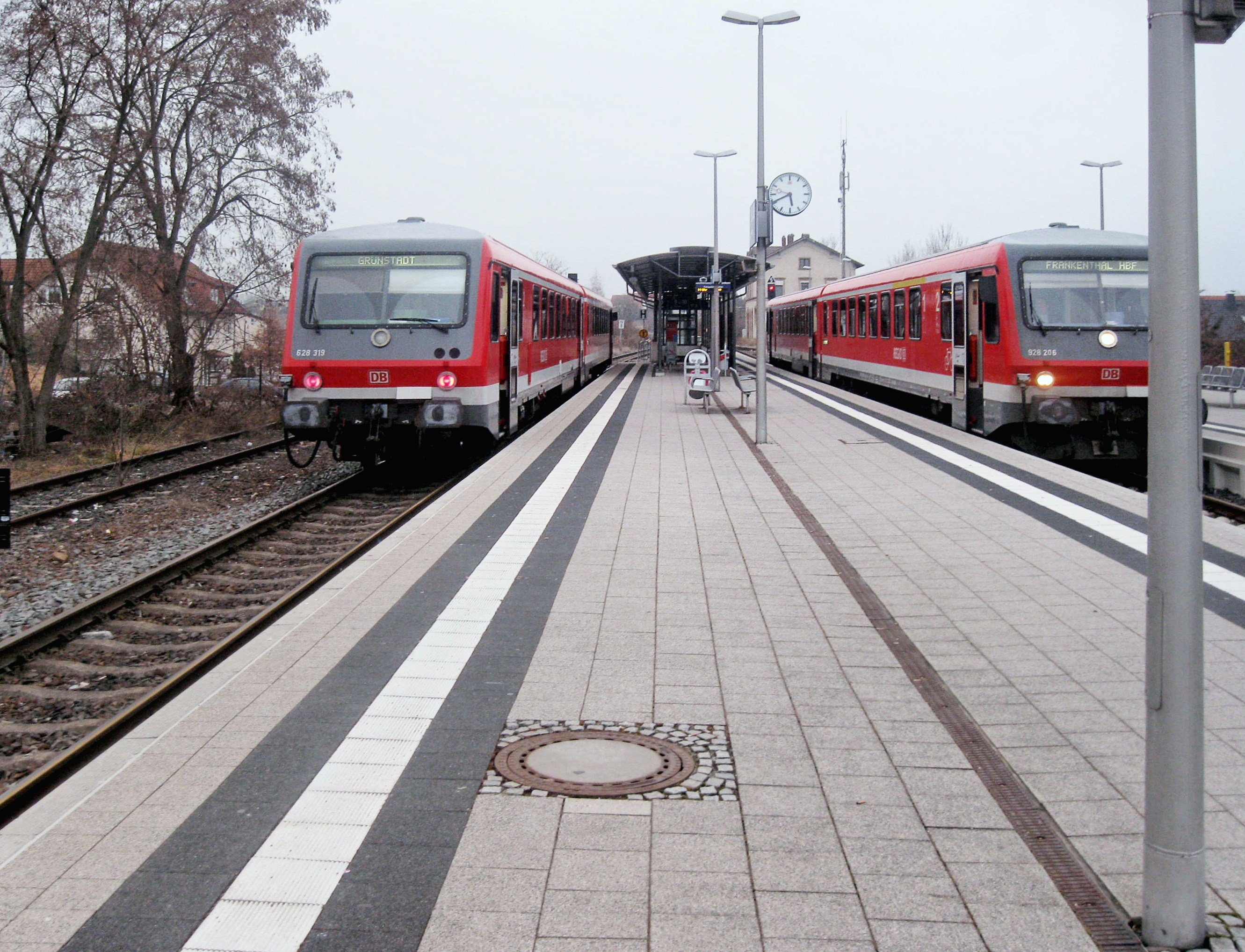

General information
- Location: Freinsheim, Rhineland-Palatinate; Germany
- Coordinates: 49°30′09″N 08°12′17″E
- Lines: Freinsheim–Frankenthal; Neustadt–Grünstadt
- Platforms: 3

Construction
- Accessible: Yes

Other information
- Station code: 1907
- DS100 code: RFHM
- Category: 4
- Fare zone: VRN: 82
- Website: www.bahnhof.de

History
- Opened: 20 July 1860

Services
Preceding station	DB Regio Mitte	Following station
Erpolzheim towards Neustadt (Weinstraße) Hbf	RB 45	Herxheim am Berg towards Monsheim
Weisenheim (Sand) towards Frankenthal Hbf	RB 46	Herxheim am Berg towards Eiswoog
Location

Freinsheim station is a station in Freinsheim in the German state of Rhineland-Palatinate. It is at the junction of the Palatinate Northern Railway and the Freinsheim–Frankenthal railway. The station is one of the most important railway junctions in the Palatinate. It is classified by Deutsche Bahn as a category 4 station.

== History ==
The station was opened on 20 July 1860 as part of the Bad Dürkheim–Grünstadt section on the Palatine Northern Railway. On 15 October 1877, the station was upgraded with the opening of the line to Frankenthal.

== Infrastructure ==
The station has three platforms tracks and two platforms. One platform is used by trains towards Neustadt or Grünstadt on the Palatinate Northern Railway, while the other platform is used by trains coming from Frankenthal or Grünstadt running on the Freinsheim–Frankenthal line. The station building, which was built as a single block, is no longer used.

The station is located on the western outskirts of Freinsheim. To the south of the station is the junction of the Freinsheim–Frankenthal line with the Palatine Northern Railway. The station has an important function as a node in the Palatinate due to its central location in the Frankenthal-Grünstadt-Bad Dürkheim triangle.

The station building, a three-story stucco building with a sandstone portico and a wooden roof, was built in 1872/73 and is a listed building.

== Operations ==
Freinsheim station is served exclusively by local services. The two lines are operated mainly by Alstom Coradia LINT electric multiple units. Services run between Neustadt and Freinsheim every half hour on week days. Once an hour these continue to Grünstadt. Trains from Frankenthal end in Ramsen on weekdays; they only continue to Eiswoog or Monsheim on Wednesdays, Sundays and public holidays.

Line	Route		Frequency
RB 45	Frankenthal – Freinsheim – Grünstadt –	Eisenberg (Pfalz) – Ramsen (– Eiswoog)	Hourly on each branch
RB 45	Frankenthal – Freinsheim – Grünstadt –	Monsheim	Hourly on each branch
RB 46	Neustadt Hbf – Bad Dürkheim – Freinsheim		Every half hour
