= Neustadt–Dürkheim Railway Company =

Railway in Bavaria

The Neustadt–Dürkheim Railway Company (Neustadt-Dürkheimer Eisenbahn-Gesellschaft ) or NDE was an early German railway company dating from the final decade of Bavarian independence. It was founded on 22 October 1862, by a committee of leading citizens from Deidesheim and Bad Dürkheim. The railway ran from north to south, connecting Durkheim (which since 1904 has been known as Bad Dürkheim) at the northern end to Neustadt an der Haardt (since 1950 known as Neustadt an der Weinstraße) at the southern end. The largest intermediate town was Deidesheim.

The company worked closely with the Palatine Ludwigsbahn Company to which it transferred operational and administrative control. During subsequent decades the economic focus of the region was drawn twenty kilometres to the east. The reason for that was the higher wage levels available from the burgeoning chemical industry in nearby Ludwigshafen that drew earning and spending power away from the axis followed by the line south from Bad Dürkheim. The railway was opened on 6 May 1865, but was not as profitable as had been foreseen.

On 1 January 1870 the three largest railway companies in the region were united under the Palatinate Railway (Pfalzbahn) and the NDE was wound up. Its assets were transferred to the Palatine Northern Railway. Three and a half years later, on 20 July 1873, a continuation beyond Bad Dürkheim opened: this extended the line as far north as Grünstadt.

The three united private railways remained officially independent until they were nationalised on 1 January 1909, and merged into the Royal Bavarian State Railways.

== Sources ==
- de:Neustadt-Dürkheimer Eisenbahn-Gesellschaft
