= Bad Dürkheim station =

Railway station in Bad Dürkheim, Germany

Bad Dürkheim
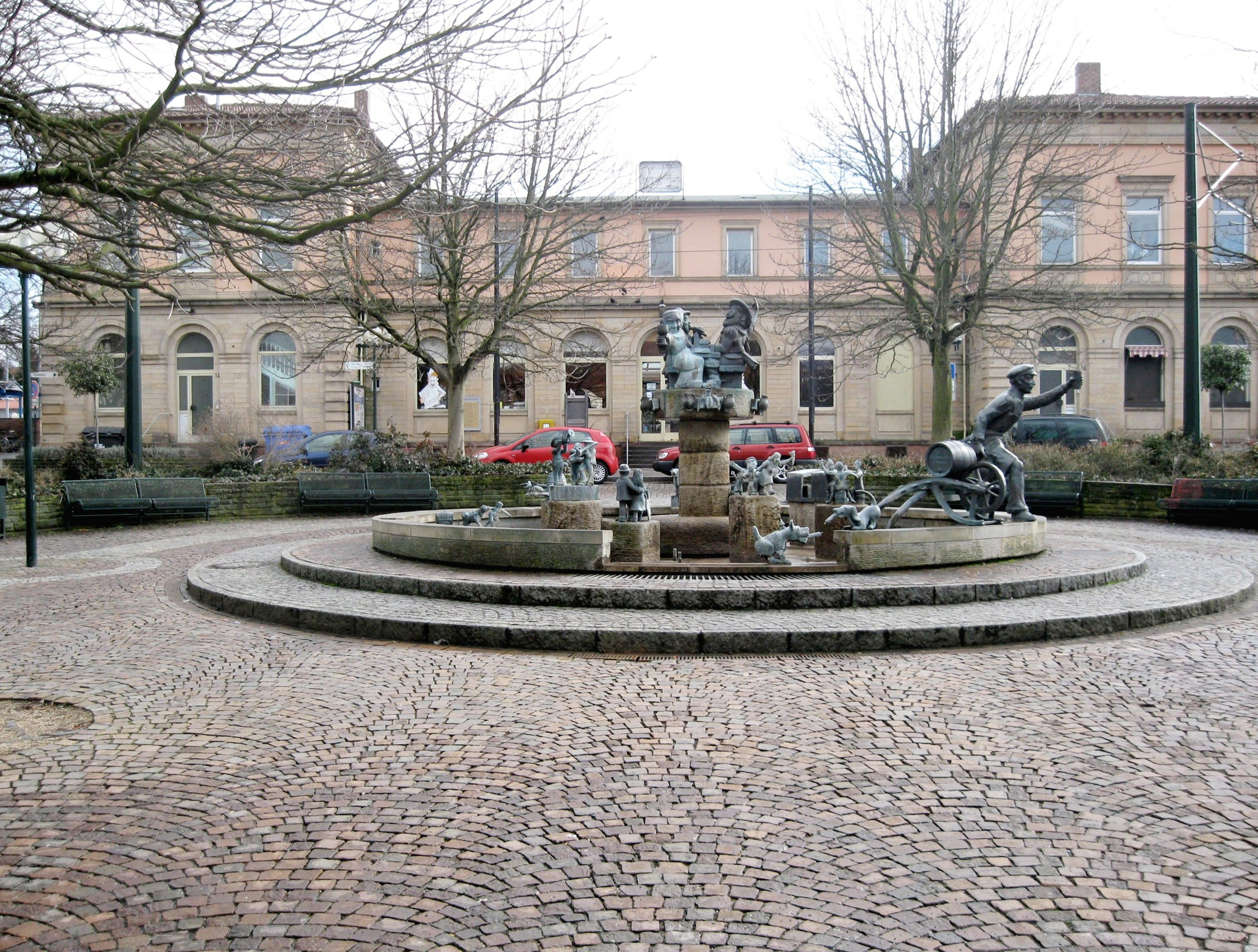

General information
- Location: Bad Dürkheim, Rhineland-Palatinate; Germany
- Coordinates: 49°27′39″N 8°10′14″E
- Lines: Neustadt–Grünstadt (13.5 km) (KBS 667); Bad Dürkheim–Ludwigshafen-Oggersheim (0.0 km) (KBS 668)
- Platforms: 3

Construction
- Accessible: Yes

Other information
- Station code: 266
- DS100 code: RBDH
- Category: 5
- Fare zone: VRN: 92
- Website: www.bahnhof.de

History
- Opened: 15 November 1870

Services
Preceding station	DB Regio Mitte	Following station
Wachenheim (Pfalz) towards Neustadt (Weinstraße) Hbf	RB 45	Bad Dürkheim-Trift towards Monsheim
Location

Bad Dürkheim station is a terminal station in Bad Dürkheim in the German state of Rhineland-Palatinate. It is on the Palatinate Northern Railway between Neustadt an der Weinstraße and Monsheim. It is classified by Deutsche Bahn as a category 5 station.

== Entrance building ==
The entrance building is a heritage-listed building.

In front of the entrance building is the terminus of the Bad Dürkheim–Ludwigshafen-Oggersheim railway. Bad Dürkheim also includes the stations of Bad Dürkheim-Trift and Bad Dürkheim Ost.

== History ==
The station was opened on 6 May 1865 as part of the Neustadt–Bad Durkheim line. The station was not relocated with the closing of the Grünstadt–Bad Durkheim gap on 20 July 1873, so the station remains as a terminal station, even though it is in the middle on the line.

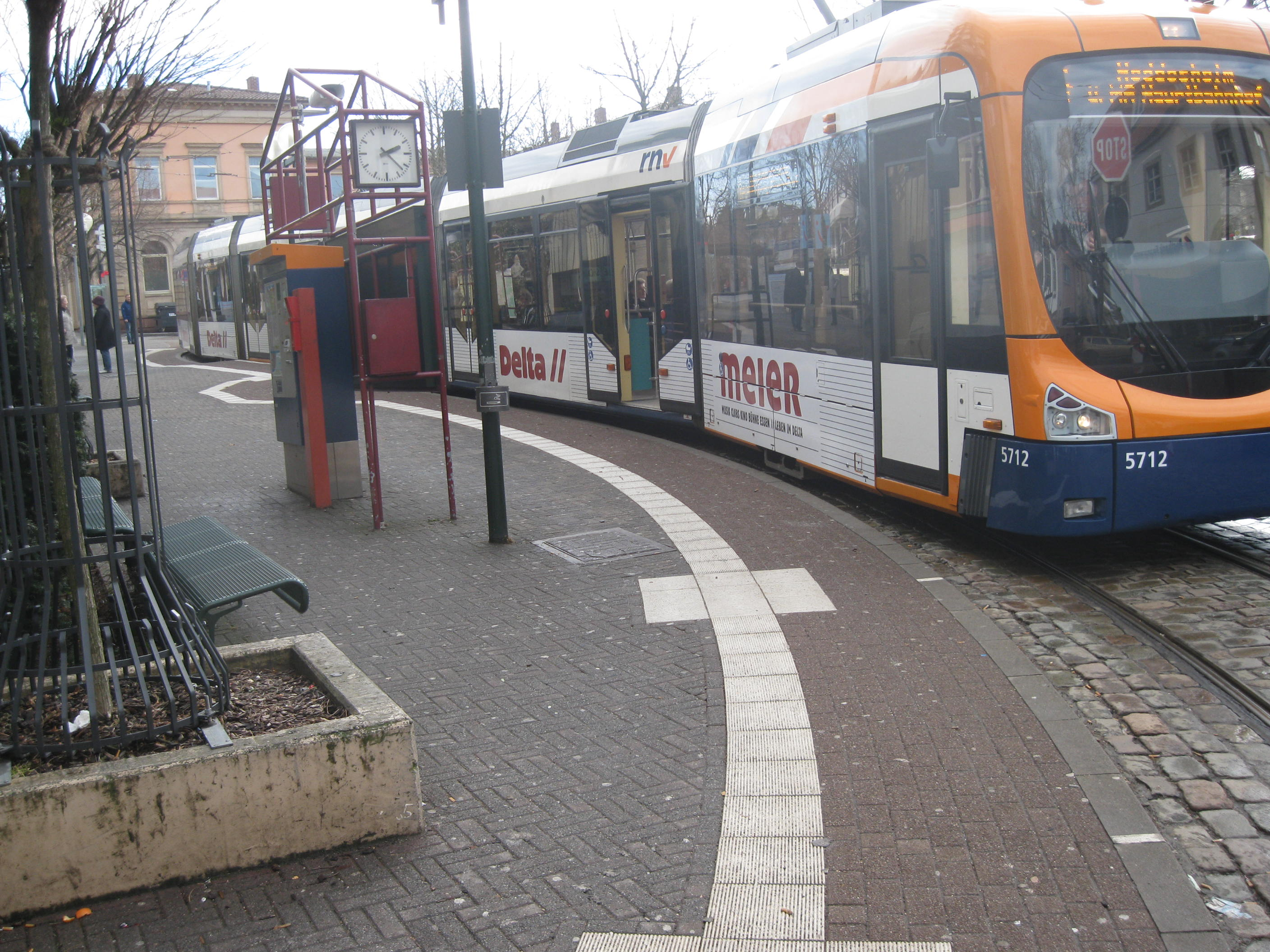
Tram to Ludwigshafen-Oggersheim in the station forecourt

In 1913, the Bad Durkheim–Ludwigshafen-Oggersheim railway was opened by Rhein-Haardt Bahn GmbH, which begins on the station forecourt. Between Ludwigshafen-Oggersheim and Bad Durkheim, the line, which was authorised as a railway, runs in Bad Dürkheim as a tram on grooved rails.

== Operations ==
Bad Durkheim station has three platform tracks, which are used only by regional trains. Regional services connect the station with Neustadt an der Weinstraße at 30-minute intervals. The terminal loop of the Bad Durkheim–Ludwigshafen-Oggersheim railway is located outside the station. This route is served by line 4 of the Mannheim/Ludwigshafen tramways.

Line	Route	Frequency
RB 45	Neustadt (Weinstr) Hbf – Bad Dürkheim – Freinsheim ( – Grünstadt – Monsheim)	Every half hour
4	Heddesheim – Mannheim – Ludwigshafen – Maxdorf – Ellerstadt – Bad Dürkheim	Every 30 min (hourly on Sat/Sun and public holidays)
