= Palatine Ludwig Railway Company =

Railway company in Germany

The Palatine Ludwig Railway Company (Pfälzische Ludwigsbahn-Gesellschaft) was a German railway company founded in 1844 in the Kingdom of Bavaria. The company planned and operated the Palatine Ludwig Railway (Ludwigsbahn) between Ludwigshafen and Bexbach in the area around the Rhein, a region of southwest Germany that was once part of the German Empire. The railway should have served in particular the transportation between Saar region coal industry from the Bexbach Revier to the Rhine and from there to the emerging industrial centers in the south of Germany and Switzerland.

== History ==
On 1 January 1870, the Palatine Ludwig Railway Company, the Palatine Maximilian Railway Company and the Palatine Northern Railway (with which the Neustadt-Dürkheim Railway Company had amalgamated) had formed a management and operational association under the name "United Palatine Railways" (Vereinigte Pfälzische Eisenbahnen) or Palatinate Railway (Pfalzbahn) for short, with its headquarters in Ludwigshafen. Nevertheless, Palatine Ludwig Railway was responsible for the subsequent opening of the following railway lines:

- Ludwigshafen–Frankenthal–Bobenheim, 19 km (12 mi), on 15 November 1853
- Speyer–Germersheim, 13 km (8.1 mi), on 14 March 1864
- Speyer–Rhein station – towards Schwetzingen, 4 km (2.5 mi), on 10 December 1873
- Landau–Annweiler, 15 km (9.3 mi), on 12 September 1874
- Annweiler–Biebermühle–Zweibrücken, 57 km (35 mi), (Queich Valley Railway) and
- Biebermühle–Pirmasens, 7 km (4.3 mi), on 25 November 1875
- Einöd–Bierbach–Reinheim–Saargemünd, 33 km (21 mi), on 1 April 1879 (Blies valley line)
- Biebermühle–Waldfischbach, 5 km (3.1 mi), on 1 June 1904 (Biebermühl Railway)

In addition the following narrow gauge routes belonging to the Palatine Ludwig Railway should be mentioned:

- Ludwigshafen–Dannstadt, 13 km (8.1 mi), and Ludwigshafen–Frankenthal, 11 km (6.8 mi), on 15 October 1890
- Frankenthal–Großkarlbach, 13 km, on 1 July 1891
- Speyer Lokalbahnhof–Geinsheim, 19 km (12 mi), on 26 August 1905 (Pfefferminzbähnel/Gäubähnel)
- Geinsheim–Neustadt branch line station, 10 km (6.2 mi), on 31 October 1908 (Pfefferminzbähnel/Gäubähnel)

On 1 January 1909, the Ludwigsbahn was transferred into the ownership of the Royal Bavarian State Railways along with the other companies belonging to the Palatinate Railway.

== See also ==
- History of rail transport in Germany
- Royal Bavarian State Railways
- List of Palatine locomotives and railbuses
