= Grünstadt station =

Railway station in Grünstadt, Germany

Grünstadt
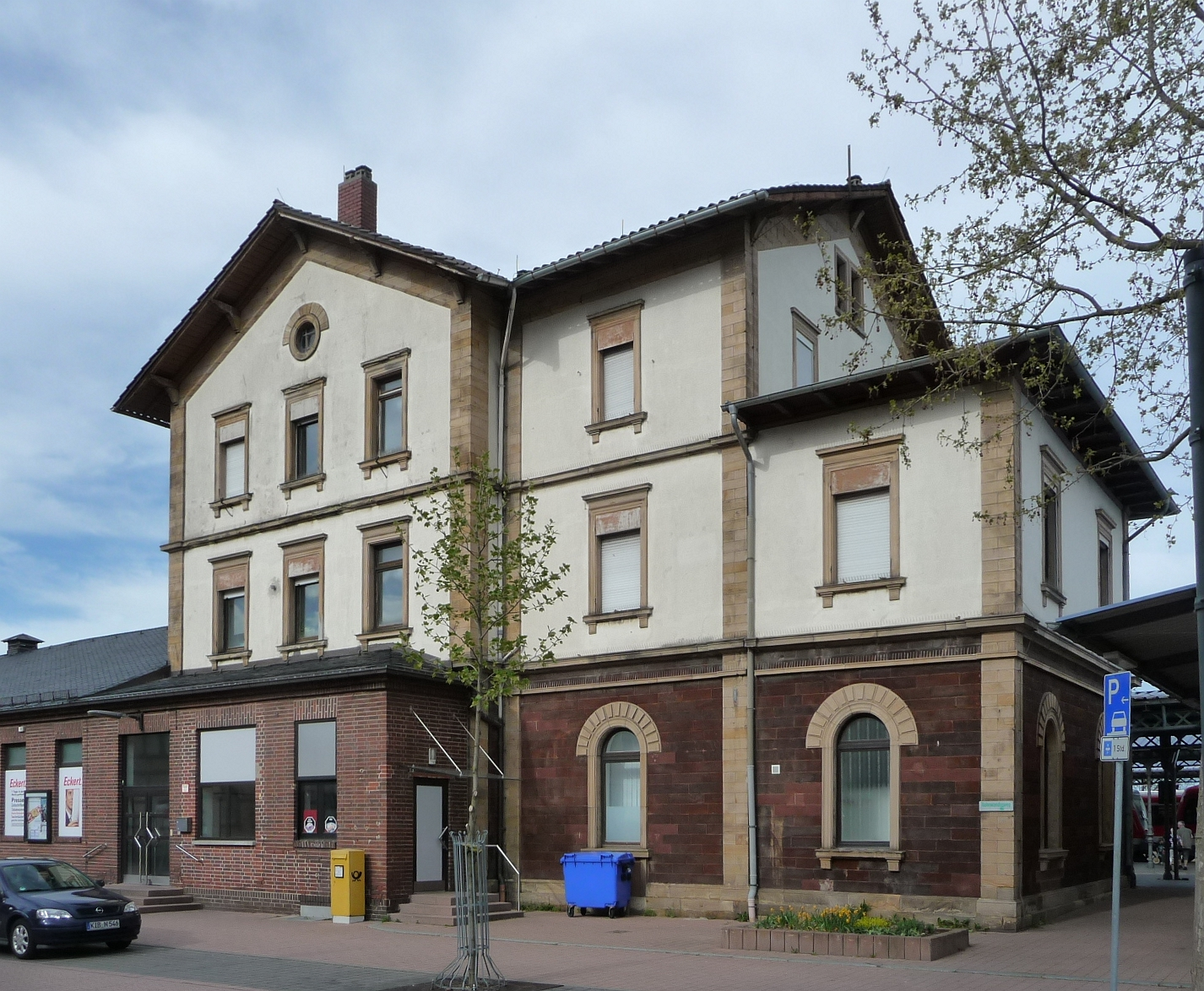

General information
- Location: Grünstadt, Rhineland-Palatinate; Germany
- Coordinates: 49°33′51″N 8°10′04″E
- Lines: Eis Valley Railway; Grünstadt–Altleiningen; Palatine Northern Railway; Worms–Grünstadt
- Platforms: 3

Construction
- Accessible: Yes

Other information
- Station code: 2402
- DS100 code: RGR
- IBNR: 8000137
- Category: 4
- Fare zone: VRN: 52 and 72
- Website: www.bahnhof.de

History
- Opened: 21 March 1873; 153 years ago

Services
Preceding station	DB Regio Mitte	Following station
Kirchheim (Weinstr) towards Neustadt (Weinstraße) Hbf	RB 45	Albsheim (Eis) towards Monsheim
Kirchheim (Weinstr) towards Frankenthal Hbf	RB 46	Grünstadt Nord towards Eiswoog
Location

Grünstadt station is a railway junction where the Palatine Northern Railway connects with the Eis Valley Railway and the disused tracks of the Leiningen Valley Railway and the Worms–Grünstadt railway. It is one of three stations in the urban area of Grünstadt in the German state of Rhineland-Palatinate. The station's entrance building of 1873 as well as parts of the premises are protected as monuments. It is classified by Deutsche Bahn as a category 4 station.

== History ==
Grünstadt station was opened on 21 March 1873, with the northern section of the Palatine Northern Railway between Grünstadt and Monsheim. In the same year operations commenced on the section from Bad Dürkheim. With the opening of lines to Enkenbach, Worms and Altleiningen, it gained connections in five directions.

Between 1967 and 1984 with the exception of the lines to Bad Durkheim and Frankenthal via Freinsheim, all lines from Grünstadt were shut down and the station became a terminus. Its function as a railway junction was restored in 1995 with the resumption of passenger traffic on the lines to Eisenberg and Monsheim in the Rhineland-Palatinate integrated regular interval timetable.

Coinciding with the reactivation of the Palatine Northern Railway between Grünstadt and Monsheim and the Eis Valley Railway, the station was transformed as a Rhineland-Palatinate pilot project into the Grünstadt “environmental station" (Umweltbahnhof Grünstadt). Key elements of the concept were the reuse of the entrance building and the freight shed, the building of a platform underpass to connect the eastern residential areas and the construction of a bus station between the entrance building and platform 1 and park-and-ride areas to the west and east of the main lines.

== Infrastructure ==
A bus station was created with the remodelling of the station environment around track 1 (the “home” platform) and 2, so today it only has three of its original five through platform tracks. Even the two bay platforms connecting to platform 1 and 2 were removed. Part of the extensive system of freight tracks that connected Südzucker operations in Grünstadt to Worms were acquired for the construction of a park-and-ride area.

The two mechanical signal boxes at the northern and southern ends of the station were replaced in 2004 by an electronic interlocking, which is controlled from Neustadt an der Weinstraße. As they are heritage-listed, they are preserved, including substantial parts of their equipment.

== Entrance building ==
The three-storey station building was built in 1873 in an historicist style with Renaissance Revival elements. Two storeys, which are divided by bands of yellow sandstone, are built on a base of plastered red sandstone. North of the station building there is a single-storey wing of red brick, which was built in 1934. To the south, connected by the canopy above the entrance to the platform subway, is a residential building for employees and the former railway freight shed. Protection as a monument has been extended to all parts of the building, the cast iron platform canopies and the railings of the underpass of 1900 and the two signal boxes of 1898/99 at the northern and southern ends of the station.

== Operations ==
The station is served by hourly services towards Neustadt, Monsheim and Frankenthal. Less frequent services operate towards Ramsen and sometimes Eiswoog.

Line	Route	Frequency
RB 45	Neustadt – Bad Dürkheim – Freinsheim – Grünstadt – Monsheim	Hourly
RB 46	Frankenthal – Freinsheim – Grünstadt – Ramsen (– Eiswoog)	Hourly
