= Frankenthal Hauptbahnhof =

Main railway station for Frankenthal, Germany

Frankenthal Hbf
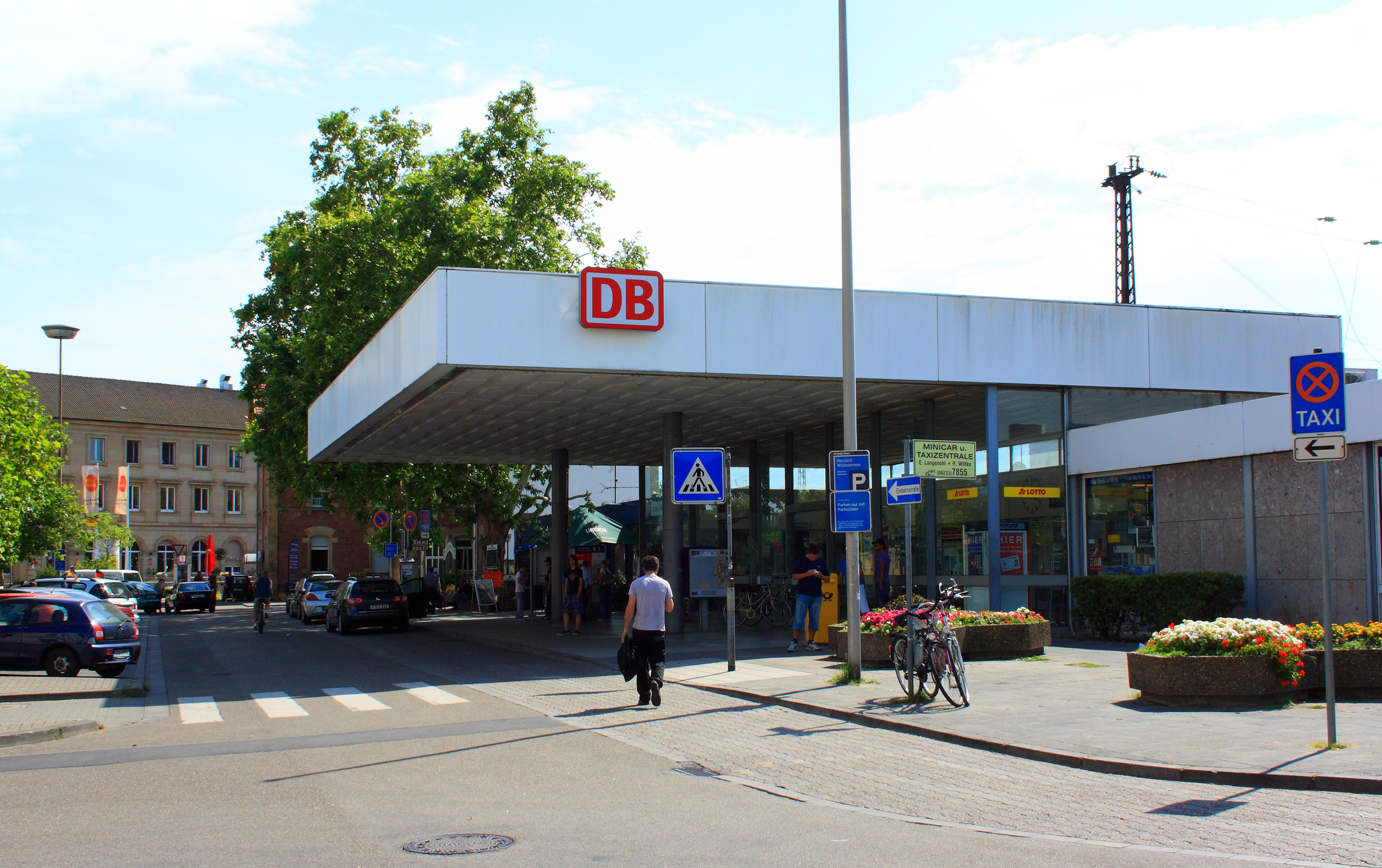

General information
- Location: Eisenbahnstr. 3, Frankenthal, Rhineland-Palatinate; Germany
- Coordinates: 49°32′07″N 8°20′58″E
- Owner: Deutsche Bahn
- Operator: DB Station&Service
- Lines: Mainz–Ludwigshafen (57.0 km) (KBS 660; Freinsheim–Frankenthal (13.4 km) (KBS 666)
- Platforms: 3

Construction
- Accessible: Yes

Other information
- Station code: 1848
- DS100 code: RFT
- IBNR: 8000332
- Category: 3
- Fare zone: VRN: 63
- Website: www.bahnhof.de

History
- Opened: 15 November 1870

Services
Preceding station	DB Regio Mitte	Following station
Worms Hbf towards Frankfurt (Main) Hbf	RE 4	Ludwigshafen Hbf towards Karlsruhe Hbf
Worms Hbf towards Frankfurt (Main) Hbf	RE 14 Südwest-Express	Ludwigshafen Hbf towards Mannheim Hbf
Terminus	RB 46	Frankenthal Süd towards Eiswoog
Preceding station	Rhine-Neckar S-Bahn	Following station
Bobenheim towards Mainz Hbf	S6	Frankenthal Süd towards Bensheim
Location
- Location within Rhineland-Palatinate Location within Germany Location within Europe

Frankenthal Hauptbahnhof is the main railway station for the city of Frankenthal in the German state of Rhineland-Palatinate and is located on the Mainz–Ludwigshafen railway. It is classified by Deutsche Bahn as a category 3 station. Besides Frankenthal Hauptbahnhof the only other station in Frankenthal are Frankenthal Süd and Flomersheim.

== Location ==
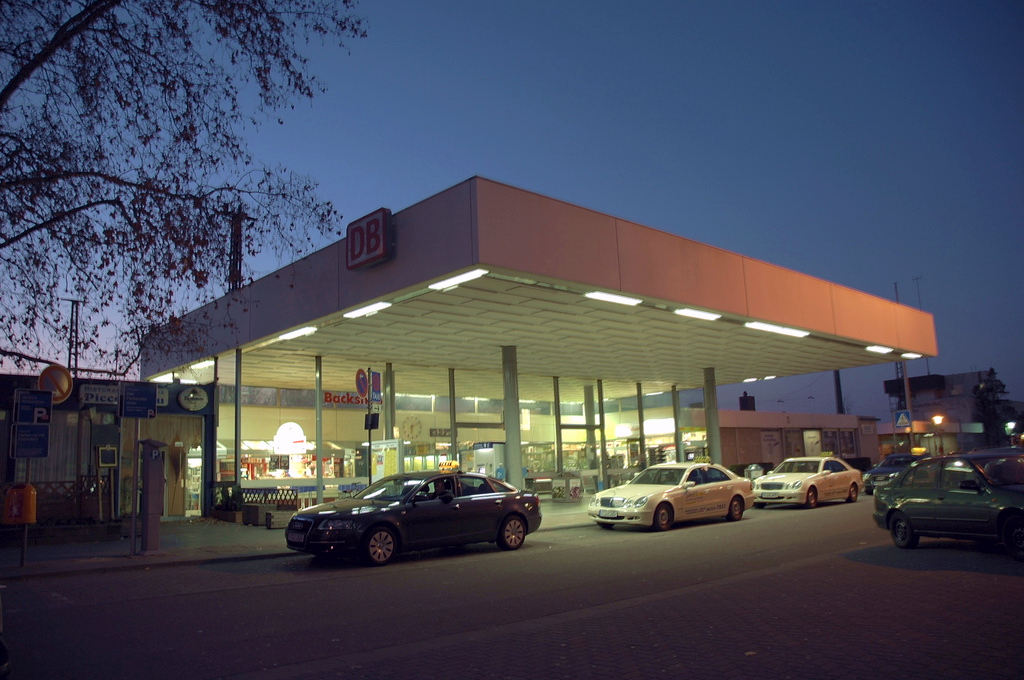
Frankenthal Hauptbahnhof

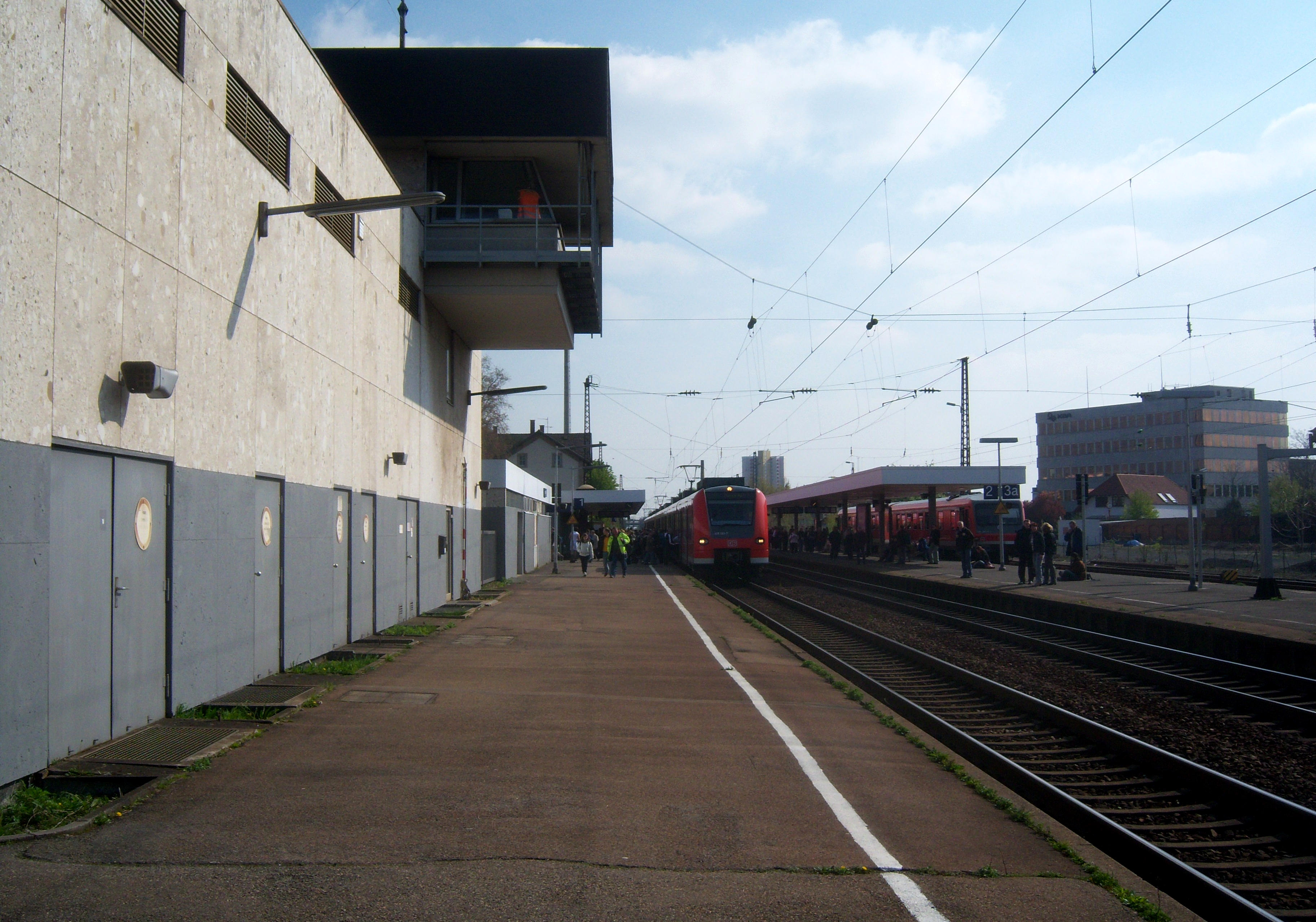
Platforms

The station is centrally located in the city of Frankenthal. The station is served by various lines and is the terminus of the Freinsheim–Frankenthal line. In the station there is a bakery, a kiosk and a newsagent.

== History ==
In November 1853, the Hessian Ludwig Railway completed the section of the Mainz–Ludwigshafen line from the Palatine Ludwig Railway to the Hessian border in Frankenthal. The station in Frankenthal was built initially as a temporary structure. By 1860 the line was between Worms and Ludwigshafen am Rhein was duplicated. The official inauguration of the permanent Frankenthal station was held on 15 November 1870. The Freinsheim–Frankenthal line opened to the station on 15 October 1877.

From 1891 to 1939, the metre gauge Frankenthal–Großkarlbach Local Railway (Lokalbahn Ludwigshafen–Großkarlbach) ran from the station to Großkarlbach. From 1890 to 1933, the Ludwigshafen–Frankenthal Local Railway (Lokalbahn Ludwigshafen–Frankenthal) ran to Ludwigshafen. South of the station there was a connection between the local railways and the standard gauge railway to allow the transhipment of freight.

The upgrade of the station started in 2014: platforms 1 and 2 were raised to a height of 76 cm, platform 3a to a height of 55 cm, the platform furniture was renewed, two passenger lifts were built and a station building and travel centre were built. During the construction work there was a dispute between the Deutsche Bahn and the municipality of Frankenthal in relation the width of the platform on track 2. Deutsche Bahn reduced the width of the platform due to underground cables, which was criticised by the municipality.

The new S 6 line of the Rhine-Neckar S-Bahn, which stops in Frankenthal, went into operation at the summer timetable change on 10 June 2018. This replaced the Regionalbahn line RB 44, which had operated at the same frequency.

== Architecture ==
The first station building, which opened in 1870, was similar with its round arched windows and its clock tower to the station building of the former Ludwigshafen terminal station. After the Second World War, a new building was built in the style of the 1950s.

== Rail services ==
The three platform tracks of Frankenthal station are over 300 m long and still have a height of 76 cm and provide barrier-free access to the trains. The station is served by services on two Regional-Express and two Regionalbahn lines.

Line	Route	Frequency	Operator
RE 4	Frankfurt (Main) Hbf – Frankfurt-Höchst – Mainz – Worms – Frankenthal (Pfalz) – Ludwigshafen (Rh) Hbf – Speyer – Germersheim – Graben-Neudorf – Karlsruhe	120 min	DB Regio Mitte
RE 14	Mainz – Worms – Frankenthal (Pfalz) – Ludwigshafen (Rh) Mitte – Mannheim	120 min	DB Regio Mitte
RB 46	Frankenthal – Freinsheim – Grünstadt – Ramsen (– Eiswoog)	60 min (Mon-Fri peak: 30 min)	DB Regio Mitte
S6	Bensheim – Weinheim (Bergstraße) – Neu-Edingen/Friedrichsfeld – Mannheim – Ludwigshafen Mitte – Ludwigshafen Hbf – Frankenthal – Worms – Mainz	60 min	DB Regio Mitte
