= Palatine Northern Railway =

Railway line in Germany

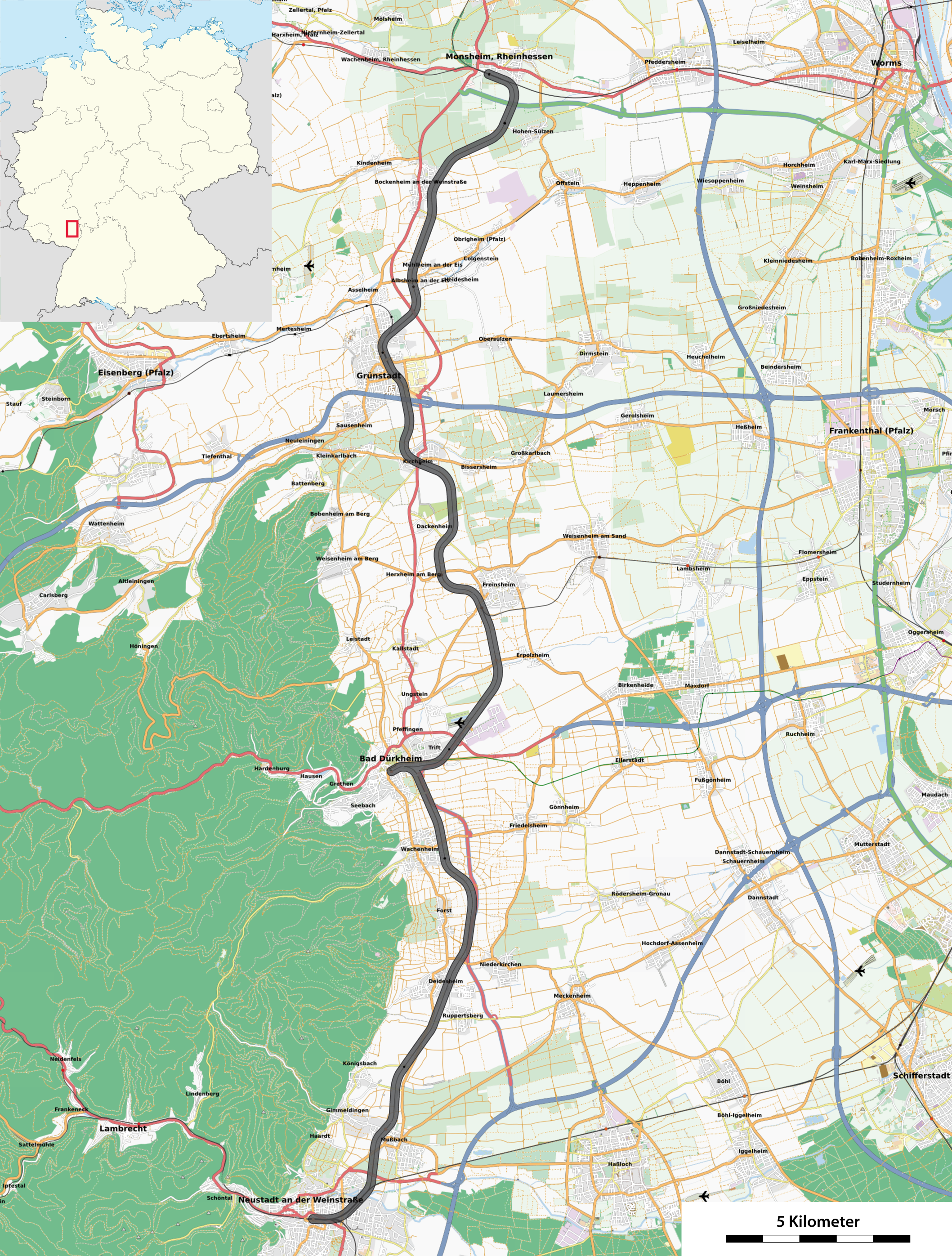

Overview
- Native name: Pfälzische Nordbahn
- Line number: 3430
- Locale: Rhineland-Palatinate, Germany
- Termini: Neustadt (Weinstraße) Hauptbahnhof; Monsheim

Service
- Route number: 667

Technical
- Line length: 39.6 km (24.6 mi)
- Track gauge: 1,435 mm (4 ft 8 1/2 in) standard gauge

The Palatine Northern Railway (German: Pfälzische Nordbahn) is a non-electrified single-track main line that connects Neustadt (Weinstr) Hbf with Monsheim in the German state of Rhineland-Palatinate. It was opened between 1865 and 1873 in three stages. With the replacement of the old Ludwigshafen terminus with the modern Ludwigshafen Hauptbahnhof through station in 1969, Bad Dürkheim station became the only station in the form of a terminus in the Palatinate region. Passenger services over the Grünstadt–Monsheim section were discontinued in 1984, but re-established in 1995.

The name of the line comes from the Palatine Northern Railway Company (Gesellschaft der Pfälzischen Nordbahnen), which acquired the line as its main line in 1870. Its importance lies in the fact that it connects the small towns of Deidesheim, Wachenheim, Bad Dürkheim, Freinsheim and Grünstadt with the railway network.

== Route ==
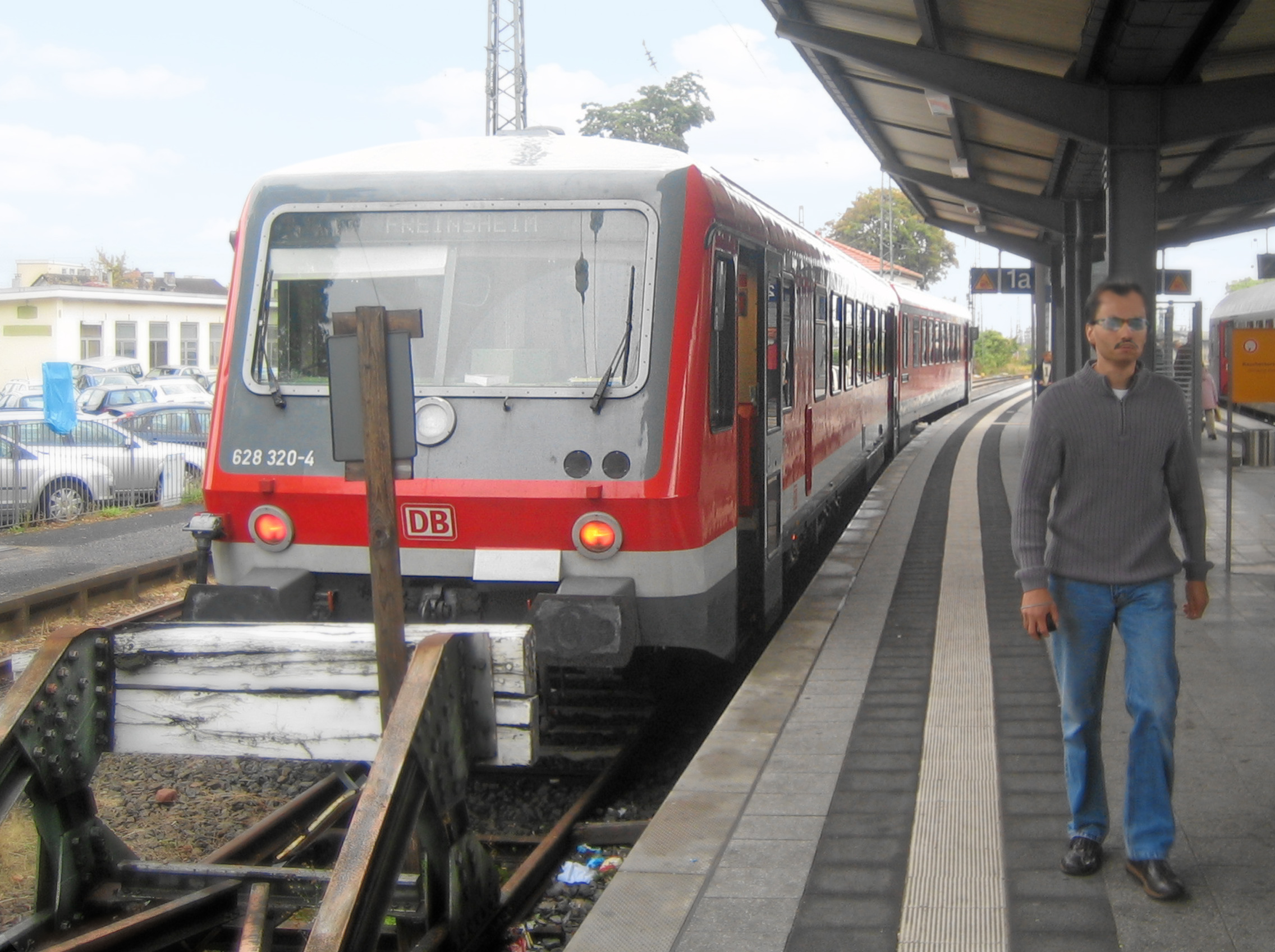
Neustadt (Weinstraße) Hauptbahnhof

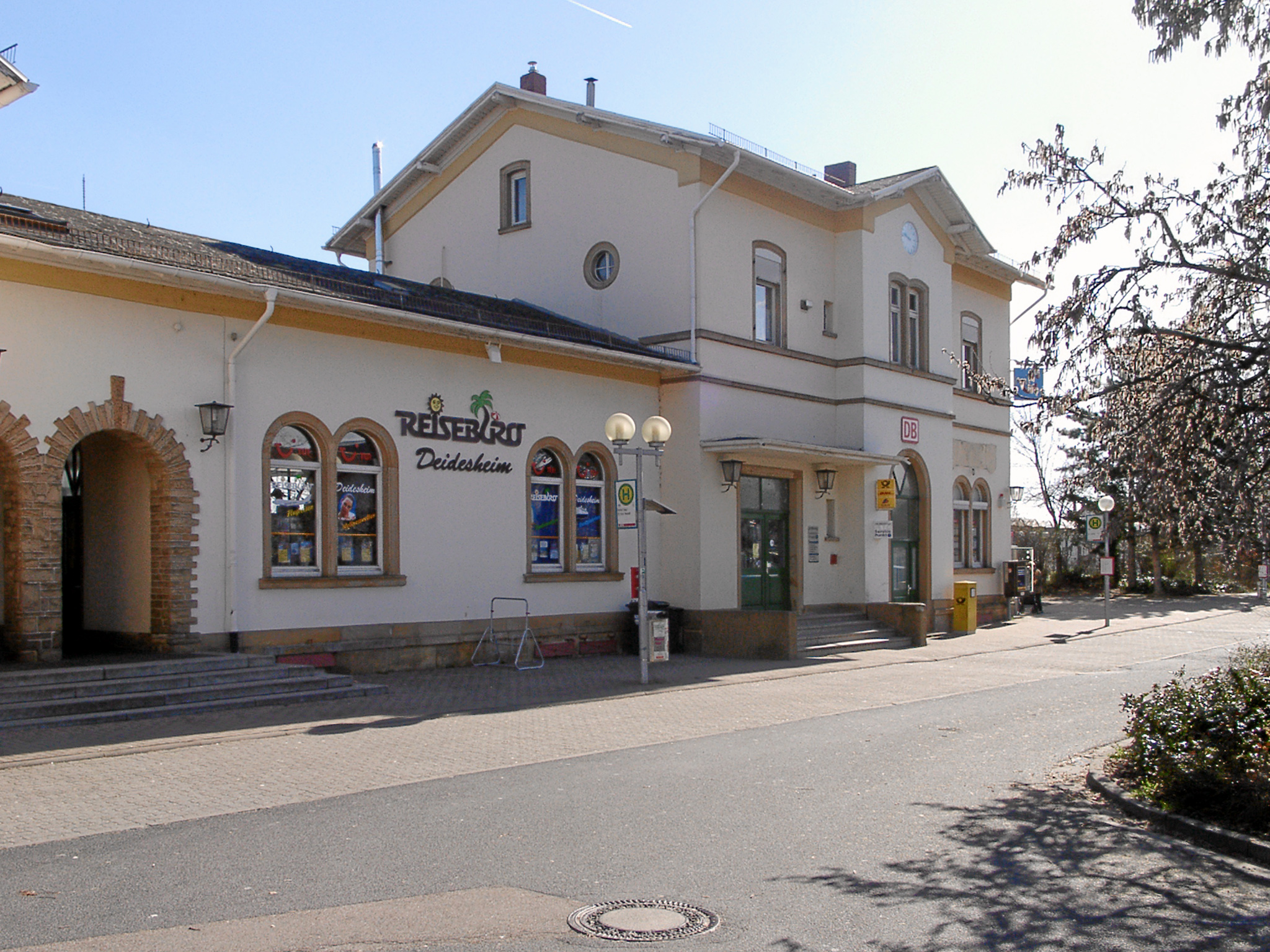
Deidesheim station

The Northern Railway runs through vineyards and open country near the eastern edge of the Palatinate Forest. Starting at Neustadt Hauptbahnhof, it runs to Neustadt-Böbig station parallel to the Palatine Ludwig Railway, later turning to the left towards the north. After passing the Neustadt suburb of Mußbach and the small towns of Deidesheim and Wachenheim, the Northern Railway reaches the Bad Dürkheim terminal station.

Trains reverse on to the northern branch, which then crosses the Rhine-Haardt Railway to reach Freinsheim at the junction with the line from Frankenthal. A few kilometres north just before reaching Grünstadt is the former junction with the Leiningen Valley Railway, which was finally abandoned in 2005. North of Grünstadt station, the Eis Valley Railway branches off to Ramsen and Eiswoog. Shortly before Albsheim the largely abandoned Worms–Grünstadt railway branches off to Neuoffstein. At Bockenheim is the northern terminus of the German Wine Route and the last town in the Palatinate region. About four and a half kilometres north at Monsheim—in Rhenish Hesse—is the terminus of the Rheinhessen Railway.

== History ==
=== Planning, building and opening (1860-1873) ===
In 1860 a local committee was established to promote the construction of a railway from Neustadt via Bad Dürkheim to Frankenthal. In particular, the workers in Bad Dürkheim's factories would benefit from the proposed line. Although such a route would run parallel to the Palatinate Ludwig Railway and the Mainz–Ludwigshafen railway, the promoters were optimistic that the planned route would be preferred because of its greater scenic appeal.

The committee's appeal however, met with little support, as there were fears that it would create difficulties for the Palatine Ludwig Railway Company. For this reason, on 25 January 1862, it was agreed that only a local line would be built between Neustadt and Bad Dürkheim. On 22 August 1862, a concession was issued and two months later, the Neustadt–Dürkheim Railway Company (Neustadt-Dürkheimer Eisenbahn-Gesellschaft) was founded, which was intended to operate the route. Construction of the line, however, was delayed since the location of the station at Wachenheim was unclear at first. In addition, the hilly terrain proved to be a hindrance to the construction of the railway and several Königsbach wine makers continued to oppose the acquisition of their land.

The Neustadt–Bad Dürkheim section opened on 6 May 1865. On 21 March 1873, the Monsheim–Grünstadt section was opened. On 20 July 1873, the gap was closed between Bad Dürkheim and Grünstadt. It was decided not to move the station from Bad Durkheim, which for eight years had been end of the line; rather it served from 1873 as a terminal station from both directions. In 1870, the infrastructure of the line was taken over by the Palatine Northern Railway, the Neustadt-Dürkheim Railway Company was dissolved at the same time.

=== Developments since 1873 ===
In 1909 the Palatine Northern Railway was taken over by the Royal Bavarian State Railways. After the First World War the line became part of the German State Railways. At the end of World War II the line became part of Deutsche Bundesbahn.

== Operations ==
=== Passengers ===
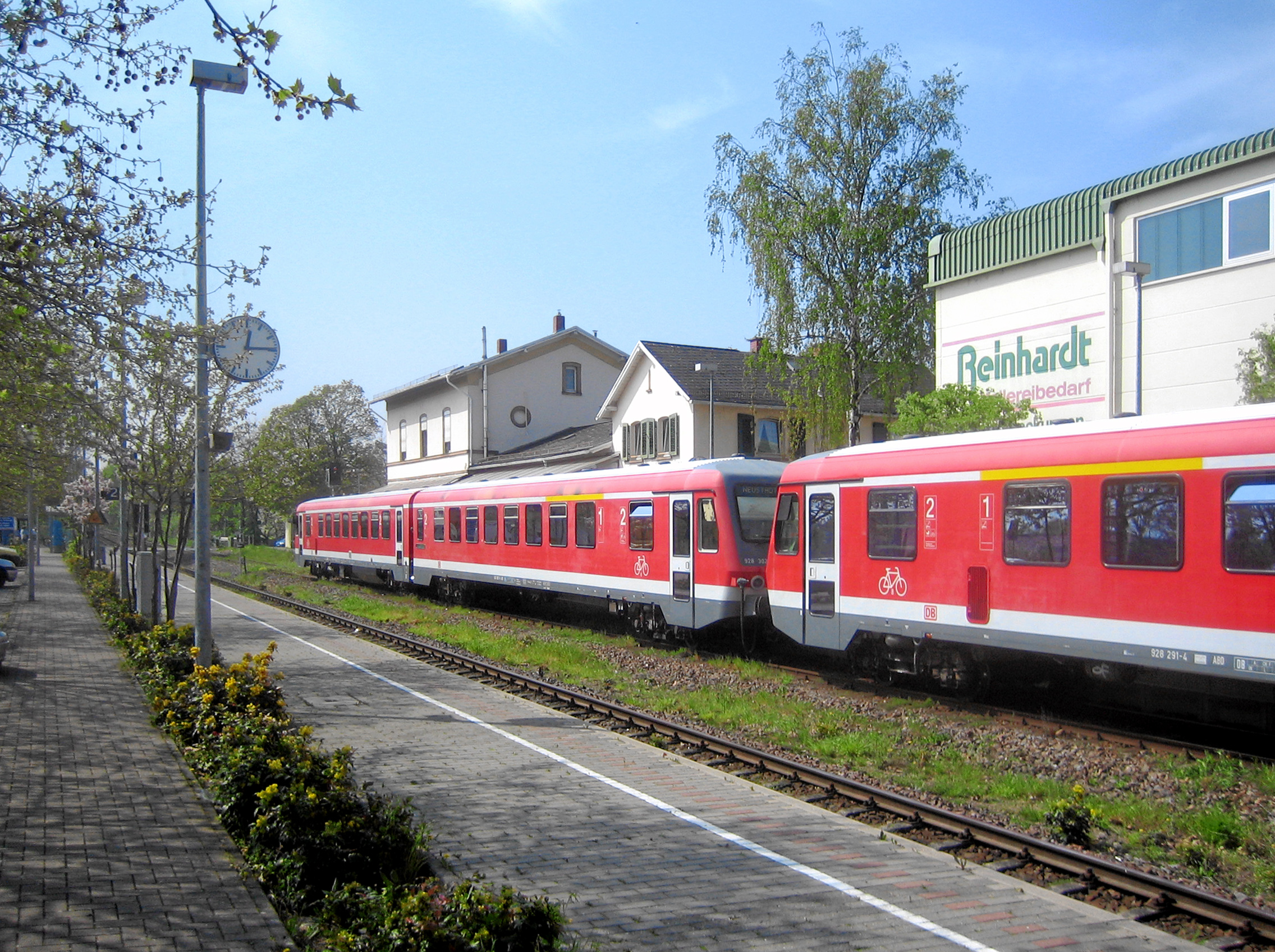
Deidesheim station with two Class 628 diesel multiple units

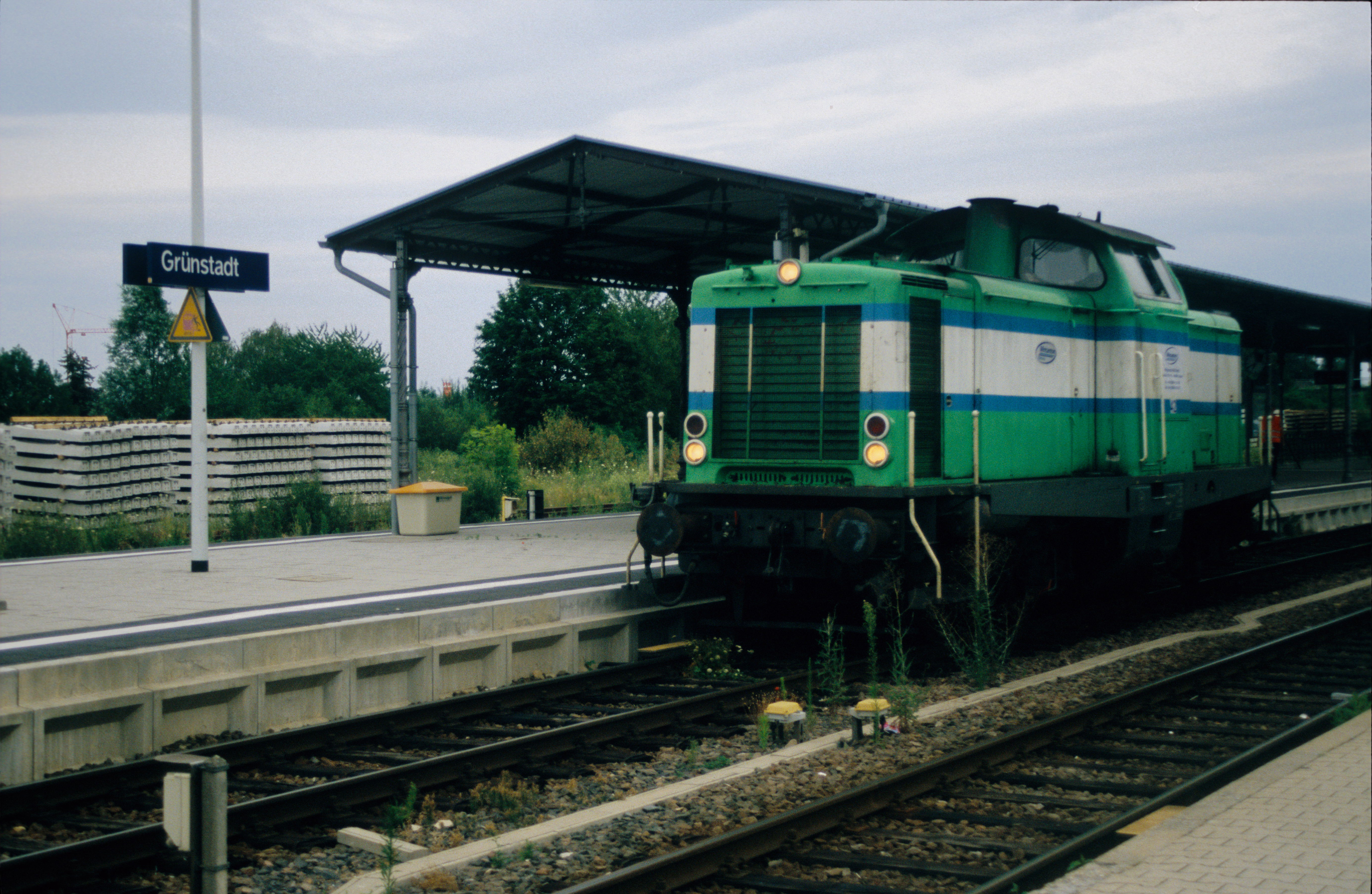
Locomotive 42 of the Wincanton Rail in Grünstadt station (July 2007)

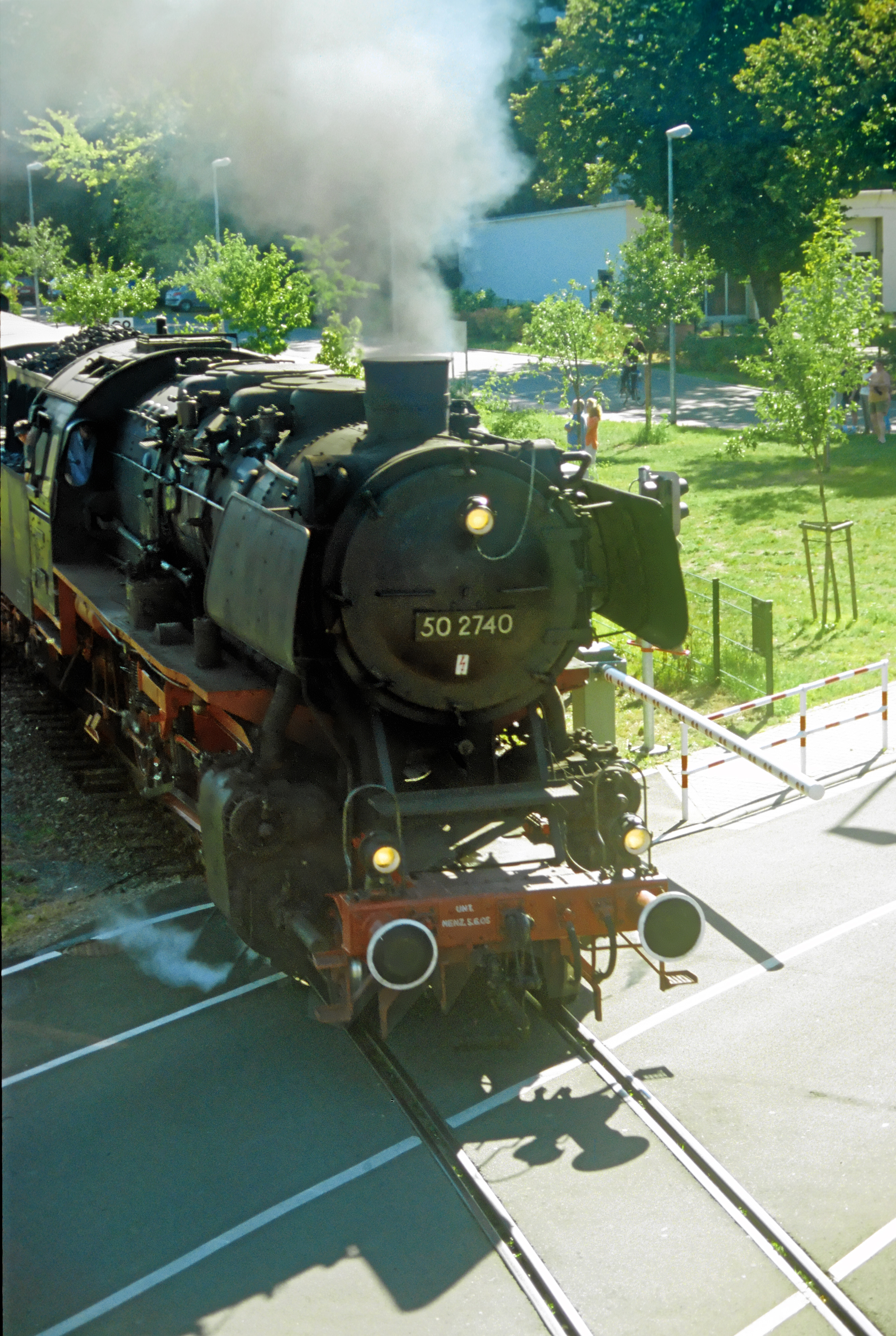
Steam train 50 2740 at Grünstadt in the summer of 2005, running to Monsheim

Operationally, the Northern Railway is divided in three sections, which are run separately:

- Monsheim–Grünstadt
- Grünstadt–Freinsheim
- Freinsheim–Neustadt an der Weinstrasse

Between Monsheim and Grünstadt a pair of trains run every hour; between Grünstadt and Neustadt trains run every 30 minutes. The line is operated with class 628 diesel multiple units.

The Freinsheim–Grünstadt section is also part of route 666, which it addition to this section runs on the Freinsheim–Frankenthal line and the Eis Valley line to Ramsen and Eiswoog.

=== Freight traffic ===
During the sugar beet harvest the Northern Railway is very important for freight transport, particularly around Grünstadt station.

== Sources ==
=== References ===
- Holzborn, Klaus D. (1993). Eisenbahn-Reviere Pfalz (Palatinate railway district) (in German). Berlin: transpress. ISBN 3-344-70790-6.
- Fiegenbaum, Wolfgang; Klee, Wolfgang (2002). Rückkehr zur Schiene—Reaktivierte und neue Strecken im Personenverkehr 1980–2001 (Return to the tracks—Reactivated and new lines for passenger services from 1980 to 2001) (in German). Berlin: transpress. ISBN 3-613-71185-0.
- Sturm, Heinz (2005). Die pfälzischen Eisenbahnen (The Palatine railways) (in German). pro MESSAGE. ISBN 3-934845-26-6.
