= Grünstadt–Altleiningen railway =

Railway line in Germany

Grünstadt–Altleiningen
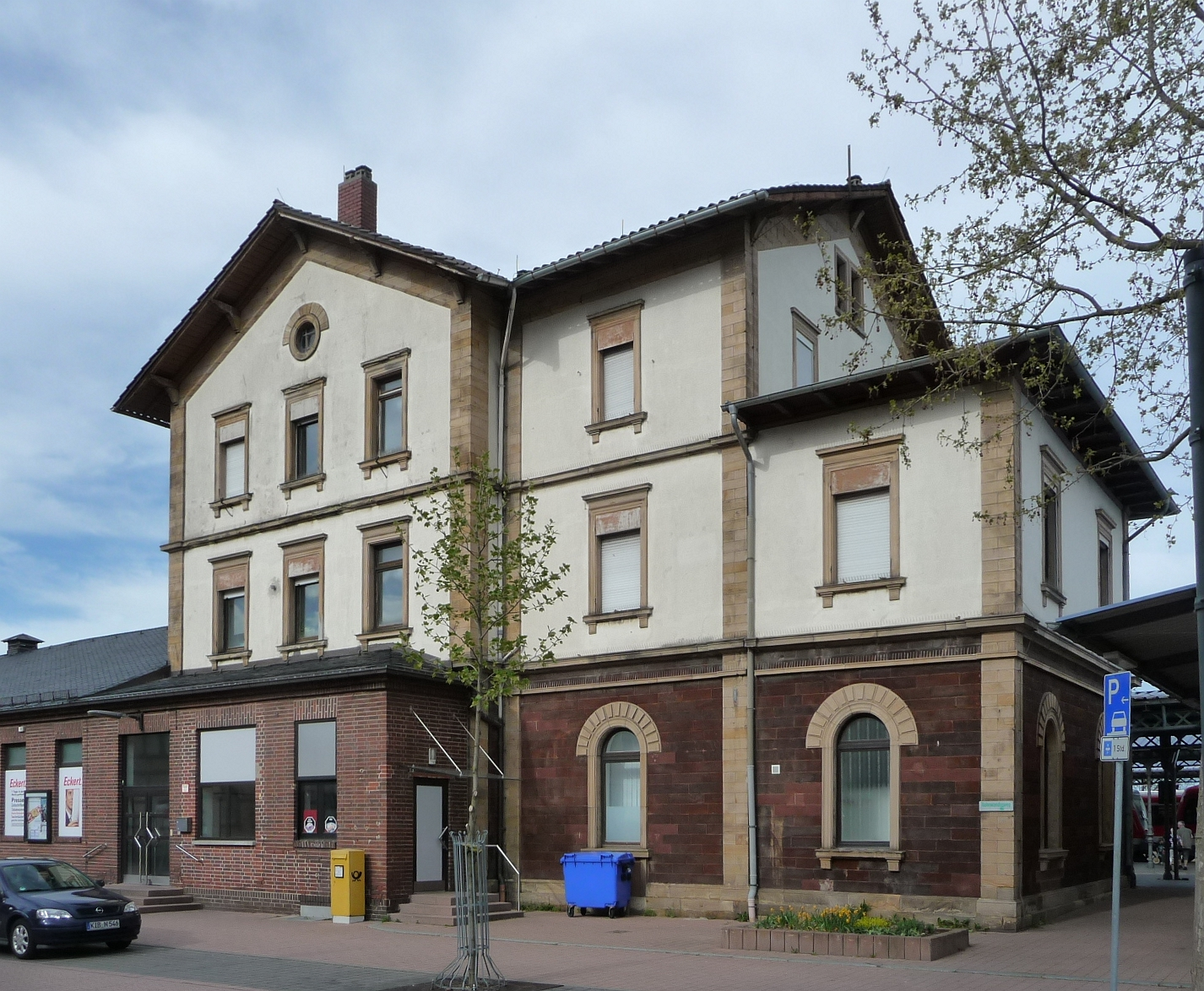
- Grünstadt railway station, departure point for the open line

Overview
- Line number: 3422

Service
- Route number: 274g

Technical
- Line length: 10.7 km (6.6 mi)
- Track gauge: 1,435 mm (4 ft 8 1/2 in)

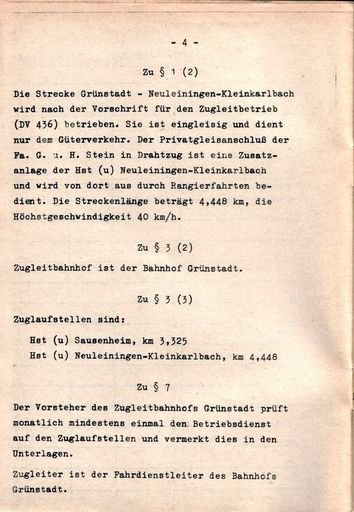
Extract from the 1972 supplementary regulations of the Karlsruhe Division about the Neuleiningen–Kleinkarlbach line

The Grünstadt–Altleiningen railway or Leiningen Valley Railway was a 10.7 kilometre long branch line from Grünstadt to Altleiningen in the northeastern Palatinate Forest of Germany.

The line opened in 1903 and in 1967, all passenger services were withdrawn.In the period that followed, the section between Maihof-Drahtzug and Altleiningen was lifted.

Goods traffic continued on the remaining section until the end of 2005.

== Literature ==
- Klaus D. Holzborn (1993), Eisenbahn-Reviere Pfalz (in German), Berlin: transpress, ISBN 3-344-70790-6
- Heinz Sturm Die pfälzischen Eisenbahnen. pro MESSAGE, 2005 ISBN 3-934845-26-6
