= Mainz–Ludwigshafen railway =

Railway line in Germany

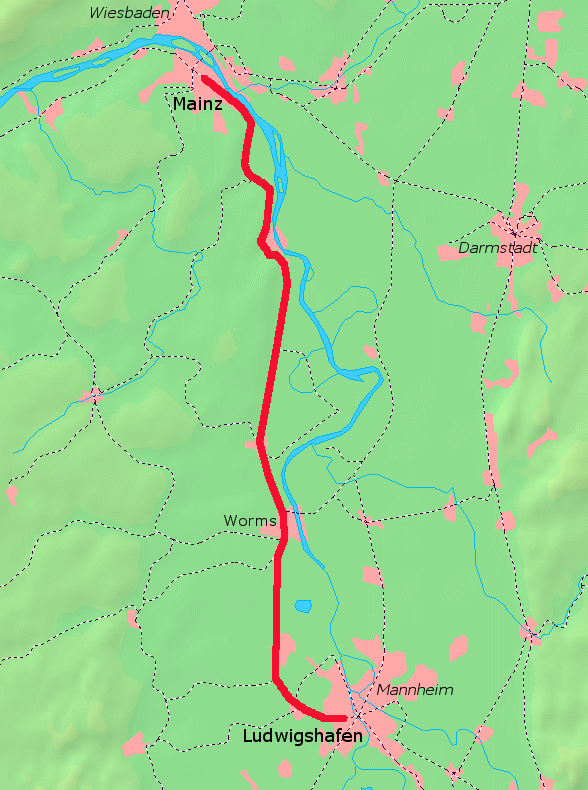

Overview
- Native name: Bahnstrecke Mainz-Ludwigshafen
- Status: Operational
- Owner: Deutsche Bahn
- Line number: 3522
- Locale: Rhineland-Palatinate
- Termini: Mainz Hauptbahnhof; Ludwigshafen Hauptbahnhof
- Stations: 16

Service
- Type: Heavy rail, Passenger/freight rail Regional rail, Intercity rail
- Route number: 660
- Operator: DB Bahn

History
- Opened: 15 November 1853

Technical
- Line length: 67.3 km (41.8 mi)
- Number of tracks: Double track
- Track gauge: 1,435 mm (4 ft 8 1/2 in) standard gauge
- Electrification: 15 kV 16.7 Hz
- Operating speed: 160 km/h (maximum)

The Mainz–Worms–Ludwigshafen Railway connects Mainz via Worms to Ludwigshafen in the German state of Rhineland-Palatinate From there trains cross the Rhine via Mannheim or run south towards Speyer. It was opened in 1853 and is one of the oldest railways in Germany.

== History ==
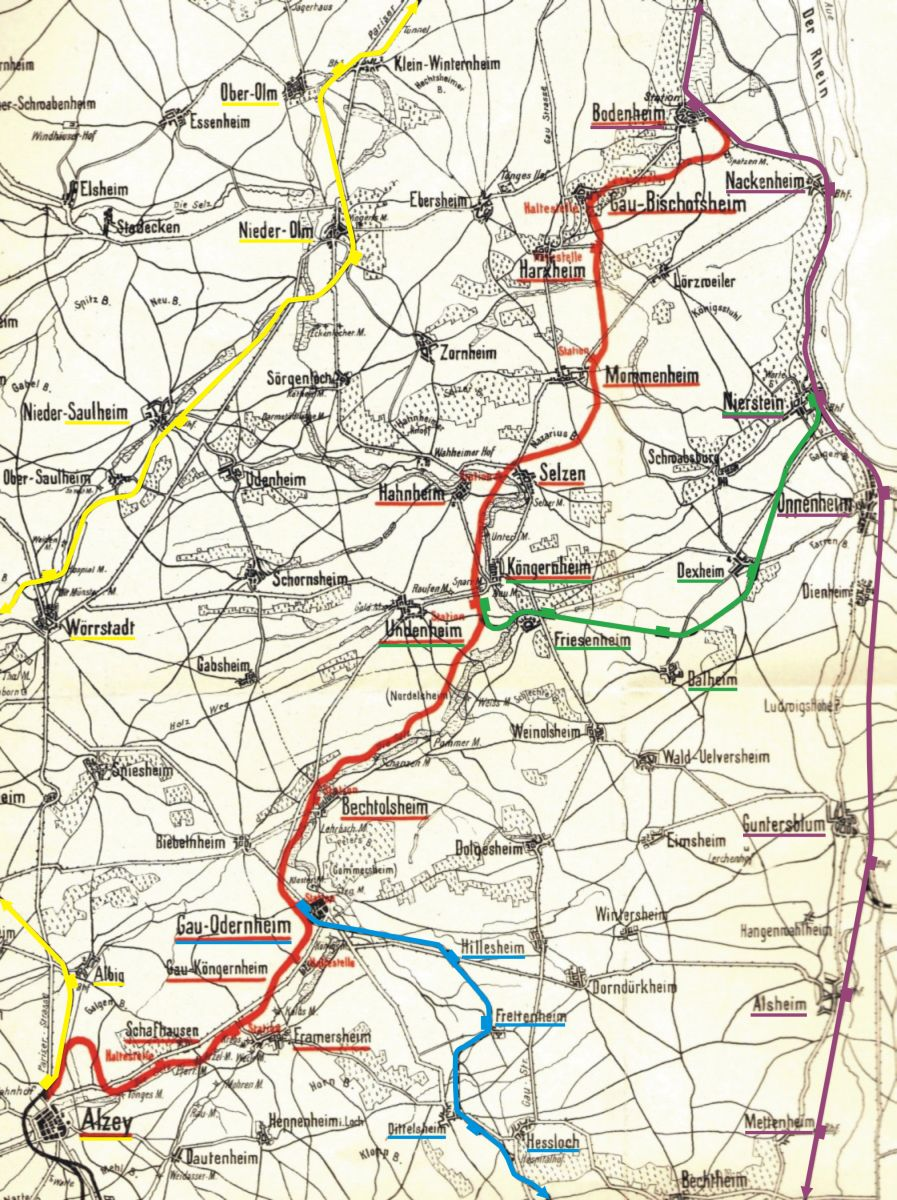
Mainz–Worms–Ludwigshafen line in purple

The first proposals for building a railway line west of the Rhine between Mainz and Worms, dated back to the 1830s, shortly after the opening of the first German railway line between Nuremberg and Fürth. This line was promoted by the governments of Bavaria (which then included the territory involved) and France. They later dropped the plan for financial and military reasons. Plans for the line did not resume until 1844.

A route through Alzey was discarded in favour of a direct alignment along the Rhine (However, this route was later built as well, now forming the Mainz–Alzey railway and the Rheinhessen Railway). In 1845, the Hessian Ludwig Railway Company (German: Hessische Ludwigsbahn) received a concession to build and operate this route. In 1848 work on the line started. The first section of the line between Mainz and Worms was opened on 23 March 1853 and it was completed to Ludwigshafen on 15 November 1853.

The line was integrated in the Rhine-Neckar S-Bahn as line S6 on 10 June 2018 from Mainz to Mannheim. This forms part of a planned through line via Heidelberg to the Elsenz Valley Railway or the Schwarzbach Valley Railway. In addition to the modernisation of existing stations, this involved two new stations in Dienheim and Frankenthal-Süd.

== Operations ==
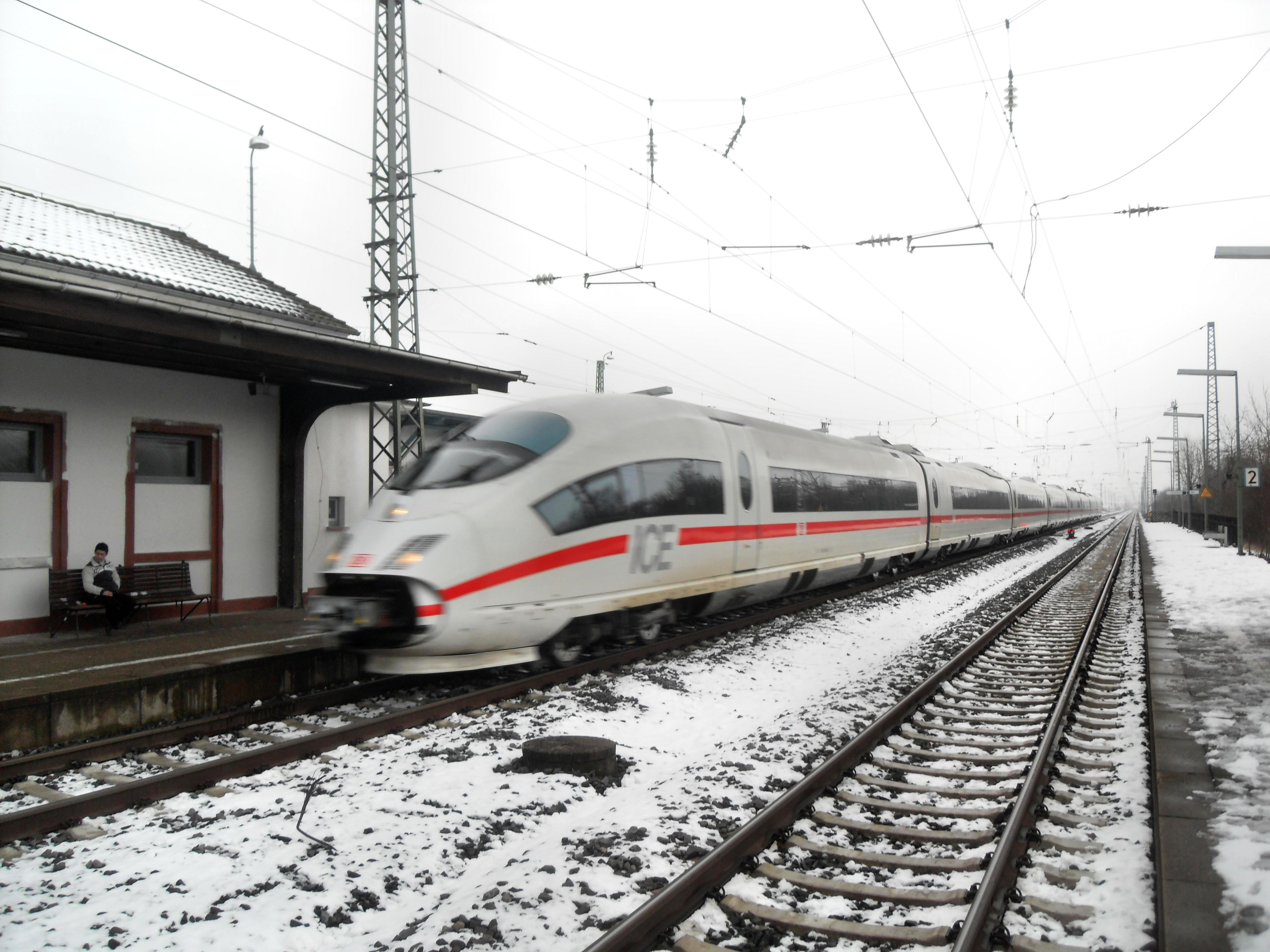
Intercity-Express train in Guntersblum station

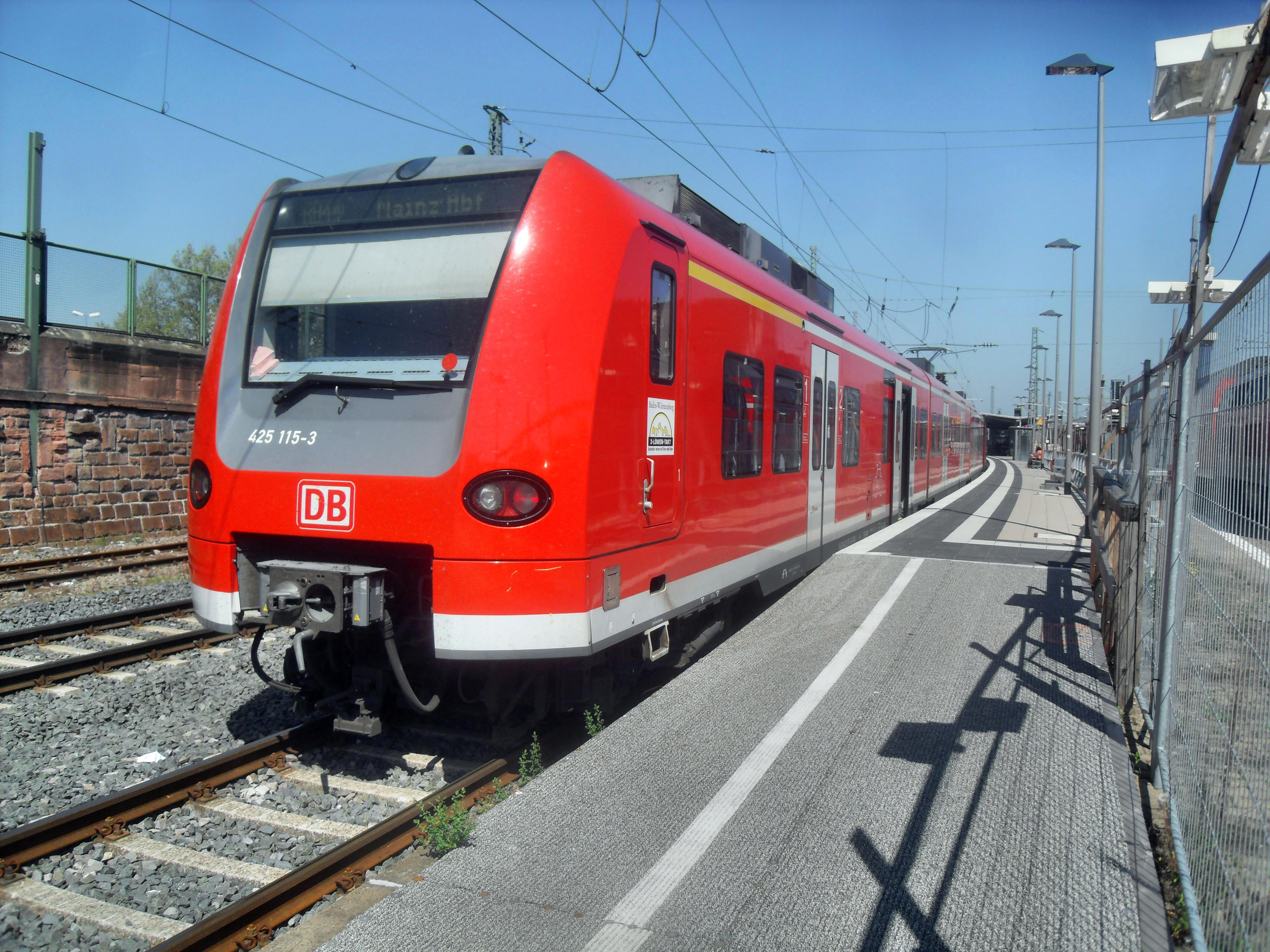
Class 425 electric multiple units in Worms Hauptbahnhof

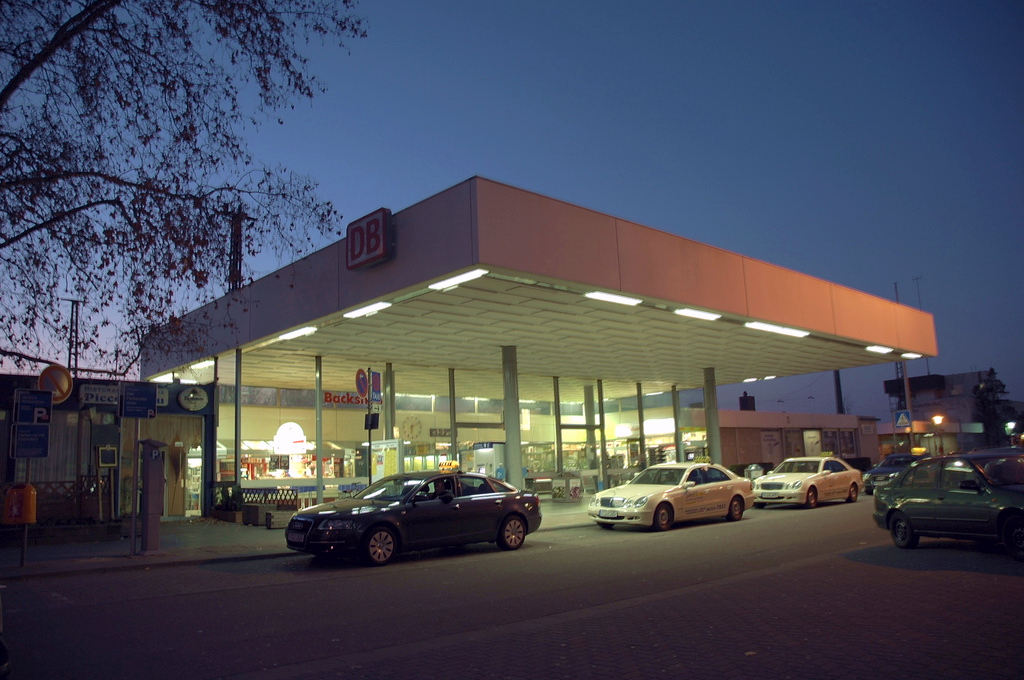
Frankenthal Central Station

The double-track, electrified line is still of great importance for regional and long-distance traffic. A number of long-distance Intercity or Intercity-Express trains run from Koblenz or Wiesbaden on the Mainz-Mannheim line.

In addition, there is a dense network of regional trains: in addition to the half-hourly Regionalbahn service on the line, there is a Regional-Express service via Speyer to Karlsruhe. Increased regular interval services in the 1990s led to an increase in ridership. Until 2004, regional services were provided by locomotive-hauled trains. Since then, class 425 electric multiple units have been used.

Since December 2014, Regional-Express trains have run at two-hour intervals between Mainz Hbf and Mannheim Hbf with stops in Worms and Frankenthal, combining with the existing Regional-Express connection between Mainz Hauptbahnhof and Karlsruhe Hauptbahnhof on the section between Mainz Hauptbahnhof and Ludwigshafen (Rhein) Hauptbahnhof to form an hourly service. The Regional-Express service from Mainz via Ludwigshafen am Rhein to Karlsruhe (RE 4) and Mannheim (RE 14) have also been operated since December 2014 as part of the Süwex network with class 429 railcars.

The stations of Dienheim and Frankenthal Süd were opened on 14 June 2015.

Line RB 44 became line S 6 of the Rhine-Neckar S-Bahn at the "minor timetable change" on 10 June 2018. Since the timetable change on 9 December 2018, the S 6 S-Bahn services mostly run every half hour. In the future, a connection from Mainz via Worms and Mannheim to Heidelberg is planned. Also trains on Regional-Express lines 4 and 14 have run via the Taunus Railway to Frankfurt Hauptbahnhof since 9 December 2018. The initially proposed stations of Worms Nord and Worms Süd are not to not being built for the time being.

There are the following local services:

- RE 4: (Frankfurt am Main – Hochheim am Main –) Mainz – Worms – Ludwigshafen (Rhein) Hbf – Speyer – Karlsruhe (every two hours)
- RE 14: (Frankfurt am Main – Hochheim am Main –) Mainz – Worms – Ludwigshafen (Rhein) Mitte – Mannheim (every two hours)
- S 6: Mainz – Worms – Ludwigshafen am Rhein – Mannheim (mostly every half hour).
