= Monsheim station =

Railway station in Monsheim, Germany

Monsheim
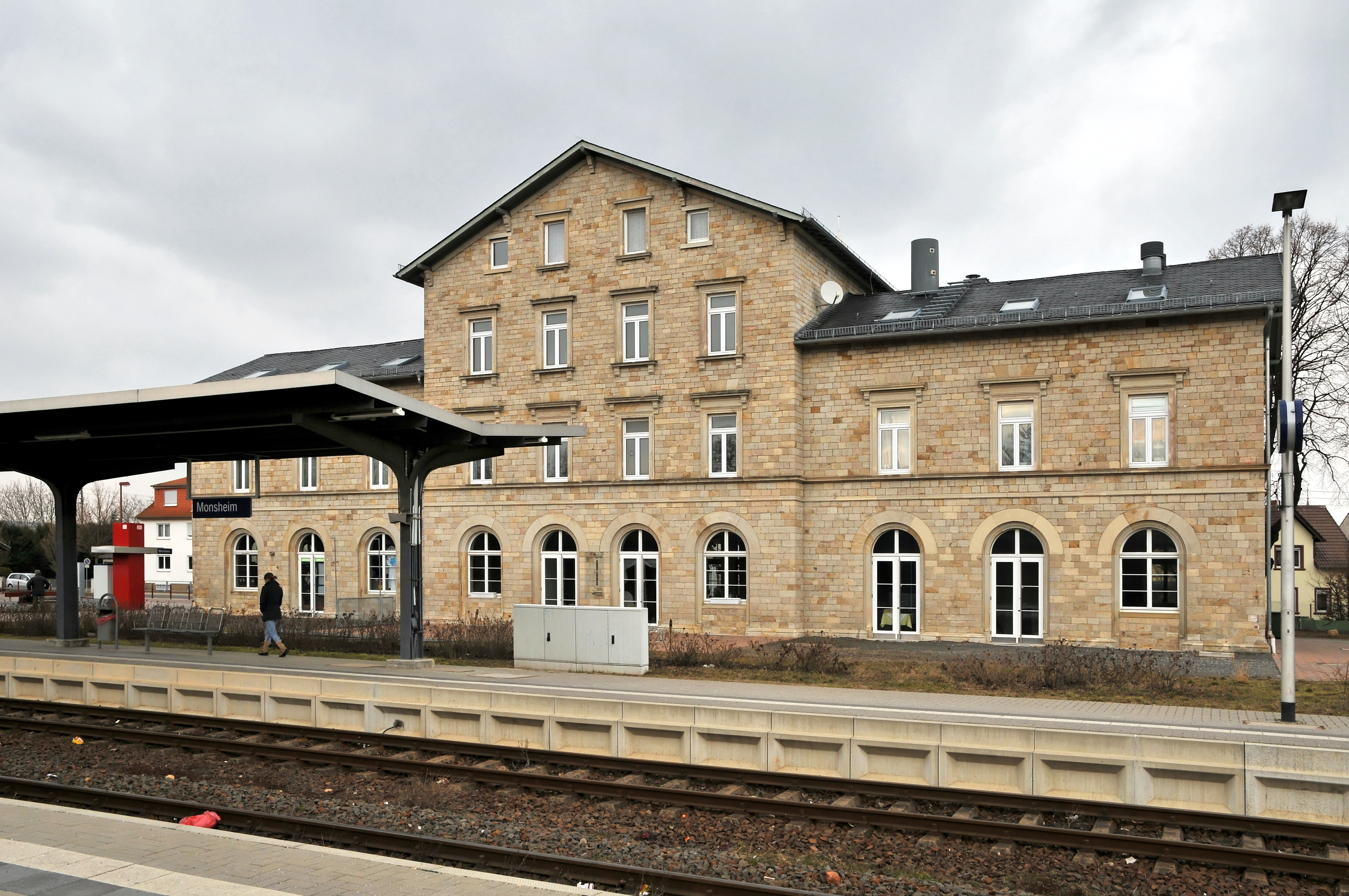

General information
- Location: Monsheim, Rhineland-Palatinate; Germany
- Coordinates: 49°38′01″N 8°12′30″E
- Owner: Deutsche Bahn
- Operator: DB Netz; DB Station&Service
- Lines: Palatine Northern Railway (KBS 667); Rheinhessen Railway (KBS 662); Zeller Valley Railway (KBS 662.1)
- Platforms: 3

Construction
- Accessible: Platform 1 only

Other information
- Station code: 4168
- DS100 code: FMSH
- IBNR: 8000663
- Category: 5
- Fare zone: VRN: 42; RNN: 377 (VRN transitional tariff)
- Website: www.bahnhof.de

History
- Opened: 1864; 162 years ago

Services
Preceding station	DB Regio Mitte	Following station
Flörsheim-Dalsheim towards Bingen Stadt	RB 35	Pfeddersheim towards Worms Hbf
Hohensülzen towards Neustadt (Weinstraße) Hbf	RB 45	Terminus
Location

Monsheim station is in the municipality of Monsheim in the Alzey-Worms district of the German state of Rhineland-Palatinate. It is at the junction of the Rheinhessen Railway, the Palatine Northern Railway and the Zeller Valley Railway. The station’s entrance building is protected as a monument. It is classified by Deutsche Bahn as a category 5 station.

== History ==
The first Monsheim station was opened in 1864 simultaneously with the section of the Rheinhessen Railway from Worms. The importance of the station rose sharply as a result of the continuation of the construction of the Rheinhessen line via Alzey to Bingen and the connection of the Palatine Northern Railway and the Zeller Valley Railway. As a result, a new station building was built in 1885.

The station stopped being a railway junction with the closure of the Palatine Northern Railway between Grünstadt and Monsheim in 1984 and the Zeller Valley Railway in 1985. However, it became a railway junction again in 1995 when services were restored on the Palatine Northern Railway to Monsheim. Since 2001, excursion traffic has operated again on the Zeller Valley Railway on Sundays, but a resumption of regular services on the line is not currently proposed.

Coinciding with the reactivation of the Palatine Northern Railway, the station was transformed into the Monsheim “environmental station" (Umweltbahnhof) as a Rhineland-Palatinate pilot project. Key elements of the concept were the reuse of the reception building and goods shed, the construction of a bus station and commuter parking and the re-use of disused railway land south and north of the railway tracks.

== Platforms ==
The once extensive railway tracks were largely dismantled after 1984. The “home” platform and the adjacent track were abandoned during its conversion into an environmental station and filled in, so that the station now has only three of its original five platform tracks.

== Entrance building ==
The station building was built in 1885 in an historicist style. The original three-storey central block is flanked by two two-storey wings, with the gables not facing the platform. The ground floor is accented by round-arched windows and doors.

A goods hall was located to the east of the entrance building from around 1900; it was rebuilt in 2004/05 as the village hall.

== Operations ==
Monsheim station is a node of the Rhineland-Palatinate integrated regular interval timetable, with trains meeting there on the hour. Since 2011, Deutsche Bahn Regionalbahn services have run from Monsheim to Worms, Bingen via Alzey and Grünstadt hourly. On weekdays services to Worms run every half-hour. On summer Sundays, an excursion services runs on to Zeller Valley Railway, continuing to Hochspeyer.

Line	Route	Frequency
RB 35	Worms Hbf – Flörsheim-Dalsheim – Monsheim – Alzey – Armsheim – Gau-Bickelheim – Gensingen-Horrweiler – Bingen (Rhein) Stadt	Hourly
RB 45	Grünstadt – Albsheim (Eis) – Bockenheim-Kindenheim – Hohensülzen – Monsheim	Hourly
