= Mannheim–Saarbrücken railway =

Rail line in Germany

Mannheim−Saarbrücken railway
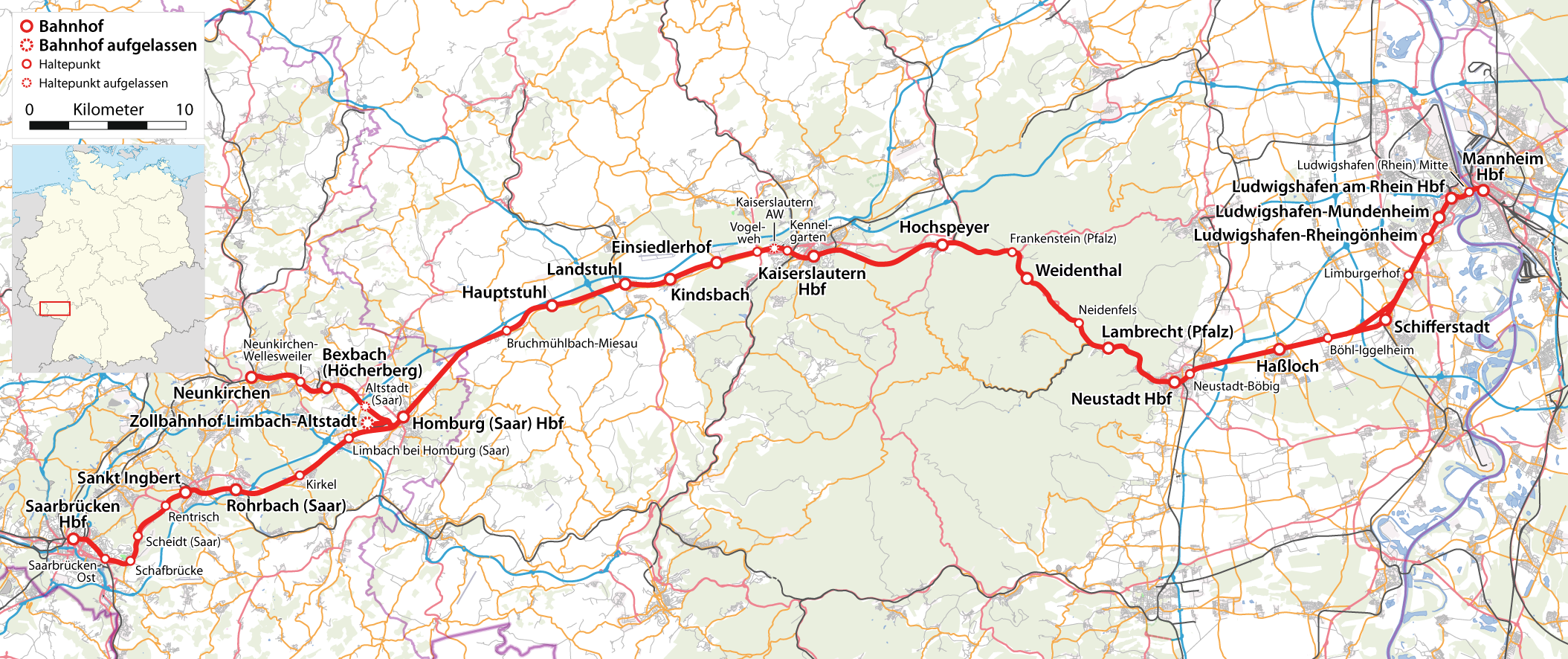

Overview
- Native name: Pfälzische Ludwigsbahn
- Line number: 3250 (Saarbrücken–Homburg); 3280 (Homburg–Ludwigshafen); 3401 (Böhl-Iggelheim junction–Mannheim Hbf)
- Locale: Baden-Württemberg, Rhineland-Palatinate and Saarland, Germany

Service
- Route number: 670

Technical
- Line length: 130.5 km (81.1 mi)
- Number of tracks: 2 or more throughout
- Track gauge: 1,435 mm (4 ft 8 1/2 in) standard gauge
- Minimum radius: 281 m (922 ft)
- Electrification: 15 kV/16.7 Hz AC overhead
- Operating speed: 160 km/h (99 mph) (maximum)
- Maximum incline: (Saarbrücken – Ludwigshafen) 1.09%; (Ludwigshafen – Mannheim) 2.5%

The Mannheim–Saarbrücken railway (German: Pfälzische Ludwigsbahn) is a railway in the German states of Baden-Württemberg, Rhineland-Palatinate and the Saarland that runs through Ludwigshafen am Rhein, Neustadt an der Weinstraße, Kaiserslautern, Homburg and St. Ingbert It is the most important railway line that runs through the Palatinate. It serves both passenger and freight transport and carries international traffic.

The route was largely opened from 1847 to 1849 as the Pfälzische Ludwigsbahn (Palatine Ludwig Railway) between Ludwigshafen and Bexbach. The line is identical with the Ludwig Railway between Ludwigshafen and Homburg and it therefore often referred to as the Pfälzische Ludwigsbahn. The remaining sections went into operation between 1867 and 1904. The line was electrified from 1960 to 1964. In its present form, the line has existed since 1969, when Deutsche Bundesbahn moved the Ludwigshafen Hauptbahnhof to its current location. Deutsche Bahn operates the route under timetable number 670. Some sections of the line are cleared for speeds of 200 kilometres per hour for the ICE and TGV services between Paris, Kaiserslautern, Mannheim and Frankfurt. The Mannheim–Homburg section was integrated in the network of the Rhine-Neckar S-Bahn in two stages in 2003 and 2006.

== History ==
Historically, the trunk line from Mannheim to Saarbrücken is a combination of different lines, due to the former Bavarian-Prussian national border and the interests of the towns along the Blies and the Würzbach in the shortest possible connection between Homburg and Saarbrücken. The Rhine, which formed the land border between Baden and Bavaria, had to be crossed between Ludwigshafen and Mannheim. For these reasons the line was completed in its present form only in 1904, with the exception of the relocation of the Ludwigshafen Hauptbahnhof in 1969. This is reflected in the chainage. The initial line was gradually opened from 1847 to 1849 as the Palatine Ludwig Railway (Pfälzische Ludwigsbahn) between Ludwigshafen and Bexbach. With the exception of the western Homburg–Bexbach section, it is now part of the Mannheim–Saarbrücken main line.

=== Ludwigshafen–Homburg ===
The initial planning of a railway line in the north–south direction within the Palatinate, which had belonged to Bavaria since 1816, was set aside for an east–west line, which was mainly promoted by Palatine entrepreneurs as facilitating the transport of Saar coal to the Rhine. The planners revised their initial considerations of St. Ingbert as the western terminus, under pressure from Prussia, which wanted to have the long-term connection to Saarbrücken passing as far as possible over its own territory. That is why the planners considered Bexbach, with an extension via Neunkirchen and the Sulzbach valley. A suggestion that the railway line run via Zweibrücken and from there along the Schwarzbach via Rodalben, Annweiler and Langenkandel on the Rhine, did not proceed. The eastern terminus was disputed between Speyer, the capital of the Palatinate and the emerging port and trading centre of Rheinschanze. A memorandum supporting the interests of Speyer argued that it was an old trading town, whereas Rheinschanze was just a military base that would merely serve the transfer of goods. These endeavours were unsuccessful, as the part of the up-and-coming Rhine-Neckar Region to the east of the Rhine, especially Mannheim, was the focus of attention and the export of coal to the area beyond the Rhine was considered more important. Proposals for a line along the Dürkheim Valley also failed, since its side valleys were too low and, above all, the Frankensteiner Steige (Frankenstein climb) would have had too steep. This route would have required stationary steam engines and rope haulage to overcome the differences in altitude. For this reason it was decided to proceed with a route along the valley through Neustadt.

On 30 March 1838, some businessmen founded the "Bavarian railway company of the Palatine-Rheinschanze-Bexbach Railway" (Bayerische Eisenbahngesellschaft der Pfalz-Rheinschanz-Bexbacher Bahn) to develop the project. In May 1844, the company was renamed the Palatine Ludwig Railway Company (Pfälzische Ludwigsbahn-Gesellschaft). From March 1845, construction began under the leadership of Paul Denis. Coal from the Bexbach area would reach the industrial centres in the south of Germany and Switzerland via Rheinschanze. The line was named after the Bavarian King Ludwig I and the town of Ludwigshafen am Rhein, which was then developing from Rheinschanze. The opening of the Ludwigshafenn–Neustadt section took place on 11 June 1847, the Homburg–Kaiserslautern section followed on 2 July 1848 and the Kaiserslautern–Frankenstein section was completed on 2 December of that year. On 6 June of the following year, the Ludwig Railway reached Bexbach in the west. From August 1849, trains could run over the line from Ludwigshafen via Neustadt, Kaiserslautern and Homburg to Bexbach. The main line was completed to Neunkirchen in 1850 and two years later to Saarbrücken.

=== Mannheim – Ludwigshafen ===
Because of the rapid increase in traffic on both sides of the Rhine, there were calls for the construction of a line between Ludwigshafen and Mannheim in Baden from the end of the 1850s. In addition, there were plans for a Baden Odenwald Railway between Heidelberg and Würzburg, which was completed in 1866. In combination with this, a rail link across the Rhine would connect the Ludwig Railway with Bavarian Lower Franconia without crossing Württemberg. Added to this was that the upgrading of the Mainz pontoon bridge and the extension of the Appenweier–Kehl railway to Strasbourg in 1861 threatened to reduce the competitiveness of the Ludwig Railway.

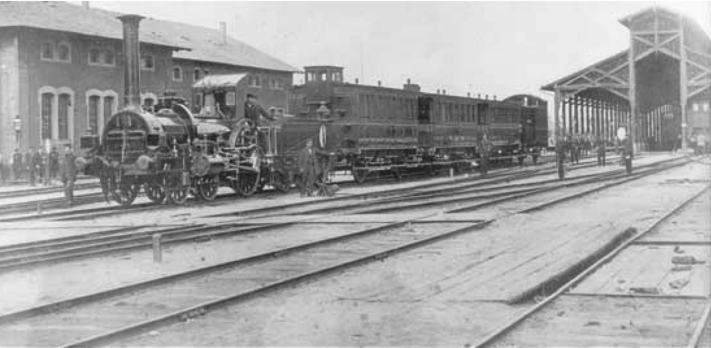
The opening of the Mannheim–Ludwigshafen section on 25 February 1867

In a treaty concluded at the beginning of 1862, the two countries agreed that Baden would take over the construction of the pylons and abutments. Bavaria was given responsibility for the superstructure including tracks and flooring. In July of that year, Baden and Bavarian representatives reached an agreement on the location of the bridge. This required the closure of the original Mannheim station, which was opened in 1840 at the current Tattersall tram stop north of the current Hauptbahnhof as the western terminus of the Baden main line. There was no consensus on this approach, so that further planning could only proceed at the beginning of 1864. The Ludwigshafen–Mannheim train ferry provided a provisional service from 1863. The ferry service quickly reached its limits, so there was strong support in both cities for a bridge. Construction began in February 1865 and the work went well. The masonry material was sourced from the quarries along the Haardt; The railway carried about 24.000 cubic metres of ashlar. The iron superstructure was installed in July 1866. This was followed by load testing of the bridge on 21 and 22 January 1867 and the first train crossed the Rhine bridge on 25 February. However, there were no festivities. The Rhine bridge was initially single track until the second track opened on 10 August 1867. The railway ran along the southern side of the bridge and the road along the northern side. Mannheim received a new station with the new line in 1876.

=== St. Ingbert – Saarbrücken ===
As early as the end of the 1860s, local committees were involved in the establishment of a connection from St. Ingbert to Saarbrücken. St. Ingbert had been connected to the railway network since 1867 by the Würzbach Railway (Würzbachbahn) which began in Schwarzenacker. In 1869, both the Bavarian and Prussian governments were approached by committees with related plans. Due to financial stringencies, Bavaria rejected direct intervention, but the Saarbrücken Committee agreed to take over the costs on condition that the line was linked to the Saarbrücken–Sarreguemines railway. The Franco-Prussian War, however, prevented the conclusion of a treaty.

After the end of the war, the construction of a main railway from Bruchsal via Germersheim, Landau and Zweibrücken to St. Ingbert was planned, which was finally built in the period from 1872 to 1877. The Palatinate Railway (Pfälzische Eisenbahnen), which the Palatine Ludwig Railway Company had been part of since 1870, benefitted from the adoption of an interest rate guarantee law on 28 April 1872. Nevertheless, the talks with Saarbrücken were difficult as the approach to the very busy St. Johann-Saarbrücken station and the allocation of railway operations caused problems. In 1877, a treaty that guaranteed the construction of the line was concluded. This meant that St. Ingbert station had to be completely rebuilt. It received a new entrance building and its tracks were raised one metre higher. Land was acquired in the winter of that year and the construction began in March of the following year. The connection was 12.568 kilometres long. The tracks were built partly over rocks, but major earth moving was necessary.

The connection was opened on 15 October 1879. It amounted to an extension of the Würzbach Railway (Schwarzenacker–St. Ingbert), which had been completed in 1866 and 1867 and branched off the Homburg–Zweibrücken railway. Its main purpose was to provide a connection for coal trains from the Saarbrücken area to the South Palatinate Railway (Südpfalzstrecke; Landau–Zweibrücken), which opened in 1875, to avoid the detour via Neunkirchen and Bexbach and a reversal in Homburg station. In this way the route used for transport of coal was shortened and the costs were reduced. The same thing applied to products from industrial towns such as Dillingen and Saarlouis, as well as from neighbouring Lorraine (then German Lothringen). In addition, this resulted in a shorter connection between Homburg and Saarbrücken than the previous route via Bexbach and Neunkirchen.

=== Homburg – St. Ingbert ===
The Hasseler Tunnel on the Würzbach Railway east of St. Ingbert became increasingly an operational problem due to its geological instability. The first option was a new lining for the existing tunnel, the second a new tunnel and the third a completely new route to Rohrbach that would not need a tunnel. Due to the strategic importance of the line, the Imperial Government intervened in the matter and chose the third option. Since the Palatinate Railway was not able to finance it fully, the Imperial Government subsidised the project. An approximately 5.7 kilometre long loop was built between Würzbach and St. Ingbert through Rohrbach and put in operation on 7 September 1895. The closing and dismantling of the direct connection from Würzbach to St. Ingbert followed and all trains ran on the new line between Hassel and Rohrbach.

Already during the planning of the Würzbach Railway both Homburg and St. Ingbert had originally promoted a connection by the shortest route, which was, however, opposed by the communities along the Blies and the Würzbach. For strategic reasons, the decision was made to build a direct link from Homburg via Limbach and Kirkel to Rohrbach. This line opened on 1 January 1904; at the same time a second track was built between Scheidt and Rohrbach. The line was initially designated as part of the Glan Valley Railway (Glantalbahn), which was opened on 1 May of the same year and was also built as a strategic railway.

=== Further development (1904–1919) ===
A connecting curve in the Saarbrücken district of Halberg from the Scheidt direction towards Brebach on the line to Saargemünd (the official name of Sarreguemines at the time) was commissioned on 29 July 1905. A flying junction was opened in 1907 on the Schifferstadt – Ludwigshafen section of the line between the stations of Mutterstadt and Schifferstadt, which had been rebuilt with four tracks, starting in 1899. This avoided the delays that trains had previously experienced in Schifferstadt. Railway telephones were installed on the Kaiserslautern–Homburg and St. Ingbert–Saarbrücken sections at this time. The Ludwigshafen–St. Ingbert section of line, together with the other railways within the Palatinate, were absorbed into the Royal Bavarian State Railways (Königlich Bayerische Staatseisenbahnen) on 1 January 1909.

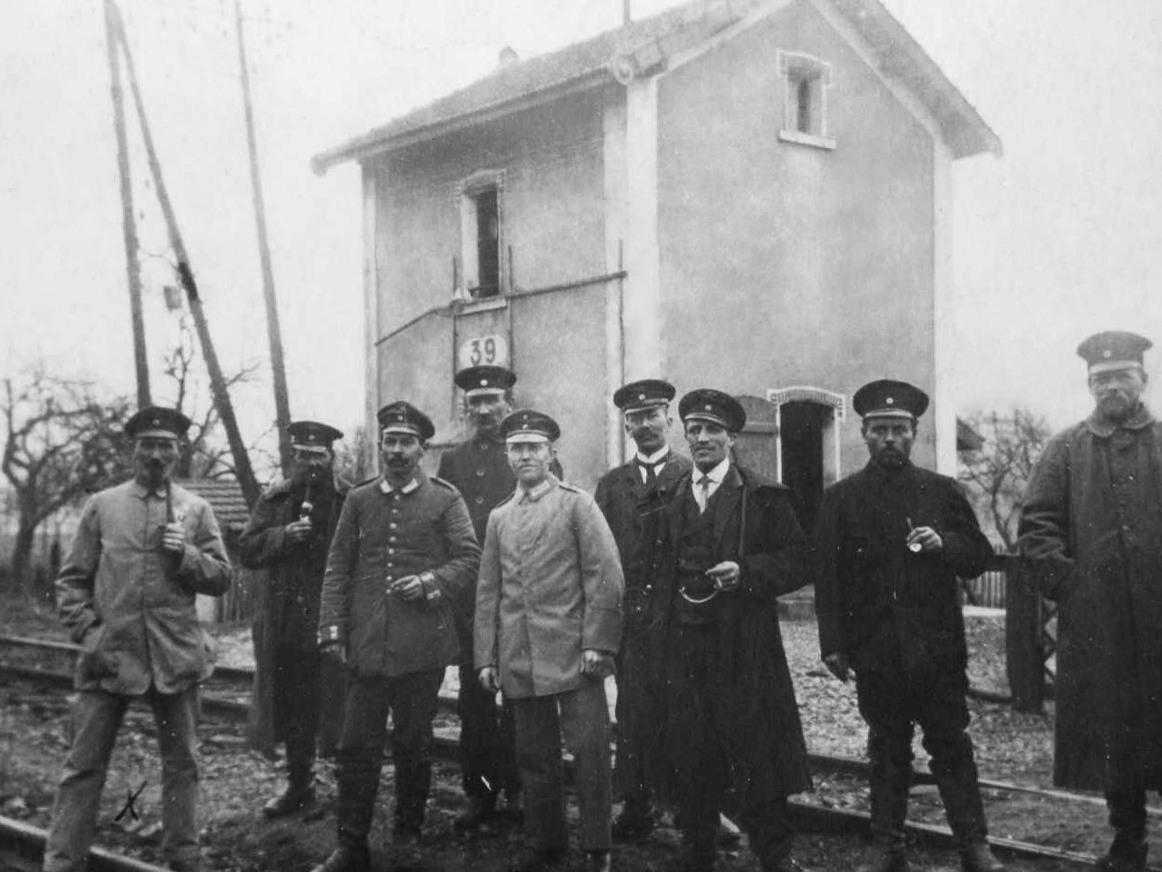
Railway workers at Einsiedlerhof station in 1914

In 1914, there were plans to upgrade the whole main line. The outbreak of the First World War prevented this. At the beginning of the war, numerous military trains ran over the line from 9 to 16 August. 40 trains ran from Mannheim on a daily basis, 20 of them continued to Saarbrücken and the rest ran onto the Maximilian Railway in Neustadt. Between Kaiserslautern and Saarbrücken, 20 trains per day came from Worms. Some trains also reached Saarbrücken from the Glan Valley. 40 trains a day starting in Germersheim, ran on the Rohrbach–Saarbrücken section. Scheduled passenger services had to be temporarily withdrawn, especially in the Saarbrücken area. Passenger services only recommenced after the operation of military trains had declined. The further course of the war affected the line and some of its structures.

After Germany had lost the war and the French military had invaded the Palatinate, the section of the line west of Hauptstuhl was closed to passenger traffic on 1 December 1918; three days later, however, it was reopened to passenger traffic. Rail operations across the Rhine to Mannheim was blockaded from 6 December. Freight traffic to Baden was permitted again from May of the following year and passenger trains ran again between Mannheim and Ludwigshafen from 10 August.

=== Between the First and Second World Wars (1920–1945) ===
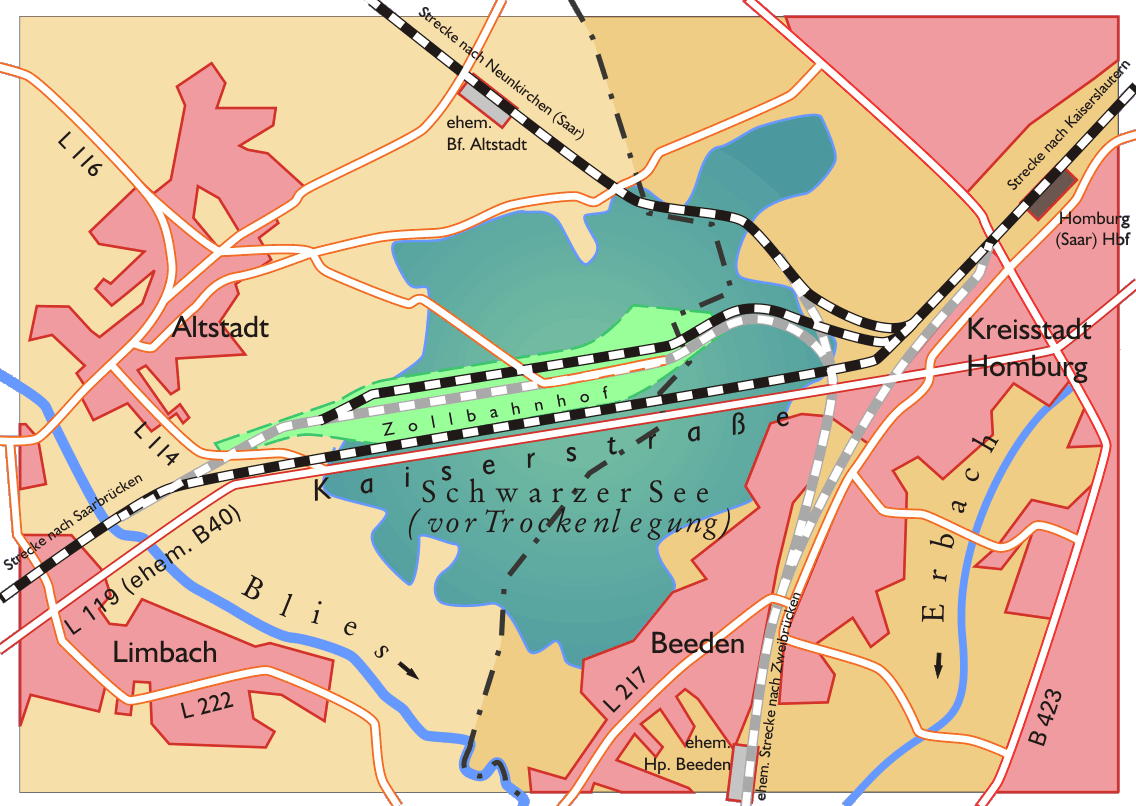
Homburg (Saar) West customs station

The Homburg–Saarbrücken section became part of the newly created Territory of the Saar Basin (Saarbeckengebiet) on 10 March 1920, which was founded at the initiative of the victorious powers under the Treaty of Versailles with a duration of 15 years under League of Nations control. During this period it was within the French customs territory. Consequently, the Sarr Railway (Saareisenbahn) was administered by the Territory, which consisted of the former Prussian Eisenbahndirektion (railway division) of Saarbrücken. In this context, the Homburg (Saar) West customs station (Zollbahnhof Homburg (Saar) West), which handled freight traffic, was built. Customs controls for passenger traffic were handled in the stations of Homburg and Eichelscheid. The newly founded Deutsche Reichsbahn (DR) managed the remaining part of the line and integrated it into the newly founded Reichsbahn division (Reichsbahndirektion) of Ludwigshafen two years later. As early as 1920, DR put into operation the Einsiedlerhof marshalling yard, which replaced Kaiserslautern yard. The two main railway tracks immediately west of Kaiserslautern were rerouted directly north of the marshalling yard because of the limited space available.

On 7 March 1923, the so-called Regiebetrieb (military operation) commenced, which meant that the railway was operated by the French military until the beginning of 1924. In this context, operations were blockaded from 30 May to 7 June. In 1926, a two-track freight railway was established between Kaiserslautern and the Einsiedlerhof marshalling yard. It included several halts, which were predominantly used for operational purposes. It was clear that the Rhine Bridge was no longer able to cope with the heavier locomotives. For this reason, a new railway bridge was built immediately adjacent to the 1867 bridge; it was opened in 1932. From 1933, the Communist resistance to Nazism used the Homburg (Saar) West customs station in particular for their purposes. With the reabsorption of the Saar area into the German Reich in 1935, the Reichsbahn was responsible for the whole route and the customs controls were removed. The Saareisenbahn was renamed as the Reichsbahndirektion Saarbrücken. This led to the gradual dissolution of the railway division of Ludwigshafen over the next two years. The Saarbrücken–Hochspeyer section came under the control of the railway division of Saarbrücken in 1936, the rest with effect from April 1937 came under the control of the railway division of Mainz.

After the outbreak of World War II on 1 September 1939, the line was again used by numerous military transports; as early as 1938 deportations to Dachau had taken place in Kaiserslautern and Ludwigshafen. From 1943 onwards the line was regularly exposed to bombardment, initially the railway lines in Saarbrücken and Ludwigshafen were affected. This was followed by the bombing of Kaiserslautern and Homburg in 1944 and St. Ingbert towards the end of the year. As a result, railway installations were considerably affected. The entrance building of Kaiserslautern Hauptbahnhof was, for example, almost completely destroyed on 28 September and 18 December. The same was true for Hauptbahnhof Homburg. Lambrecht (Pfalz) station was destroyed by fire in March 1945 during combat operations.

On 20 March 1945, the Wehrmacht destroyed the bridge over the Rhine to slow the Allied advance. After the Western Front reached the Palatinate in March 1945, the US Army resumed operations on the section of the line to the west of the Rhine to procure supplies. The first trains reached Ludwigshafen from Pirmasens via Landau and Neustadt on 25 March. From the end of March onwards, a single-track pile bridge was built for railway traffic between Mannheim and Ludwigshafen and was put into operation by the Seventh United States Army at the end of April. From June, the bridge of 1867 had temporarily taken into railway operations again. The flying junction between Schifferstadt and Limburgerhof, which had been affected by the combat operations, was taken out of service and the line now consisted of only two tracks in this area. The Halberg–Brebach connecting curve, which was opened in 1905 to the east of Saarbrücken, was closed and then dismantled.

=== Post-war period, electrification and reconstruction in Ludwigshafen (1945–1971) ===
In August 1945, the route was released for passenger traffic. The section of the line to the west of the Rhine came to under the control of the Vereinigung der Südwestdeutschen Eisenbahnen (Union of south-west German railways) from 1947 to 1949 during the French occupation. The Homburg–Saarbrücken section once again became part of the territory of Saarland, the rail network of which had its own administration from 1947, initially called the Saarländische Eisenbahnen (Saarland railways, SEB) and, from 1951, the Eisenbahnen des Saarlandes (Railways of the Saarland, EdS). Homburg became a customs station again. From 1949, Deutsche Bundesbahn (DB) administered the section east of Homburg and integrated it into the Bundesbahn division of Mainz, which was assigned all railway lines within the newly created state of Rhineland-Palatinate.

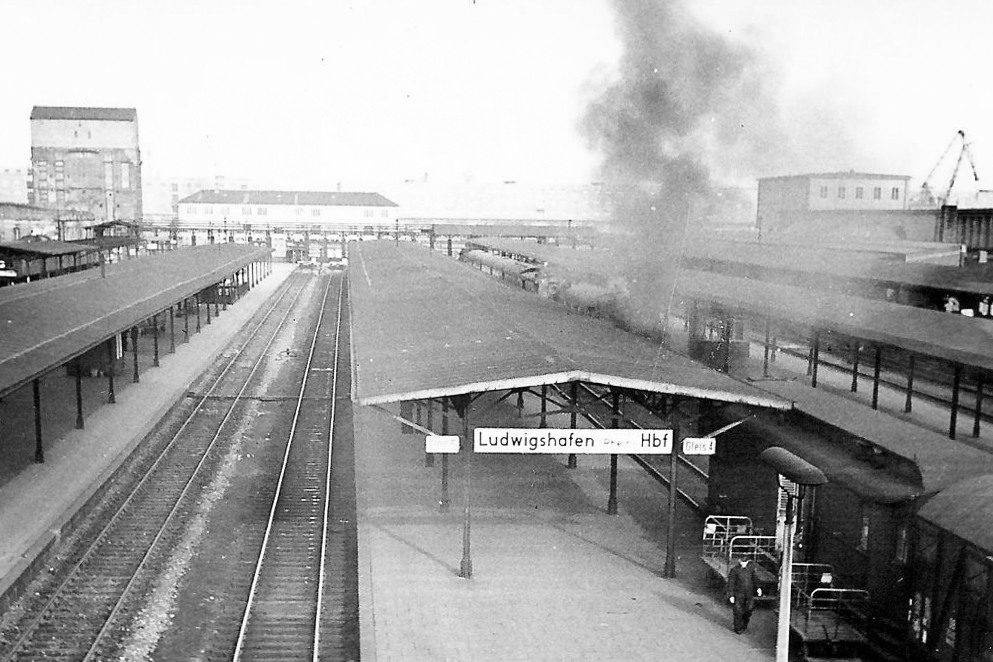
Old Ludwigshafen Hauptbahnhof in 1958. In 1969, the original terminal station was replaced by a through station, which was built further west.

At the turn of the year in 1954/1955, the DB restored the Rhine crossing to its condition in 1932. With the integration of Saarland into the Federal Republic of Germany, it became responsible for the whole line; the Bundesbahn division of Saarbrücken replaced the EdS. The Germersheim Rhine Bridge, which was rebuilt in March 1945, contributed to the fact that through traffic increasingly concentrated on the main line from Mannheim to Saarbrücken. In May 1959, the Bundesbahn established a connection between Mundenheim and Mannheim to bypass Ludwigshafen Hauptbahnhof.

Because of its great importance for long-distance traffic, the electrification of the line began in 1960. Corresponding plans already existed immediately after the war on the French side for the Saarland section, in order to link it more closely to France. Electric locomotives could operate over the Saarbrücken–Homburg section from 8 March 1960 and on the Homburg–Kaiserslautern section from 18 May 1961. The electrification of the remaining section had been delayed mainly because of the numerous tunnels between Kaiserslautern and Neustadt that had to be enlarged. For this reason, this section was temporary only accessible on a single-track basis; the trains were allowed to run at 40 kilometres per hour at most. Due to the restricted capacity, several freight trains ran over the Landau–Rohrbach and Langmeil–Monsheim railways towards Worms from 20 March 1960. The line could be operated electrically along its whole length from 12 March 1964. The flying junction that had existed since 1907 north of Schifferstadt was demolished with the electrification. The tracks between Limburgerhof and Ludwigshafen that had been used exclusively for through freight traffic since 1899 had already been abandoned and were used for the storage of freight wagons.

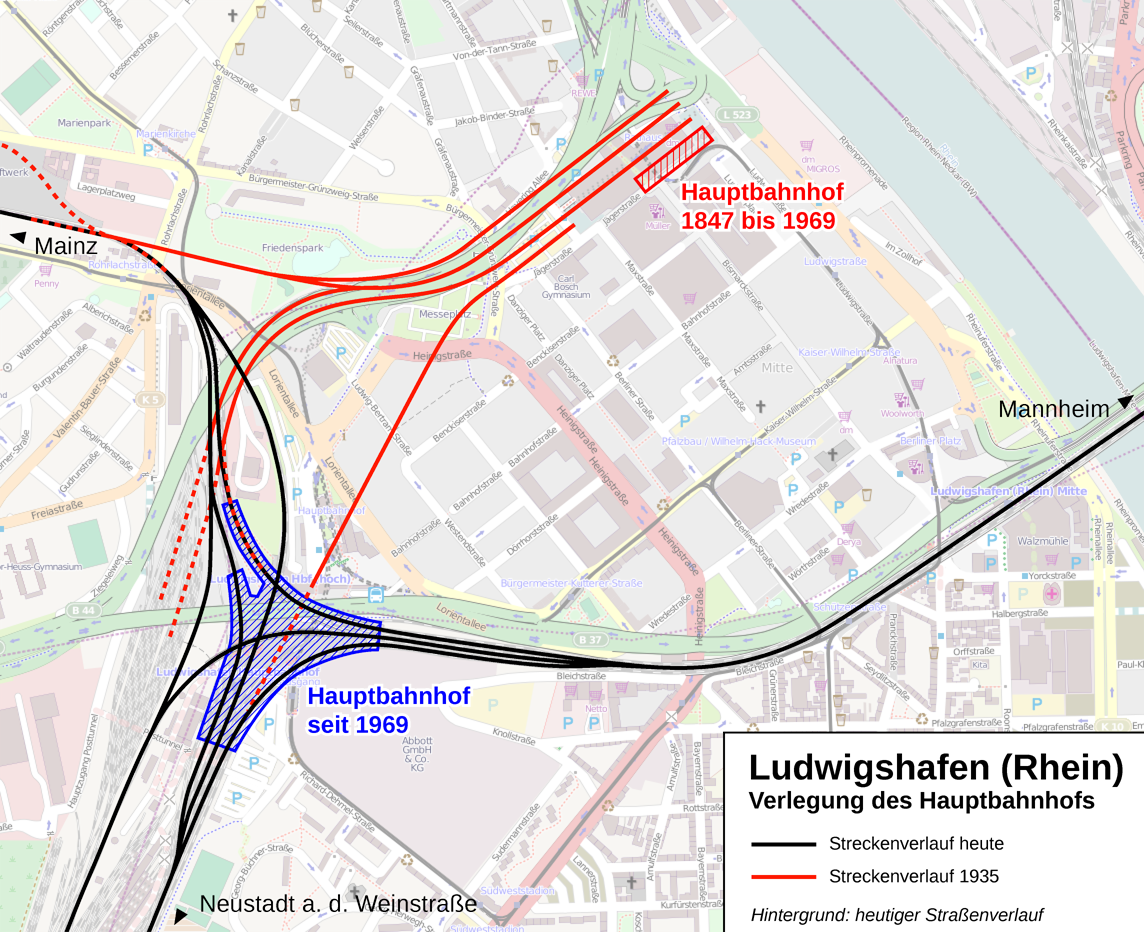
Ludwigshafen (Rhein) Hauptbahnhof before and after its transfer in 1969

Ludwigshafener Hauptbahnhof was an operational obstacle because of its construction as a terminus. In the early 1960s, construction work for a through station started at a new location. DB took it into operation in May 1969 and it was officially opened on 1 June. Its predecessor was then demolished along with the associated railway tracks. With the dissolution of the railway division of Mainz on 1 June 1971, the Ludwigshafen–Frankenstein section was transferred to the responsibility of the railway division of Karlsruhe. From 1 August of that year, the railway division of Saarbrücken was responsible for the entire section of the line from immediately west of Frankenstein.

=== Expansion plans in the 1970s and 1990s ===
The development program for the network of Deutsche Bundesbahn presented in 1970 contained a newly built railway (Neubaustrecke) between Hochspeyer and Ludwigshafen on a straightened route by 1985. It would be ten kilometres shorter than the existing line. In the Frankenthal area there would be a link with the Mainz–Ludwigshafen railway. In the planning of mid-1971, the project for a new railway, which was to be built by 1985, was assigned the second highest priority. The Federal Transport Plan (Bundesverkehrswegeplan) of 1973 also contained plans for a new line between Kaiserslautern and Ludwigshafen. It was never built.

In 1985 and 1986, a Franco-German working group developed six options for the route of the LGV Est and the connecting routes from Germany. It examined various options for new and upgraded lines between Saarbrücken and Ludwigshafen. The only option involving an upgrade of the existing line, estimated to cost 415 million Deutsche Marks, would have enabled a travel time reduction of 21 minutes. A second option provided an additional section of new line through the Palatinate Forest with several tunnels; it would have reduced travel time by another seven minutes at an estimated additional cost of 865 million D-Marks. A third option with a new line between Saarbrücken and Hochspeyer largely parallel to Bundesautobahn 6 with an estimated cost of 1.8 billion D-Marks would have provided a travel time reduction of 18 minutes. These plans were not implemented. The Mannheim–Weidenthal section of the line was integrated in the Verkehrsverbund Rhein-Neckar (Rhien-Neckar transport association, VRN), founded in 1989. From 12 to 18 September 1990, the Operation Steel Box took place between Hauptstuhl and Ludwigshafen.

The transport ministers of Germany and France agreed on 22 May 1992 to build the Paris–Ostfrankreich–Süddeutschland (Paris–East France–South Germany, POS) high-speed railway, including the Mannheim–Saarbrücken railway. Subsequently, there was a limited upgrade. In the middle of 1993, an expert report was commissioned by the State of Rhineland-Palatinate and the Federal Ministry of Transport, which presented four different options for new and upgraded lines on the Hochspeyer–Neustadt section. The travel time improvements to be achieved were estimated to be between 1.43 minutes for selective improvements with an estimated cost of 10 million D-Marks and up to eight minutes with the construction of a new line at a cost of 1.39 billion D-Marks.

=== Developments since the railway reform ===
During the German rail reform, the line became the property of Deutsche Bahn on 1 January 1994. From 1995 onwards, Neustadt (Weinstr) Böbig halt, which is located in the eastern area of Neustadt Hauptbahnhof, could be served by trains on the Ludwigshafen–Neustadt line, although previously it had only been served by trains on the Palatine Northern Railway. In 1996, VRN tickets could be used as far as Kaiserslautern. From 1993 to 1999, the number of passengers on the Weidenthal–Neustadt section rose from 1500 to 3270 per day. Neidenfels station went into operation between Lambrecht and Weidenthal in 1998. In May of the same year, the Federal Government and Deutsche Bahn signed a financing agreement worth 351.4 million DM to upgrade the line between Mannheim and Saarbrücken. This work was expected to be completed by 2004. The first stage saw an upgrade for tilting trains with a top speed of 160 km/h. The tracks on the St. Ingbert–Kirkel and Neustadt an der Weinstraße–Ludwigshafen sections are now ready for a line speed of 200 kilometres per hour. A bypass was built, which has allowed long-distance passenger and freight trains to bypass Schifferstadt since 2003.

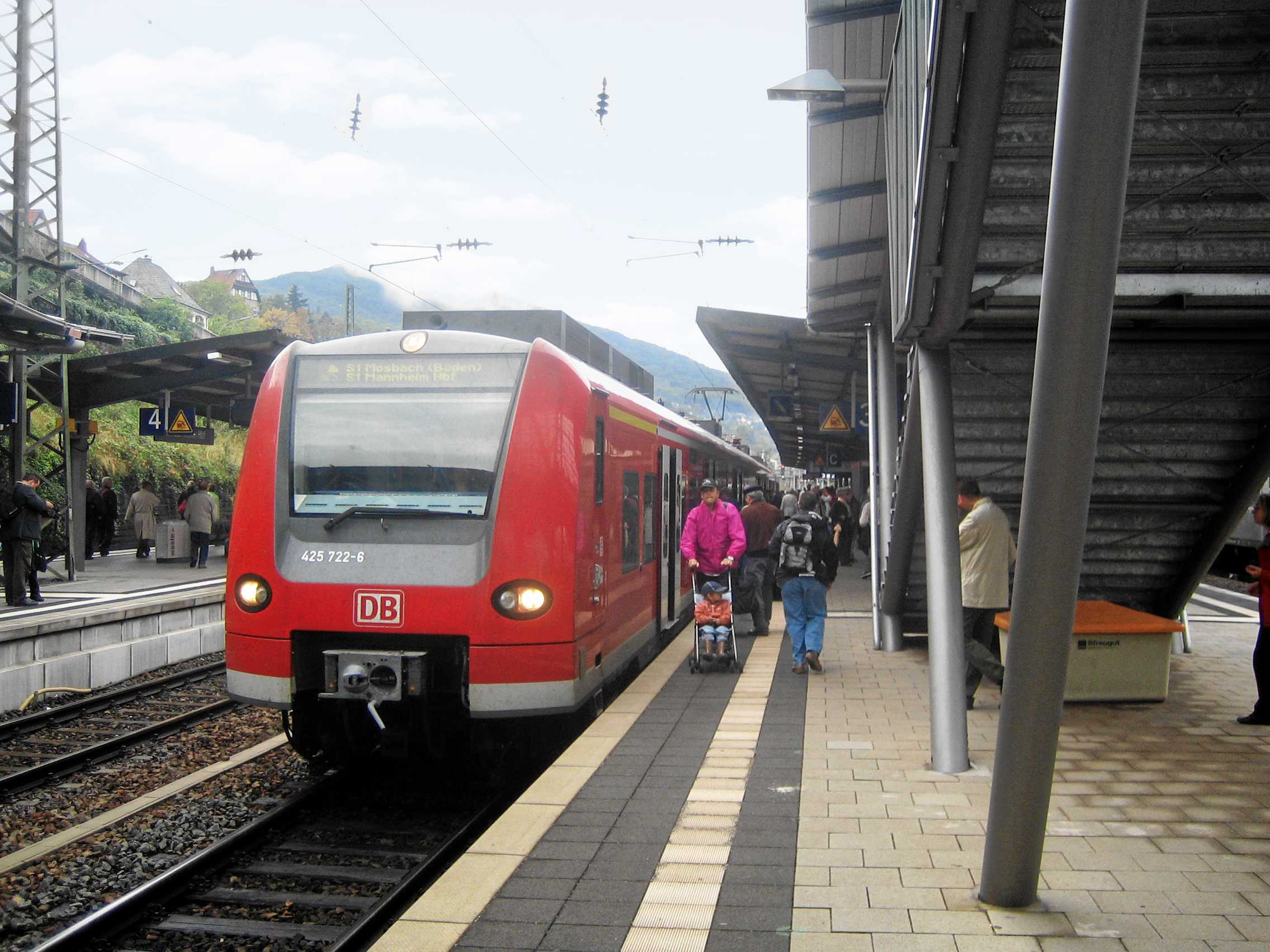
A train on line S1 of the Rhine-Neckar S-Bahn on its way to Mosbach (Baden) in Neustadt Hauptbahnhof

In 2000 the Bruchmühlbach-Miesau–Frankenstein section became part of the newly founded Westpfalz-Verkehrsverbund (Western Palatinate transport association, WVV). This became part of the VRN in 2006. The connecting curve at Kirkel to Geistkircher Hof had been closed by 2002. In December 2003, the Rhine-Neckar S-Bahn went into operation and the Mannheim–Kaiserslautern section of the line was integrated into it. Construction of a second two-track Rhine bridge between Mannheim and Ludwigshafen began in 1997. In 2006, the S-Bahn reached Homburg, which since then has formed the western terminus of the VRN. The introduction of the S-Bahn operation resulted in the modernisation of the stations along the line; The platforms have since been raised to a height of 76 centimetres to enable level access to the trains. The platforms between Ludwigshafen and Kaiserslautern are on average 210 metres-long, from Kaiserslautern they are 140 metres-long. Ludwigshafen (Rhein) Mitte station was built between the stations of Mannheim and Ludwigshafen Hauptbahnhof to overcome the great distance of the Hauptbahnhof from the city centre as a result of its relocation of in 1969. Weidenthal station was rebuilt with two new platforms about 800 metres closer to Frankenstein.

On 14 May 2004, DB and the then French infrastructure operator RFF signed a declaration of intent on the development of the infrastructure of the Paris – Saarbrücken – Ludwigshafen corridor (later extended to Frankfurt) with ERTMS and ETCS. Clearing for speeds above 160 km/h required train protection with ETCS Level 2 and should have been implemented by the end of 2008, but was later postponed. The then plans proposed the remote control of the route from the Deutsche Bahn operations centre in Karlsruhe. The contract for equipping the line with ETCS was awarded to Ansaldo in December 2007.

Around €50 million was spent on the upgrade in 2007. The route through the Palatinate Forest with its numerous tunnels between Neustadt an der Weinstraße and Kaiserslautern remained structurally unchanged contrary to the original plans. The Saarländischer Verkehrsverbund (Saarländ Transport Association, SaarVV) was founded in 2005; it is responsible for the Homburg–Saarbrücken section. Starting from mid-2010, the section between Ludwigshafen and Limburgerhof received a third track, which went into operation at the end of 2014. The freight track that have existed since 1900 were rebuilt.

The equipping of lines with ETCS Level 2 has been reserved for the German Unity Transport Project No. 8 (Verkehrsprojekt Deutsche Einheit Nr. 8, the rail corridor between Berlin and Nuremberg) and freight corridor A (Duisburg – Basel). The planning is being revised (as of 2014).

Some upgrading work is ongoing on the line and more sections of the line are being upgraded in order to have their maximum speed increased from 100 km/h or 160 km/h to 200 km/h. The forecasted completion date is end of 2019.

== Operations ==
=== Passenger services ===
==== During the development of the route ====
Since the Ludwig Railway was not opened continually from east to west, stage coaches, were used to take over the traffic between the two parts of the line. From 1850, the trains operated in the west to Neunkirchen and two years later to Saarbrücken. After the completion of the Mainz–Ludwigshafen railway in 1853, three passenger trains per day travelled between Homburg and Ludwigshafen on the Mainz–Paris route until Prussia opened the Nahe Valley Railway in 1860. After that the trains of the Ludwig Railway ended in Neunkirchen. Long-distance services on the east–west route were not possible in the following years since fast trains on the Ludwigshafen–Neunkirchen route stopped at almost all the stations on the line. Express trains ran between Ludwigshafen and Neustadt on the Basel–Cologne route for the first time in 1860. At the outbreak of the Franco-Prussian War, train traffic came to a standstill on 23 July 1870. On 19 August, services on the Palatine railways resumed with restrictions; express trains were allowed to run only if no military trains occupied the line. Local services had to operate at intervals that allowed military services to run freely.

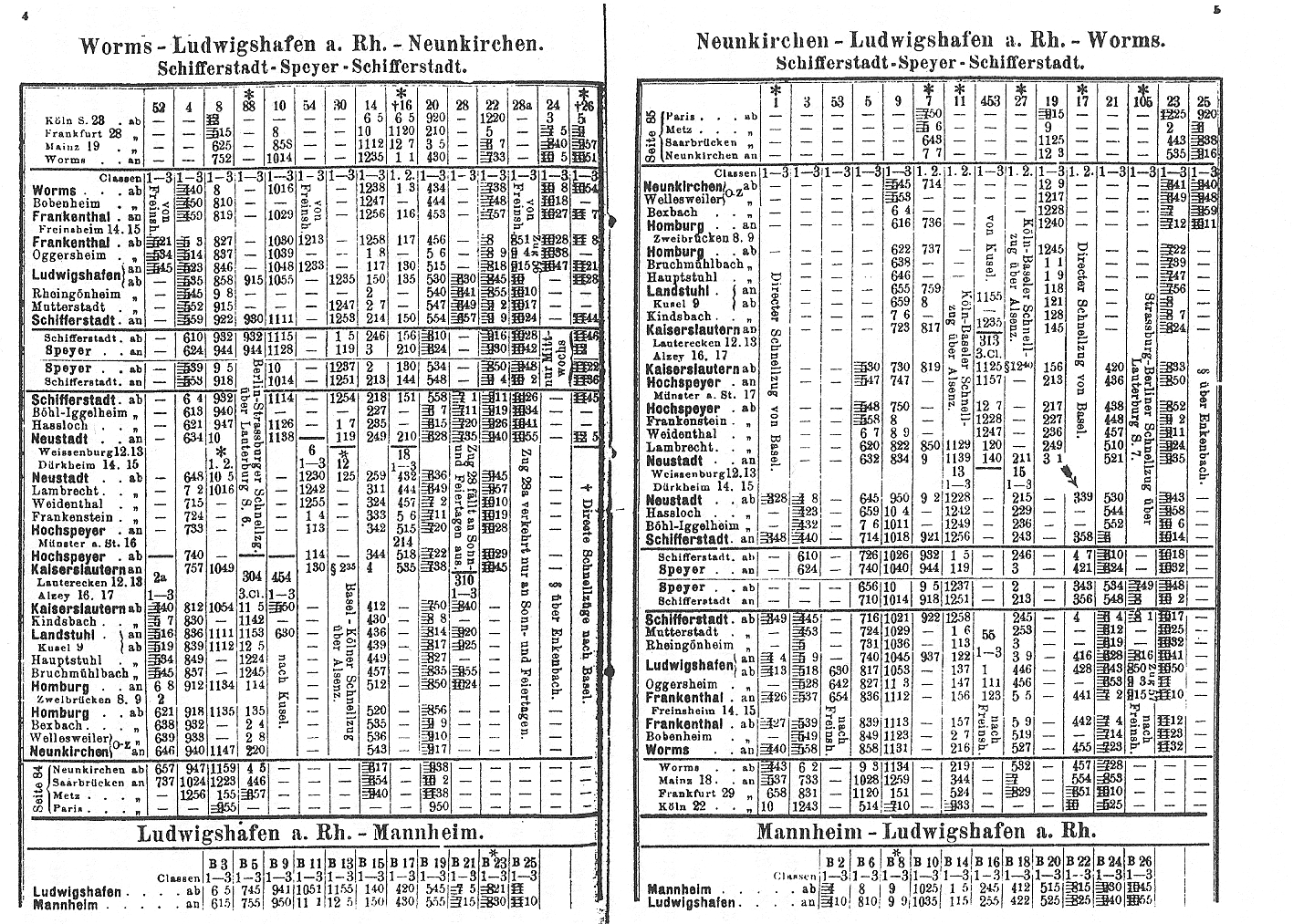
Timetable in 1884

From mid-1872 onwards, some express trains between Cologne and Basel ran over the Neustadt–Hochspeyer section of the line and over the Alsenz Valley Railway, which had been completed the year before. In 1875, an express train operated on the Ludwigshafe–Neustadt–Metz–Paris route. Since the Ludwigshafen–Mannheim section opened in 1867, primarily for freight traffic, there were only shuttle services between the two stations. The opening of the line from St. Ingbert to Saarbrücken via Schwarzenacker and Bierbach in 1879, created a shorter connection to Saarbrücken, which was used by services on the Ludwigshafen–Saarbrücken route. Nevertheless, there were connections to Neunkirchen over the old Ludwig Railway. Most of the express trains were limited to the Mainz–Ludwigshafen–Homburg–Neunkirchen route. In later years, long-distance trains running on the Munich–Oostende route using the Landau–Rohrbach railway, opened in 1875, ran between Saarbrücken and St. Ingbert. In 1884, local services on the Neunkirchen–Worms route ran between Homburg and Ludwigshafen.

==== After the completion of the line ====
After completion of the shortest possible route from Homburg to Saarbrücken via Limbach and Kirkel, the new route was used by through traffic. The number of passenger trains rose significantly. Trains from Neunkirchen only ran as far as Kaiserslautern. Fast trains on the Saarbrücken–St. Ingbert–Rohrbach section ran to Landau and beyond. The railway to Wörth, which branched off in Schifferstadt, including its extension to Strasbourg, was double-track from 1906. Most of the express trains to Strasbourg, which previously ran to Neustadt and, after a reversal, continued over the Maximilian Railway to Alsace, now ran from Schifferstadt via Speyer, Germersheim, Wörth and Lauterburg. Passenger trains on the line to Kusel, which branched from Landstuhl, usually operated from/to Kaiserslautern. During the First World War, the passenger services were significantly reduced due to the prevailing priorities. For example, there was no continuous passenger train from Ludwigshafen to Saarbrücken. Local services were largely restricted to the Homburg–Kaiserslautern and Kaiserslautern–Neustadt sections, with some continuing to Ludwigshafen. Between Homburg and Saarbrücken, regional trains operated both via the route through Limbach and Kirkel that had existed since 1904 and over the older Schwarzenacker–Bierbach route.

In 1920, some trains running between Saarbrücken and Homburg continued over the Glan Valley Railway to Bad Münster am Stein or Kusel. The annexation of the Saar area by Germany in 1935 caused an upsurge in local traffic, since the train trips no longer had to be broken in Homburg.

From the 1930s onwards, trains once again ran on the Berlin–Neunkirchen route in the east–west direction. The outbreak of the Second World War initially had no effect on passenger services. In 1941, an express train ran from Berlin via Paris to Madrid. In 1944, there were services for soldiers on leave using the main line from Mannheim to Saarbrücken on the Stuttgart–Saarbrücken, Frankfurt–Paris, Stuttgart–Calais and Vienna–Metz routes. In the Second World War, with few exceptions, there were no direct local services from Ludwigshafen to Saarbrücken. Shuttle services operated between Kaiserslautern Hauptbahnhof and Einsiedlerhof, to which the Reichsbahn assigned the timetable number of 279d.

==== Post-war period and Deutsche Bundesbahn ====
With the renewed separation of the area now called Saarland, in which the Eichelscheid–Saarbrücken section is found, only a few trains crossed over the border between Bruchmühlbach and Eichelscheid. They served only the workers employed in the Saarland. Regional services between Homburg and Saarbrücken ran both via Limbach and Kirkel and via Schwarzenacker and Bierbach, as in the First World War. At the beginning of the 1950s, a so-called Städteschnellzug ("city express", a supplement-free express train) ran on the Kusel–Heidelberg route between Landstuhl and Mannheim. In 1954, it was downgraded to a semi-fast train (Eilzug). It was discontinued in 1979. The Bundenthaler, which had started in Neustadt before the Second World War, was reactivated in 1951 and now departed from Ludwigshafen and ran to Neustadt, where it reversed and ran to Landau over the Neustadt–Wissembourg railway and then used the Landau–Rohrbach railway to Hinterweidenthal. Between Ludwigshafen and Neustadt, it stopped at all stations. This service ran until 1976. From the end of the 1950s, DB operated an express train service to Paris over the Alsenz Valley Railway east of Kaiserslautern. At the same time, through cars ran through to Rome. A fast train also ran from Heidelberg to Saarbrücken.

At first, there was still no regular interval timetable. The line between Mannheim and Kaiserslautern was used by an express service on the Würzburg–Pirmasens route. Between 1970 and 1975, the line was used by the TEE 50/51 service (Goethe). There was a clear improvement in long-distance services from May 1985 onwards. With the introduction of the Saar-Palatinate regular interval timetable (Saar-Pfalz-Takt) there were hourly operations between Mannheim and Saarbrücken with Intercity (IC), D-Züg and Eilzug services. In 1989, a framework agreement was signed between the Saarland and DB for new local services, including a CityBahn service on the Saarbrücken–Kaiserslautern route with reduced stops and a Citybahn service on the Saarbrücken–Homburg route with stops at all stations. From 1991 onwards the IR 27 InterRegio service ran on the Saarbrücken–Stuttgart route, continuing to Lindau and Bregenz at two-hour intervals. At the same time, there were the first IC services on the Saarbrücken–Dresden route and EuroCity services between Paris and Frankfurt. Both long-haul routes also operated at two-hour intervals. One year later, IC trains replaced all D-Züg services.

==== Deutsche Bahn (since 1994) ====
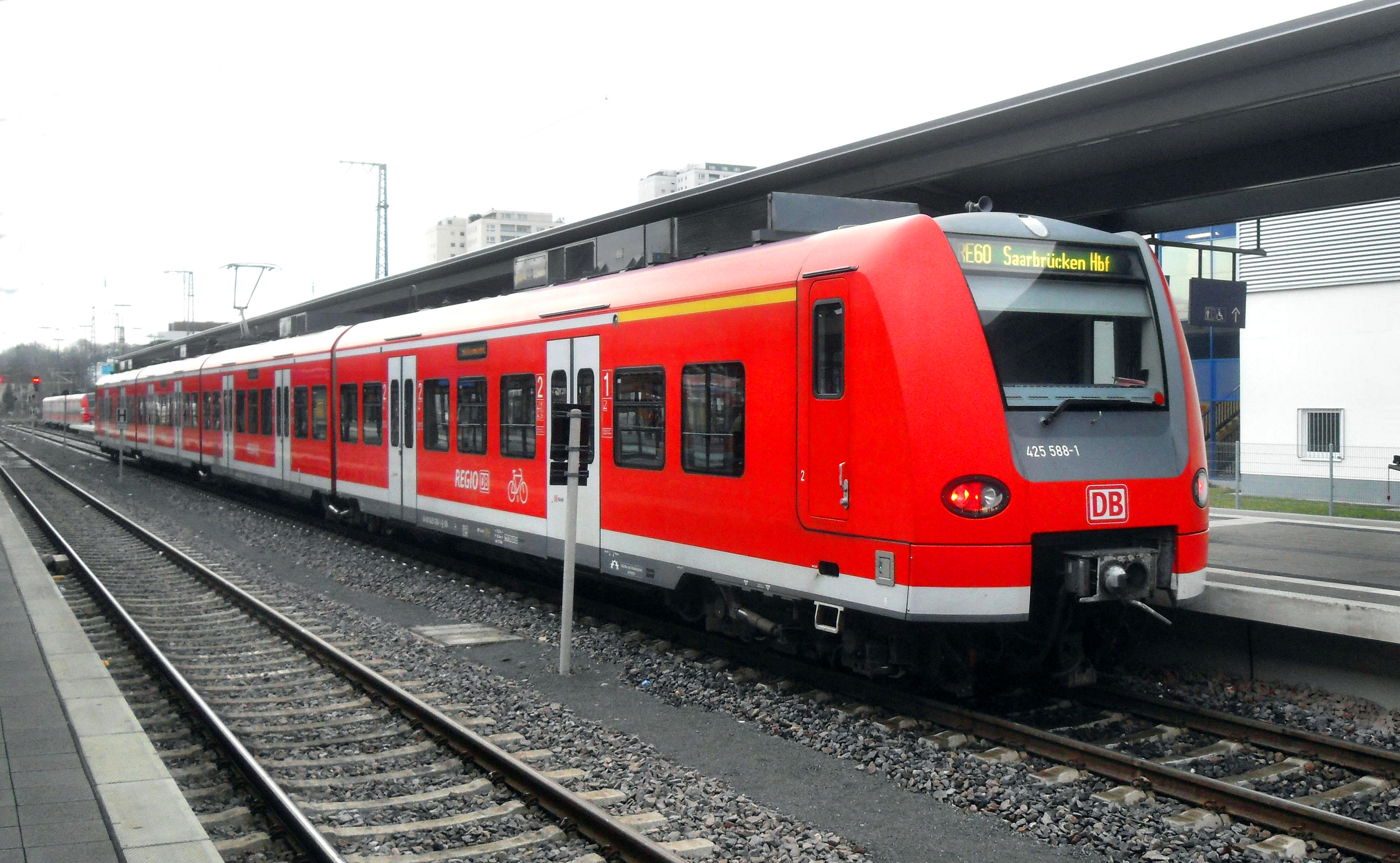
RE service in Kaiserslauter Hauptbahnhof

The Mannheim–Homburg section has been used since the beginning by part of lines S1 (Homburg – Kaiserslautern – Neustadt – Schifferstadt – Ludwigshafen – Mannheim – Heidelberg – Neckargemünd – Eberbach – Mosbach – Osterburken) and S2 (same route, but only from Kaiserslautern and only to Mosbach) of the Rhine-Neckar S-Bahn. Between Mannheim and Kaiserslautern this results in services every half hour. Hourly Regional-Express services run between Kaiserslautern and Saarbrücken and hourly Regionalbahn services run between Homburg and Saarbrücken and over the Saar Railway to Merzig and Trier. Regionalbahn services from Kusel to Kaiserslautern are added in Landstuhl. In the peak hour, two pairs of RE services run on the Mannheim–Saarbrücken route, which stop at the IC stations and in Landstuhl and St. Ingbert.

Regional long-distance and excursion train pairs on Sundays and public holidays from May to October
Name	Section of line used	Starting point	End point
Bundenthaler	Mannheim–Neustadt	Mannheim	Bundenthal-Rumbach
Weinstraßen-Express	Neustadt–Hochspeyer	Koblenz	Wissembourg
Rheintal-Express	Neustadt–Hochspeyer	Karlsruhe	Koblenz
Glantal-Express	Neustadt–Landstuhl	Neustadt	Kusel
Kuckucksbähnel	Neustadt–Lambrecht	Neustadt	Elmstein

As of November 2000, the Intercity-Express services were operated with tilting trains. At the timetable change in May 2001, the hourly service was thinned out by DB and only operated hourly in the main traffic direction during the peak (in the morning to Mannheim, in the evening to Saarbrücken). Some IR services were replaced by RE services. IC services replaced the last IR services from 14 December 2002 and long-distance services were further reduced. An upgrade of the route took place from June 2007 with ICE trains running on the Frankfurt am Main – Paris route. The stops in Neustadt and Homburg dropped. Due to the low traveling speed (only about 100 km/h between Mannheim and Saarbrücken), it is not certain that these high-speed trains will continue to run over this route in the long term. A route via Strasbourg and Karlsruhe will be considered as soon as the TGV line between Metz and Strasbourg is completed.

Currently ICE and Intercity services run on the route from Saarbrücken to Frankfurt, Dresden, Stuttgart and Salzburg, stopping at Homburg, Landstuhl, Kaiserslautern and Neustadt (not all IC and ICE services stop at all the mentioned stations). Since 9 December 2007, ICE 3 services have alternated with TGV services from Frankfurt to Paris, which stop between Mannheim and Saarbrücken only in Kaiserslautern; as a result Neustadt and Homburg has fewer stops by long-distance trains. The route was temporarily the only one within the Palatinate with long-distance services. The ICE trains run on the Frankfurt–Saarbrücken–Paris route; some ICE and IC services run to Frankfurt, Stuttgart and Munich.

=== Freight ===
In the first decades, the Ludwig Railway primarily served as an export route for coal from the Saar basin. Afterwards, the line became a major route for freight traffic between France and Germany. The line from Mannheim to Saarbrücken is one of the busiest freight traffic routes in Germany. Trains carrying combined transport within the European Union are dominated by containers, swap bodies, semi-trailers and other goods at high freight rates. Freight trains run between Mannheim and Homburg, continuing to Neunkirchen or along the whole route of the historic Ludwig Railway. While trains used to transport coal from the Saar basin to the Rhine, the freight flow is now in the opposite direction. There are more than 120 freight trains every day on the line.

The regional freight traffic along the line declined after the Second World War. Already in the 1980s, Übergabegüterzug ("goods exchange train") traffic dominated the operations. Until the early 1990s, the stations between Ludwigshafen and Neustadt, as well as between Landstuhl and Bruchmühlbach-Miesau, were of great importance for the transport of turnips. In 1990, the decline in freight traffic led to the dismantling of the Einsiedlerhof marshalling yard. Other marshalling yards, which were the starting point for Nahgüterzug ("local goods train") traffic, were located in Saarbrücken, Homburg, Neustadt and Ludwigshafen. There are large freight yards in Neustadt an der Weinstrasse, Kaiserslautern (mainly for the Opel plant), Homburg (Saar) and at the terminus in Saarbrücken. In the meantime, all freight sheds have been closed. Along the Ludwigshafen–Schifferstadt section, additional freight trains run from BASF to Speyer or Germersheim. Between Weidenthal and Neidenfels, there is a siding called Glatz II, which supplies the Neidenfels paper factory of the same name. To the east of Neidenfels, there used to be another siding called Glatz I. The Homburg–Saarbrücken section has little freight traffic. Goods exchange trains run to St. Ingbert, which has freight facilities. Isolated freight traffic also run over the line to the Kaiserslautern Military Community.

=== Incidents ===
- On 28 October 1863, a passenger train ran into a moving freight train in Frankenstein. A van packed with 50 workers was attached at its rear. The accident claimed seven lives.
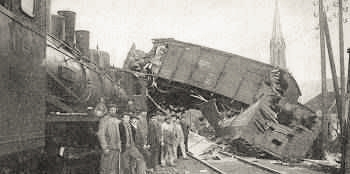
- Rail crash in Weidenthal 1912
  In 1912, a railway accident occurred in Weidenthal. One person died and there were several injured.
- Near Homburg (Saar), the D 32 derailed during an air raid on 9 February 1917.
- Near Bruchmühlbach, a holiday train ran into a freight train in dense snow on 7 January 1918. The data on the number of victims vary. Some sources give 33 deaths and 121 injuries, others 12 deaths and 87 injuries.
- In 1968, shortly before midnight, the Frankfurt – Paris express ran into the connecting track to the Miesau Army Depot (US Army) in Hauptstuhl because of wrongly set points. It derailed there due to its speed being too high for the siding. One person was killed and four injured.
- On 28 June 1988, a railway accident occurred in the Heiligenberg Tunnel. One passenger was killed on the D 2754 express (Heidelberg – Saarbrücken). 10 people had major and 28 had minor injuries. After a violent storm, part of the retaining wall east of the Heiligenberg Tunnel fell onto the tracks towards Mannheim. A freight train loaded with bulk goods from Saarbrücken ran into the rubble and partly derailed; the locomotive and three wagons were forced onto the track. The express train immediately ran straight into the damaged vehicles.
- On 17 August 2010 near Lambrecht in the Palatinate, set 4681 as ICE 9556 Frankfurt/Main–Paris bounced off a garbage truck which had just fallen onto the track. Two cars of the ICE derailed and sustained damage with the leading car was cut open along its whole length. Of the 320 passengers, 15 were injured; the driver of the garbage truck had been able to escape the full impact on his vehicle, despite serious injuries. As a result of the accident, major disturbances to operations and diversions of long-distance passenger services and freight operations occurred.

== Rolling stock ==
=== Steam locomotives ===
The respective railway administrators always operated powerful locomotives on this line. In the early days, the workshops, later locomotive depots (Bahnbetriebswerke), were located in Kaiserslautern, Ludwigshafen and Neustadt.

Others were located in Homburg, Mannheim and Saarbrücken. In the first years after the opening of the former Ludwig Railway, locomotives of the Maschinenfabrik Emil Keßler and Maffei were acquired, respectively numbered Palatine No. 1 to 8 and 21 and Palatine No. 9 to 20. They bore names like Haardt, Vogesus, Denis and Alwens. Crampton locomotives with the numbers Palatine No. 26 to 63 were acquired in the 1850s. Locomotives of classes Palatine G 1.I and Palatine G 2.II, among others, were acquired for freight operations. Palatine T 1 locomotives were used for local and freight operations.

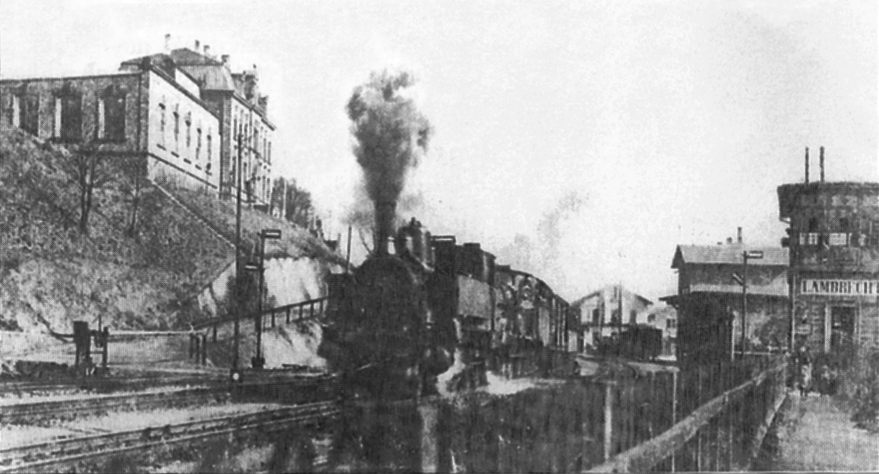
Steam locomotives of P 2.II and P 3.1 classes passing through Lambrecht

At the beginning of the 20th century, locomotives of classes P 2.I, P 2.II, P 3, P 4 and P 5 were used to haul long-distance trains, some of them also local trains. Local traffic was especially hauled by locomotives of P 1.I, P 1.II, P 1.III and T 1 classes. Freight traffic was hauled by G 2.I, G 2.II, G 4.I, G 4.II and G 5 class locomotives. Class T 3 locomotives hauled traffic between Mannheim and Ludwigshafen.

In the Deutsche Reichsbahn period, the steam depots of the old Palatine Railway continued to be used. Locomotives of classes 01, 03, 44 and 64 were added. In addition, locomotives of classes 58.0, 75.0 and 75.4 were operated. These steam locomotives operated between Mannheim and Saarbrücken after the Second World War. In the 1950s, class 01 locomotives hauled fast trains from Trier and class 03 locomotives hauled fast trains from Ludwigshafen and Kaiserslautern. Operations of local traffic was dominated by locomotives of classes 23, 38, 71 and 78 and the operations of goods traffic were hauled by class 44 and 50 locomotives. Among others, classes 93.5-12 and 94.5 were used for shunting.

=== Electric rolling stock ===
Following the electrification of the line, which resulted in the closure of the locomotive depots in Neustadt and Homburg, DB's new locomotive classes were used. For decades, freight operations, were dominated by class E 40 locomotives, local traffic by electric locomotives of class E 41 hauling the then new Silberling coaches. Express trains were mostly hauled by locomotives of class E 10/110. The two-system prototypes of class E 310/181.0 were based in the Saarbrücken locomotive depot from 1966, mostly for hauling express trains to France. Class 103 locomotives were used from 1971 onwards.

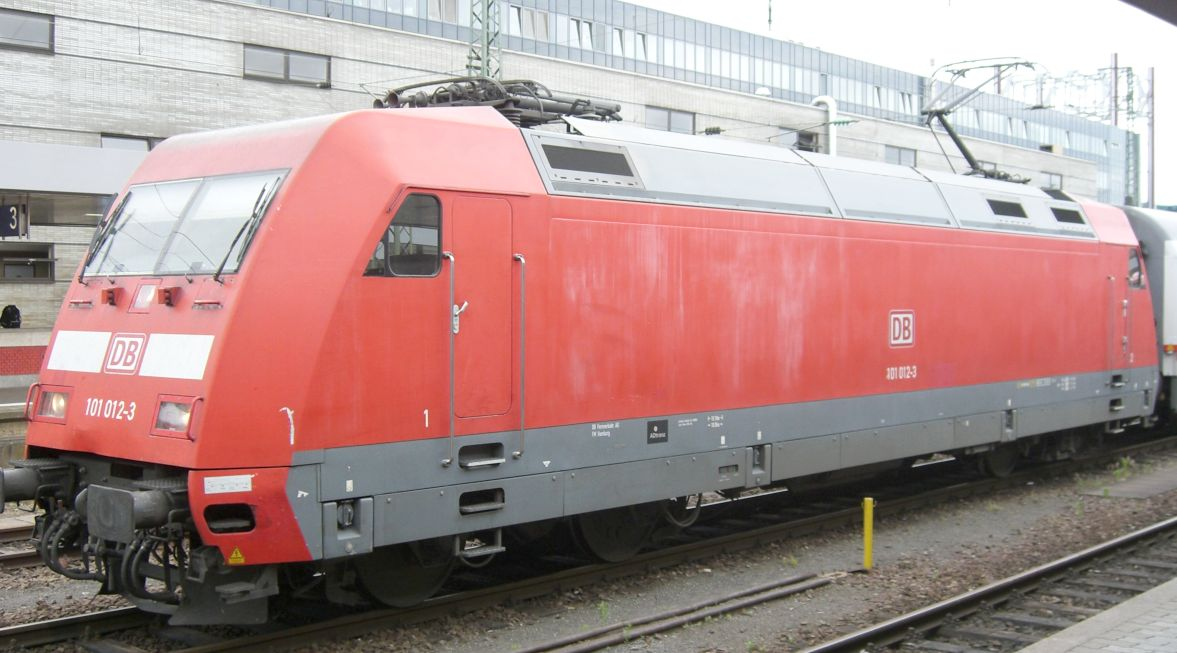
Class 101 electric locomotives hauling an IC train in Saarbrücken Hauptbahnhof

With the commissioning of the two-system locomotives of class 181.2 from 1974, they hauled almost all the expresses and semi-fast trains between Metz, Saarbrücken, Mannheim, Frankfurt and Heidelberg. They lost their importance after the introduction of ICE operations on the Frankfurt–Saarbrücken–Paris route. Class 101 locomotives and some Austrian locomotives of class 1016/1116 haul the IC traffic, the domestic ICE traffic is operated with tilting trains of class 411/415 and international services are operated with multi-system ICE sets of class 406. French TGV trains are often used as a substitute for ICEs between Mannheim and Saarbrücken. Sets of classes 425 and 426 are used in local and regional operations.

In freight operations, DB Cargo prefers to use dual-system technology with electric locomotives of class 185. These now haul freight trains from Mannheim to Metz, some to the gates of Lyon and Paris. The former stops in Saarbrücken marshalling yard and Forbach have been omitted. SBB generally operates class Re 4/4 locomotives in freight transport on this route, mainly along with class Re 482 locomotives. Locomotives of classes E 40, 155 and Siemens ES64F are used for freight traffic to the Opel factory in Kaiserslautern and operate traffic to Saarbrücken, Homburg, Einsiedlerhof, Neustadt and Mannheim.

=== Other rolling stock ===
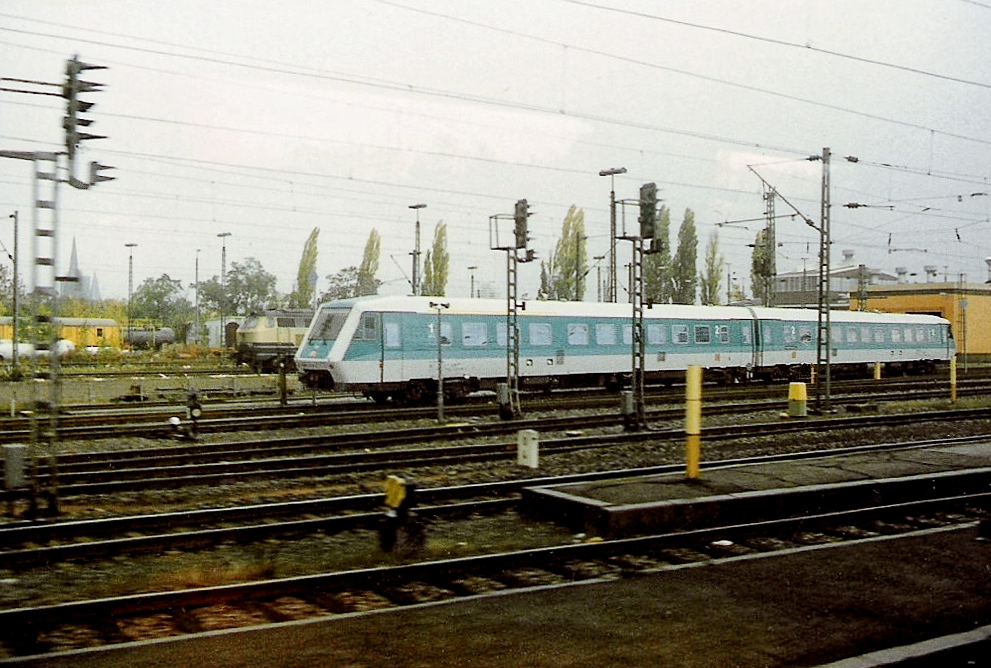
Diesel multiple unit of class 611 in Kaiserslautern

From 1897, accumulator railcars of classes MC and MBCC were operated between Ludwigshafen and Neustadt. Wittfeld accumulator railcars, which were stationed in Kaiserslautern, operated from 1926 to about 1952, mainly between Kaiserslautern and Landstuhl.

High-speed trains diesel-hydraulic multiple units of classes VT 08 and VT 12.5 were operated in the 1950s and 1960s. Class 515 accumulator railcars occasionally operated on the line from 1956 to 1989. Class VT 24 diesel multiple units operated some local services from 1964 to 1980. Class 628 DMUs operated school transport around noon from the 1980s onwards. Class 220 diesel-hydraulic locomotives hauled services between the Neustadt and Hochspeyer from 1967 to 1973. Some of the freight trains, which in the past ran between Ludwigshafen and Schifferstadt and between Neustadt and Hochspeyer were hauled by class 212 and 218 diesel locomotives. Diesel locomotives of classes V 60 and V 90 are used for the operation of the sidings that are not electrified. A private works locomotive is used for the shunting in Neidelfels. In St. Ingbert, a private company operates a diesel locomotive imported from the Czech Republic.

== Route ==
=== Geography of the line ===
==== Mannheim – Neustadt ====
The line starts at Mannheim Hauptbahnhof and runs for several kilometres as four tracks. At the Hauptbahnhof it runs past Mannheim Palace, where it branches off from the western approach to the Riedbahn, then rounds a sharp curve to the Rhine and thus the state border between Baden-Württemberg and Rhineland-Palatinate. In Walzmühle, it passes Ludwigshafen (Rhein) Mitte station, which has existed since 2003, and then reaches Ludwigshafen Hauptbahnhof, where the line from Mainz connects from the north. After crossing Ludwigshafen, the line turns to the southwest and runs straight to Schifferstadt.

The bypass of Schifferstadt, opened in 2003, branches off in Limburgerhof and runs parallel to the local tracks. South of Limburgerhof, however, it cuts the curve past Schifferstadt. After Schifferstadt station, where the line to Wörth branches off to the left, the line turns westwards. Shortly before Böhl-Iggelheim station, the new line reconnects with the old line. The latter runs over a long straight to just before Neustadt (Weinstr) Böbig station. There the Palatine Northern Railway (Pfälzische Nordbahn) connects from Monsheim and, before Neustadt Hauptbahnhof, it is joined by the Maximilian Railway, which comes from Wissembourg to the south. After Neustadt the line runs into the Palatine Forest (Pfälzerwald) and thus leaves the Upper Rhine Plain (Oberrheinische Tiefebene).

==== Neustadt – Kaiserslautern ====
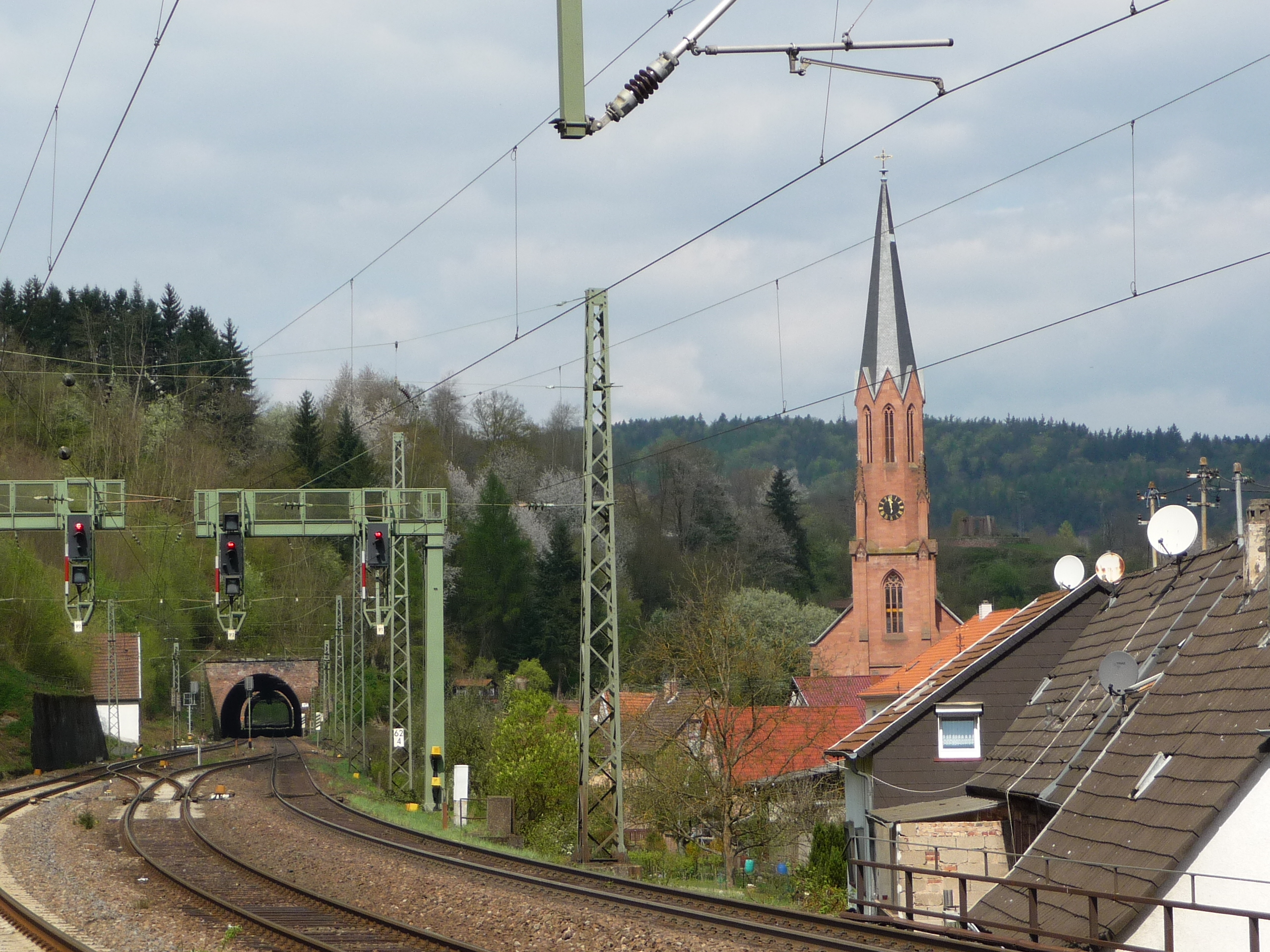
Course of the line in Weidenthal with the Gipp Tunnel in the background

Within the Palatine Forest, the number of curves along the line increases significantly. The line runs parallel to the federal highway 39 through the middle range, which it repeatedly crosses on bridges in this region. On the 33.5 kilometre-long section between Neustadt an der Weinstraße and Kaiserslautern, the line climbs through a height difference of 109 metres and passes through a total of twelve tunnels. Along this section, the line passes next to several sandstone cliffs. West of Neustadt, the line passes through the Wolfsberg Tunnel. The line runs along the Speyerbach to Lambrecht, where the Little Cuckoo Railway (Kuckucksbähnel), operated as a heritage railway since 1984, branches off.

West of Lambrecht, the line follows the valley of the Hochspeyerbach through several gorges, the meanders of which have been shortened by several tunnels: Lichtensteiner-Kopf, Retschbach, Schönberg-Langeck, Mainzer Berg, Gipp, Köpfle, Eisenkehl and Kehre. In this area, the railway runs over several bridges over the river or federal highway 39. At Neidenfels it passes Neidenfels Castle (Burg Neidenfels) and Lichtenstein Castle (Burg Lichtenstein). The Neidenfels crossover remains as a remnant of a construction site. Schlossberg Tunnel under Frankenstein Castle ends shortly before Frankenstein. West of Frankenstein, the line changes direction from northwest to west and the valley is wider in this area. The Franzosenwoog Tunnel is located there. Between Frankenstein and Hochspeyer, the Alsenz Valley Railway branches off to the north. Federal highway 48 crosses the line on a bridge to the west of Hochspeyer station and, a few kilometres later, the line crosses the watershed between the Speyerbach and the Lauter, often seen as part of the Palatine Watershed, in the Heiligenberg Tunnel, the longest railway tunnel in the Palatinate. The line from Enkenbach joins shortly before Kaiserslautern Hauptbahnhof.

==== Kaiserslautern – Saarbrücken ====
Immediately west of Kaiserslautern the Lauter Valley Railway branches to the north and the Biebermühl Railway to the south. The line is straight in this area and passes the Einsiedlerhof marshalling yard. There it leaves the Palatinate Forest and runs through the Westpfälzische Moorniederung (West Palatine lowland swamp) and Landstuhl. Shortly before Hauptstuhl, it runs through a wet meadow (Nasswiese), which is a protected environment. Autobahn 6 runs parallel and north of the line. After passing through Bruchmühlbach-Miesau station as well as the now dismantled Vogelbach crossover, it crosses the border between Rhineland-Palatinate and the Saarland.

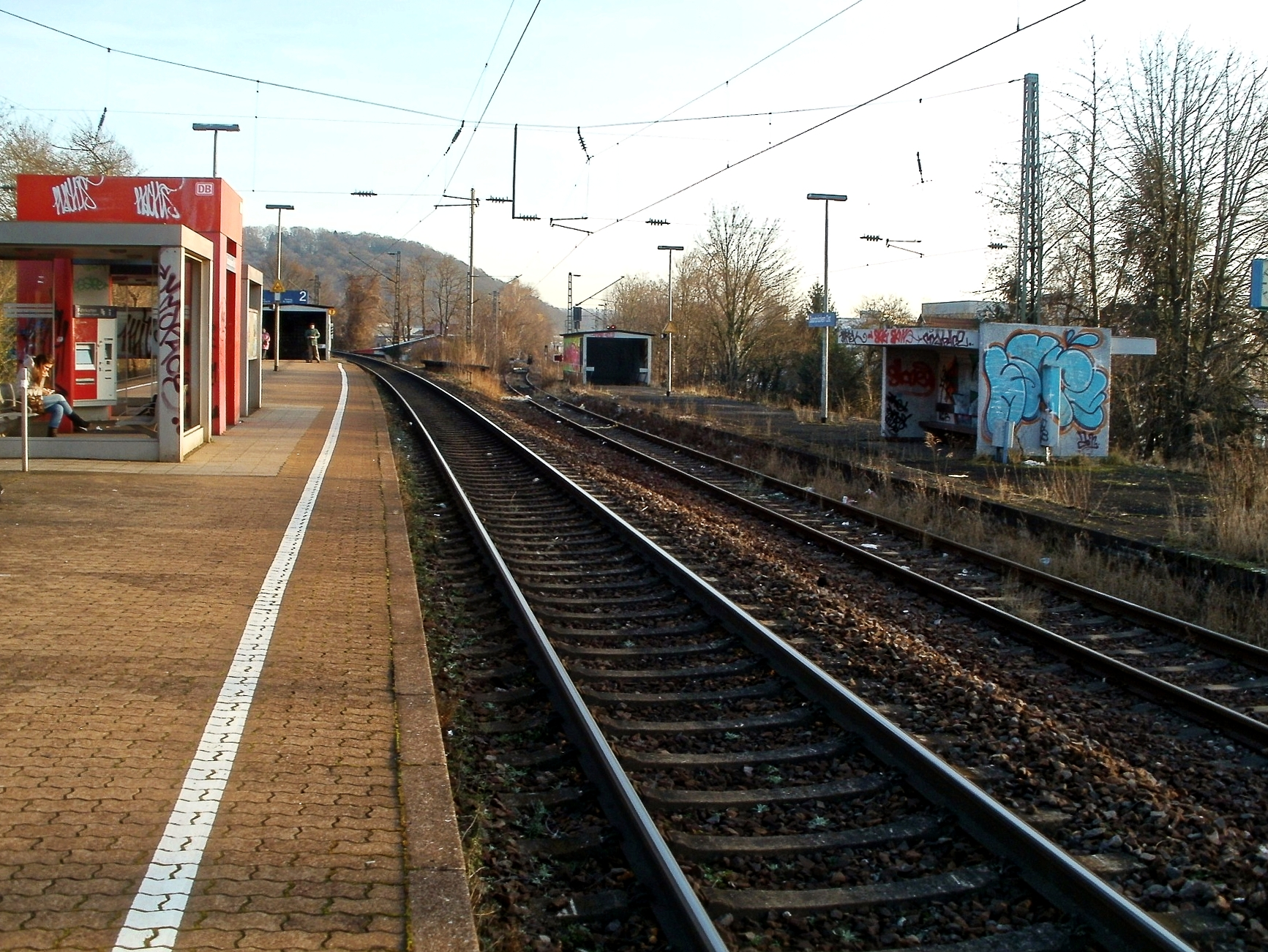
Saarbrücken Ost station

To the west of the former Eichelscheid station, which is now unoccupied, was the temporary Bruchhof crossover, which was also built for a construction project. After Homburg, the Mannheim–Saarbrücken railway separates from the historic Palatine Ludwig Railway (Pfälzische Ludwigsbahn), which turns right and continues through Bexbach to Neunkirchen. The Homburg–Zweibrücken railway, which has now been closed, branched off to the south. The line continues to Saarbrücken past the disused Homburg (Saar) West customs station and crosses the Blies. In this area it runs along the northern edge of the Sankt Ingbert-Kirkeler Waldgebiet (forest area). It then runs through Limbach and Kirkel to Rohrbach station. In Rohrbach, it meets the line from Landau, which comes from the southeast; shortly earlier the railway crosses the autobahn, which then continues parallel to the south. The railway passes through the towns of St. Ingbert, Rentrisch and Scheidt, which are located in the densely populated valley along the Rohrbach, which it crosses three times. At Halberg, it connects with the Saarbrücken–Sarreguemines railway and reaches its terminus at Saarbrücken Hauptbahnhof.

==== Height profile ====
The line falls to the last set of points at Saarbrücken Hauptbahnhof (208 m a.s.l.) shortly after the part of the station that is designated as "So" to Saarbrücken Ost station at a grade of 0.65%, reaching its steepest gradient in the last third of the platform area at 1.09%. The section to Scheidt (Saar) runs almost level, but from the eastern end of St. Ingbert station it rises more steeply with a maximum climb of 1.05% until it reaches its first crest of about 272 m a.s.l. in a deep cutting between Rohrbach (Saar) and Kirkel (both at ca. 258 m a.s.l.). Its subsequent gradient is up to 1.05% shortly before Limbach (b. Homburg/Saar) (233 m a.s.l.), where it is level. It then climbs at up to 0.85% to Homburg (Saar) Hauptbahnhof (243 m a.s.l.). The height profile between Homburg (Saar) and Kaiserslautern is characterised by a slight fall to Bruchmühlbach-Miesau (235 m a.s.l.), a slight climb up to Hauptstuhl, a slight rise to Kindsbach (247 m a.s.l.) and a largely level route to Kaiserslautern Hauptbahnhof (250 m a.s.l.).

Between Kaiserslautern and the second crest of ca. 278 m a.s.l., which is located shortly after Heiligenberg Tunnel and is also the highest point of the line, there is a maximum climb of 0.43%. Following a short level section, the longest down grade begins. Between the second crest and Neustadt (Weinstraße) Hauptbahnhof (142 m a.s.l.) there are grades of up to 0.8% in the Palatine Forest. On the Neustadt (Weinstr)–Mannheim section there is a slightly falling gradient overall. The long-distance railway on the Schifferstädter bypass climbs at a maximum gradient on the newly built section of 0.8% and then falls at first at over 0.7% and then runs almost level parallel with the S-Bahn (Schifferstadt lies at 103 m a.s.l.). A sharp rise in Ludwigshafen (Rhein) Hauptbahnhof (94 m a.s.l.) is followed by the ramp up to the Rhine Bridge to Mannheim Hauptbahnhof, which involves a climb of about seven metres with a gradient of between 2.0% and 0.25%.

=== Chainage ===
Due to the fact that the Mannheim–Saarbrücken railway is a conglomerate of several railway sections, it does not have a single sequence of marked kilometre points (chainage). This can be seen in Homburg Hauptbahnhof, where there is a jump from 31.1 to 8.3. The zero point of the chainage from Homburg is located on the former national border between Bavaria and Prussia to the west of Bexbach on the Homburg–Neunkirchen railway.

=== Maximum speeds ===
==== Saarbrücken – Kaiserslautern ====
In Saarbrücken Hauptbahnhof, the speed is generally limited to 60 km/h. In the following Saarbrücken–Schafbrücke and Rentrisch–St. Ingbert sections the maximum permissible speed is 90 km/h. Between Schafbrücke and Rentrisch it is 100 km/h and from Scheidt (Saar) it is 110 km/h. Shortly after St. Ingbert station the maximum permissible speed is gradually increased to 120 km/h, 140 km/h and 160 km/h. The maximum permissible speed shortly after Limbach is 150 km/h, but, due to a narrow curve radius before Homburg (Saar) Hauptbahnhof, it is reduced to 110 km/h (120 km/h in the opposite direction). After this curve, the maximum allowed speed is restored to 160 km/h but in Einsiedlerhof marshalling yard it is reduced to 140 km/h again. From the entrance signal to Kaiserslautern Hauptbahnhof it is reduced to 100 km/h (90 km/h in the opposite direction) but the maximum speed is returned at the next curve to 140 km/h and raised to 150 km/h outside the station.

==== Kaiserslautern – Mannheim ====
The Kaiserslautern–Hochspeyer section is passable from the end of Heiligenberg Tunnel at up to 150 km/h. The maximum speed is then reduced to 130 km/h and then 100 km/h. The section between Hochspeyer and Neustadt is largely passable at 90–100 km/h, with the exception of a section near Frankenstein (Pfalz) that has a maximum speed of 80 km/h.

In Neustadt Hauptbahnhof, the maximum permissible speed of 100 km/h (90 km/h in the opposite direction) is raised via 130 km/h to 140 km/h and after a subsequent right curve is restored to 160 km/h. This maximum speed continues to Ludwigshafen-Mundenheim, where the top speed is reduced from 130 km/h to 80 km/h and then 60 km/h. On the Ludwigshafen–Mannheim section, the selected path determines the permissible maximum speed. 20, 30, 40, 60, 70 or 80 km/h might be permitted. The signalling basically consists of the speed indicators of the signals.

=== Signalling and safety systems ===
Due to the modernisation of numerous interlockings with electronic interlockings from the end of the 1990s and the subsequent upgrade of the line, the majority of semaphore signals and H/V signals (Haupt-/Vorsignal—main/distant signal; a system of signalling introduced in 1924 as semaphores, but now mainly consisting of colour-light signals) have disappeared. The Saarbrücken–Kaiserslautern and Hochspeyer–Ludwigshafen sections are almost completely equipped with new Ks signals (Kombinationssignal—combination signals). Exceptions to this are, in addition to the Kaiserslautern–Hochspeyer and Ludwigshafen–Mannheim sections, Landstuhl and Schifferstadt stations. These still use H/V signals in standard and compact forms.

The Ks signals is controlled from the Karlsruhe signalling control centre through the four subcentres of Saarbrücken, Homburg, Einsiedlerhof and Neustadt. The exceptions are the stations of Landstuhl and Hochspeyer, which are connected to the subcentres of Einsiedlerhof or Neustadt via a matching system. Apart from the Ludwigshafen–Mannheim section, the only stations that are still locally controlled are Kaiserslautern Hauptbahnhof and Schifferstadt.

Landstuhl station, which is currently under reconstruction, is to receive electronic signalling by 2019. In this case, the existing signals are to be replaced by Ks signals. No replacement of the rest of the push-button relay interlocking-controlled signals by electronic interlockings is currently scheduled.

The whole route is equipped with the Punktförmige Zugbeeinflussung intermittent cab signalling system and the Saarbrücken–Kaiserslautern section is also equipped with the ZUB 262 (Geschwindigkeitsüberwachung Neigetechnik—speed control for tilting technology) system and the Kaiserslautern–Neustadt section is equipped with the ZUB 122 system (an older speed control system for tilting technology).

== Operating points ==
=== Mannheim Hauptbahnhof ===
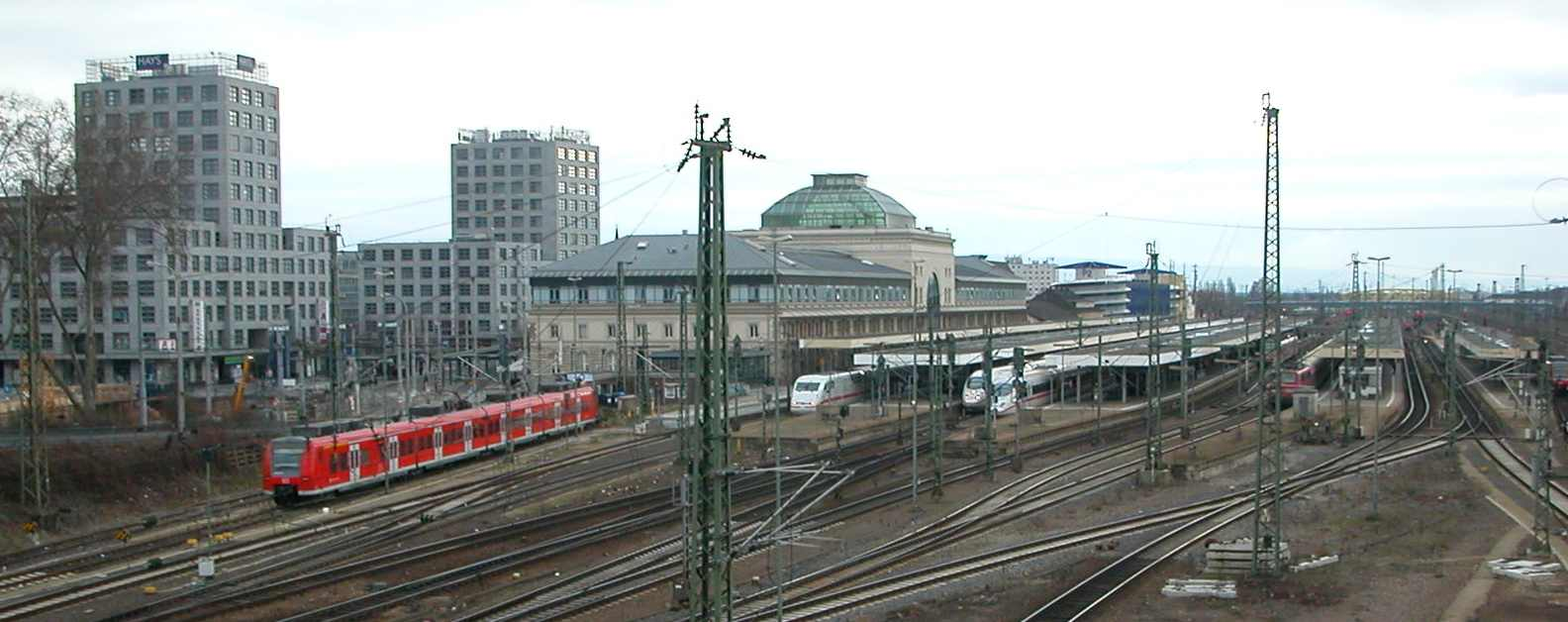
Mannheim Hauptbahnhof

Mannheim Hauptbahnhof (main station), located in the western part of the city of Mannheim is the only station on the line in Baden-Württemberg. It was built in 1876, nine years after the connecting line was built to Ludwigshafen. It replaced the original terminus at the Tattersall tram stop. Other railway lines connecting to the station are the Rhine Valley Railway to Basel, the Rhine Railway to Rastatt, the Riedbahn to Frankfurt along with its western approach opened in 1985, and the Mannheim–Stuttgart high-speed railway. The entrance building was renovated in 2001.

=== Ludwigshafen (Rhein) Mitte ===
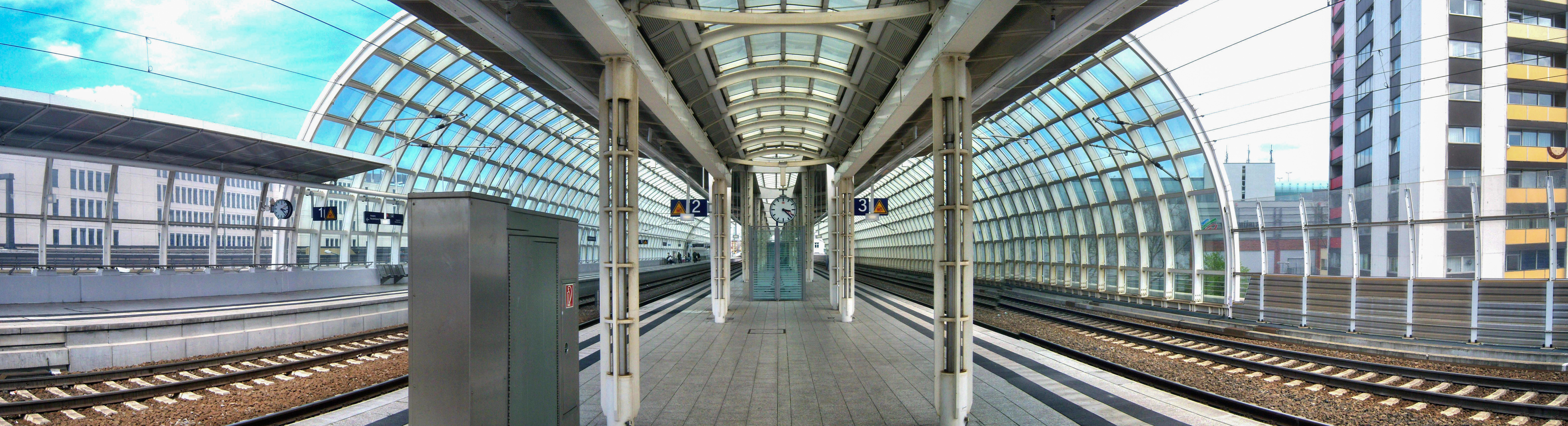
Ludwigshafen (Rhein) Mitte station

The Haltepunkt ("halt point", which essentially indicates that it has no set of points) of Ludwigshafen (Rhein) Mitte (middle) was built by DB for the opening of the Rhine-Neckar S-Bahn. It is located immediately west of the Konrad Adenauer Bridge and near Berliner Platz. Its purpose is to compensate for the absence of a central station since 1969. It has four tracks and a futuristic platform roof.

=== Ludwigshafen (Rhein) Hauptbahnhof ===
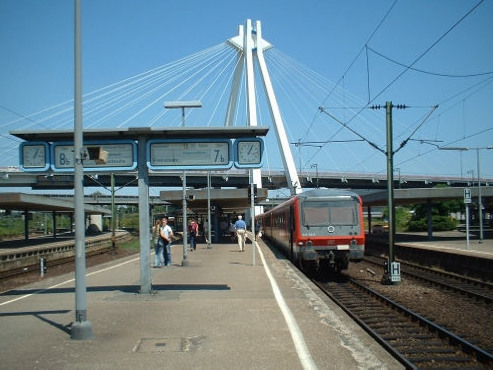
Ludwigshafen (Rhein) Hauptbahnhof

At the time of the opening of the Ludwig Railway the then Ludwigshafen station was a terminus in the town centre not far from the Rhine. There, the coal, for which the line was built in the first place, was transferred to ships for onward transport. With the opening of the line to Mainz in 1853 and the connection to Mannheim 1867, it became a railway junction. Later it was given the designation of Ludwigshafen (Rhein) Hauptbahnhof in response to the integration of surrounding localities that had also received railway connections. The fact that it was a terminal station increasingly proved to be a handicap. For this reason, there were already plans to move it to another location as early as the beginning of the 20th century.

The construction work began in 1962 and the station has been in its present form since 1969. Since then, it has been a junction station. The demolition of the tracks and the railway buildings at the old terminus were completed in 1971. However, as a result of the relocation, the station lost its importance. Because of its short distance to Mannheim Hauptbahnhof, most trains pass through without stopping. It lost further significance with the commissioning of the Ludwigshafen (Rhein) Mitte station and since then most Regional-Express services also no longer stop at Ludwigshafen Hauptbahnhof, while they all stop at Mitte station.

=== Ludwigshafen-Mundenheim ===
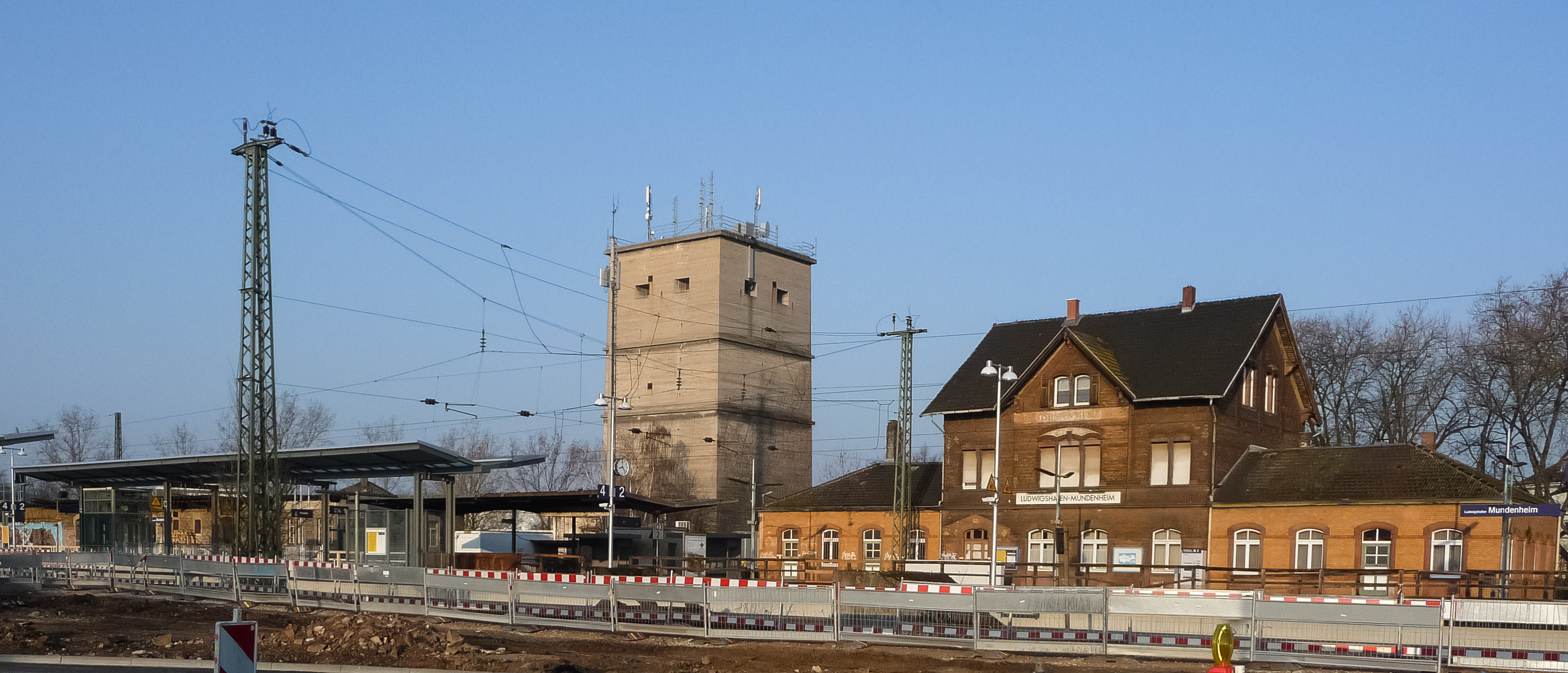
Ludwigshafen-Mundenheim station

Ludwigshafen-Mundenheim station Is located in the south-west of the Ludwigshafen district of Mundenheim. It originated in 1886 and was originally just called Mundenheim. From 1890, a narrow-gauge railway ran to Dannstadt and was extended in 1911 to Meckenheim. It received a new entrance building in connection with the quadruplication of the main railway between Schifferstadt and Ludwigshafen. Due to the incorporation of Mundenheim into Ludwigshafen, it was renamed Ludwigshafen-Mundenheim. The closure of the narrow-gauge railway to Meckenheim followed in 1955. Since the commissioning of the new Ludwigshafen Hauptbahnhof in 1969, the station has been administered as a part of that station. From it branches off a stretch of freight line that winds to the Rhine and connects to the BASF plant.

=== Ludwigshafen-Rheingönheim ===
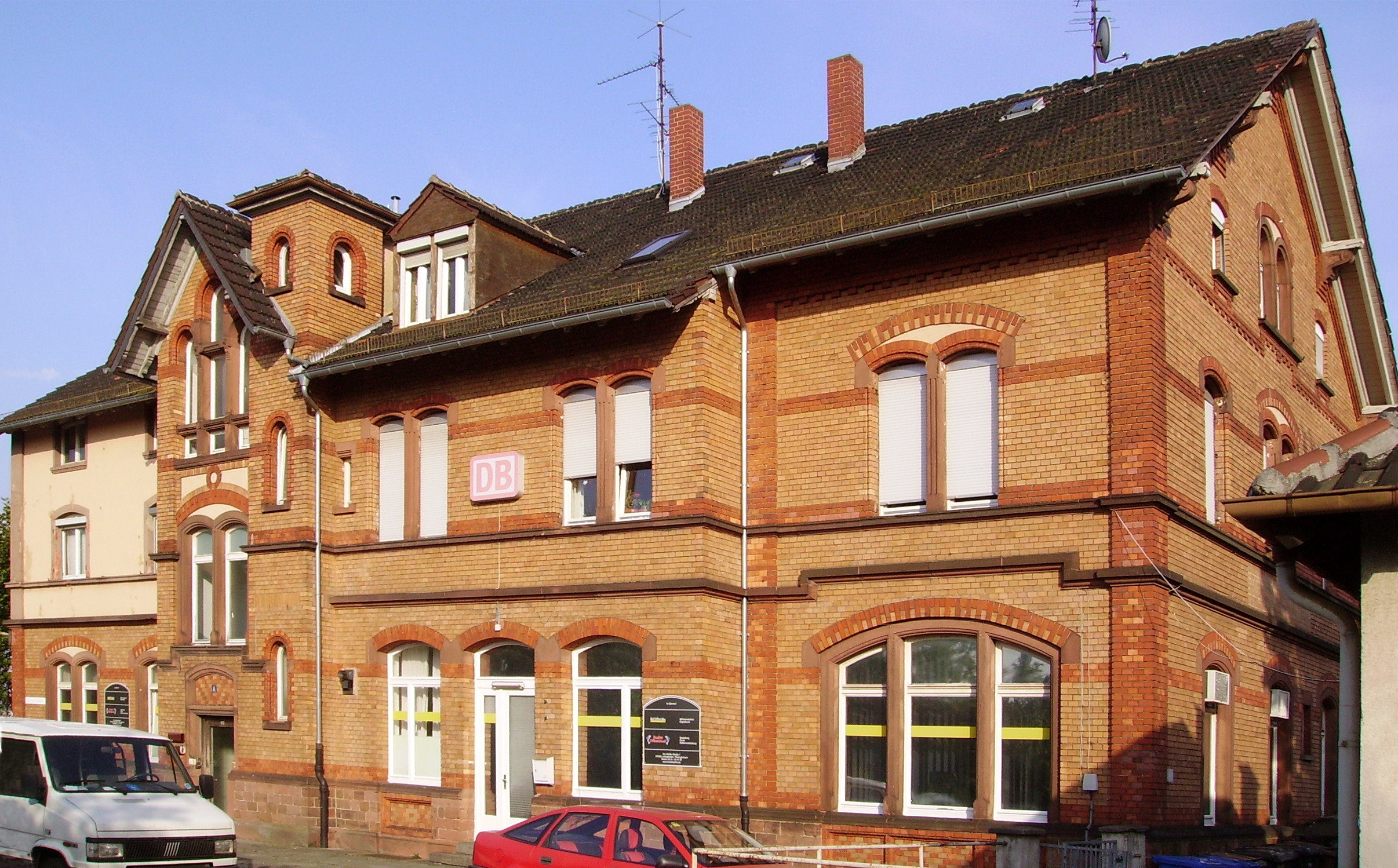
Ludwigshafen-Rheingönheim station

Ludwigshafen-Rheingönheim station lies in the west of the Ludwigshafen district of Rheingönheim and was built around 1870. Originally it was called Rheingönheim. It received a new entrance building in connection with the quadruplication of the main railway between Schifferstadt and Ludwigshafen. Deutsche Reichsbahn renamed it Ludwigshafen-Rheingönheim after the incorporation of the town into Ludwigshafen on 15 May 1939. Since the commissioning of the new Ludwigshafen Hauptbahnhof in 1969, the station has administered as a part of that station. The handling of freight at the station was at one time carried out with the help of an MB-Trac, which also had wheels for running on rail tracks. A siding opened at the end of 2010 connects to the premises of a local company. This was the first new connection to be built for decades to the Mannheim–Saarbrücken line.

=== Limburgerhof ===
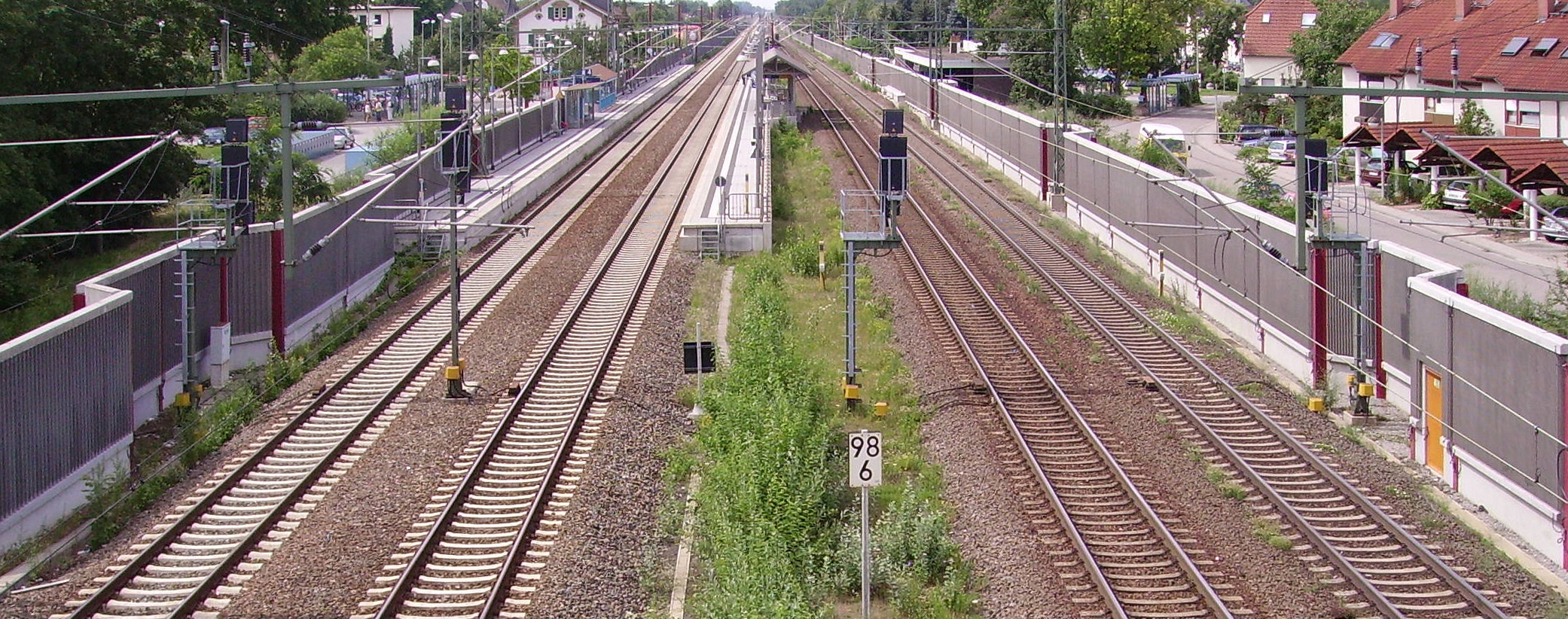
Limburgerhof station

The former Bahnhof (station) and current Haltepunkt (halt) of Limburgerhof is located in the middle of the residential area of Limburgerhof. It was originally called Mutterstadt, but that community lies a few kilometres to the west. Since Mutterstadt received a connection to the narrow gauge Ludwigshafen–Dannstadt railway from 1890, it was unofficially often referred to as Mutterstadt Hauptbahnhof. With the quadruplication of the main line, it received a new entrance building for passenger traffic on the western side of the railway tracks, while its heritage-listed predecessor was now exclusively used for freight traffic. The entrance building was demolished during the electrification of the line and replaced by a new building. The station got its present name around 1930, when the settlement of Limburgerhof, which had been created in its immediate vicinity, became an independent municipality.

=== Schifferstadt ===
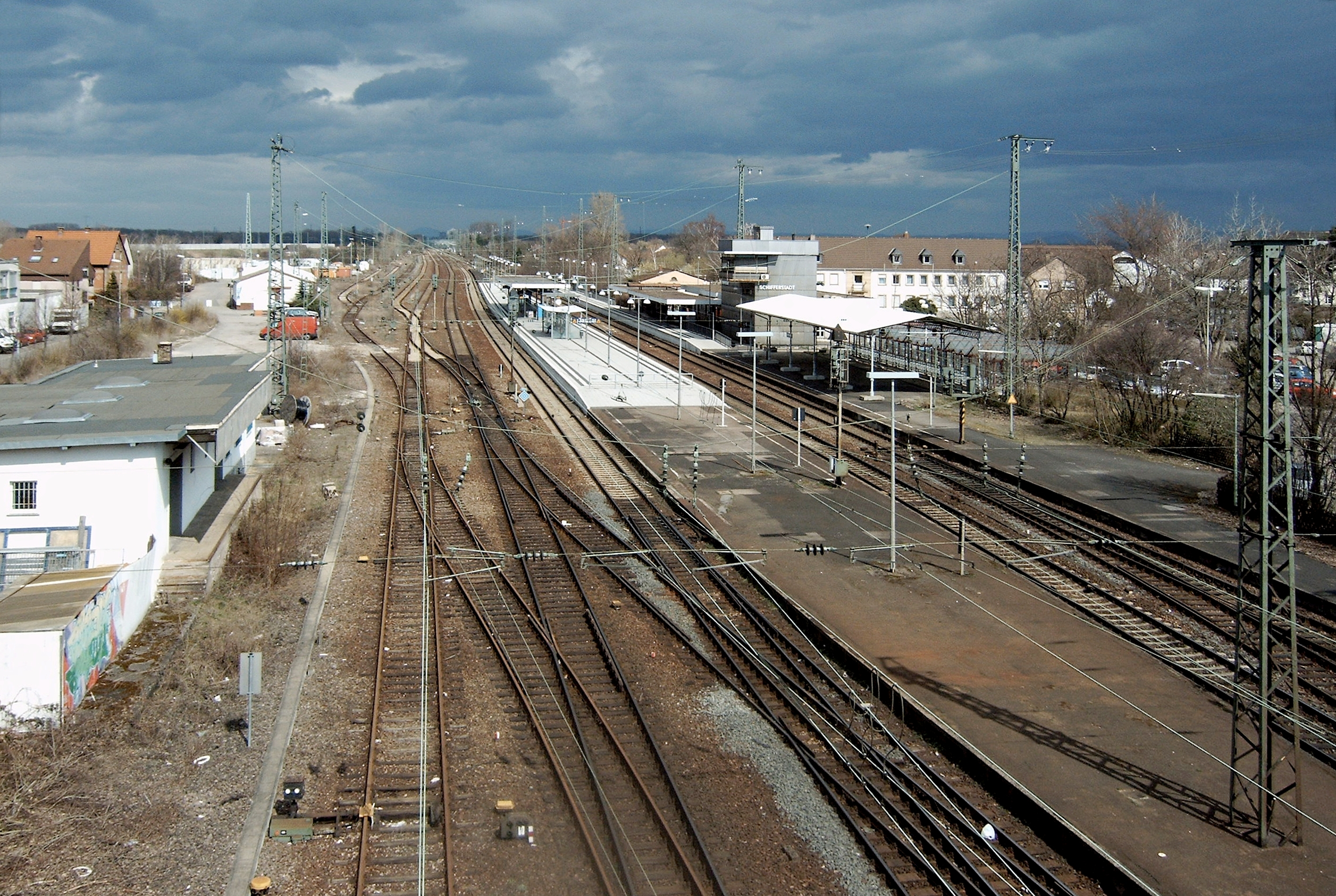
Schifferstadt station

Schifferstadt station is located on the northwestern outskirts of Schifferstadt and it is classified as a category 3 station. It was opened on 11 June 1847 as part of the Ludwigshafen–Neustadt section of the Ludwig Railway. At the same time the branch line to Speyer was opened. Schifferstadt became the first railway junction within the Palatinate. The branch line to Speyer was extended to Germersheim in 1864 and to Wörth in 1876. The station's track layout had to be rebuilt during the duplication of that line at the beginning of the 20th century. The station gained a locomotive depot, which was administered as part of the Neustadt locomotive depot (Bahnbetriebswerk). The original entrance building was demolished in 1964 and replaced by a new one. Parts of the platform canopy from the original station building are protected as a historical monument.

=== Böhl-Iggelheim ===
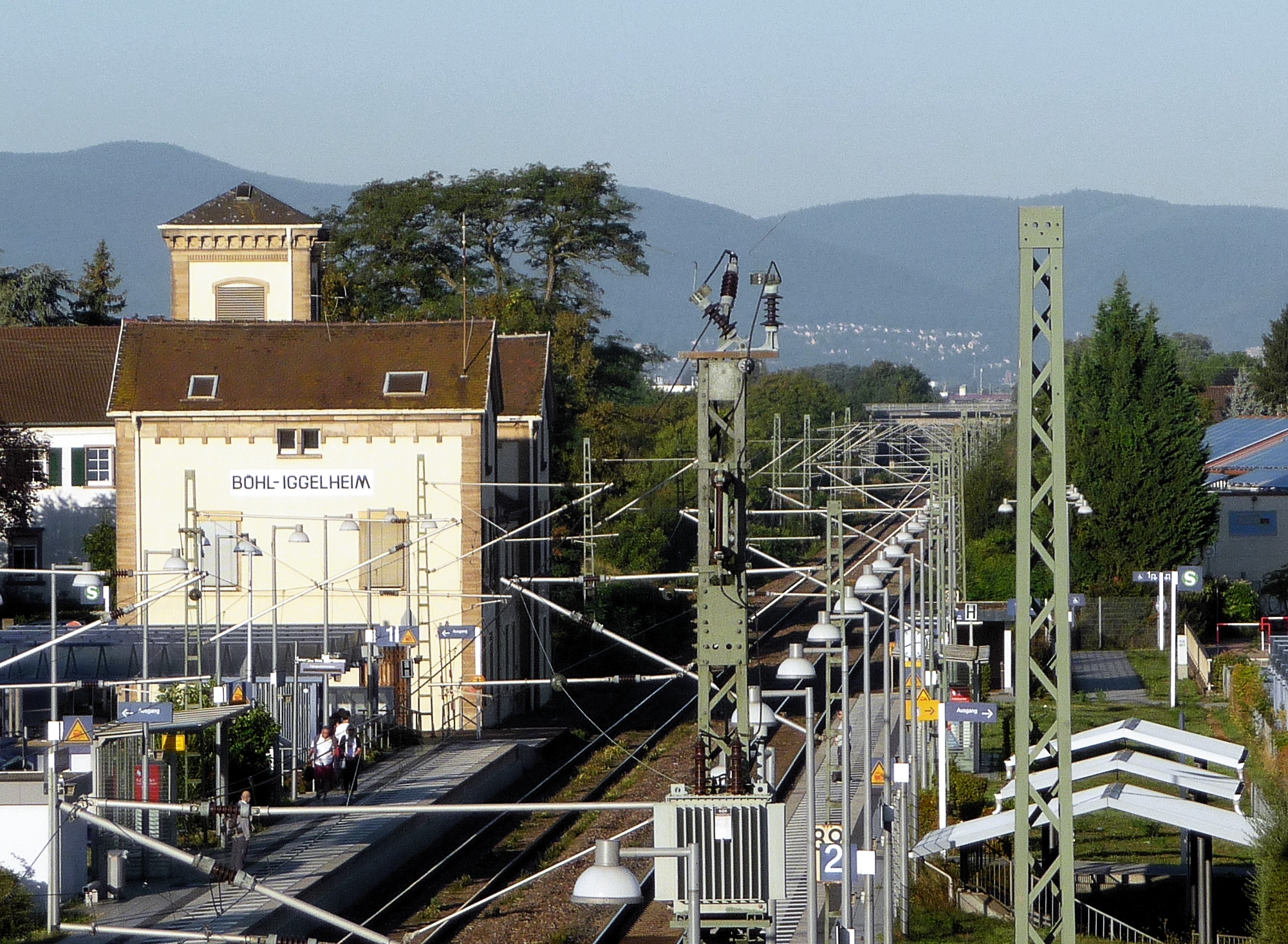
Böhl-Iggelheim station

A former railway station and now classified as a halt, Böhl-Iggelheim is located on the south-eastern edge of Böhl; A kilometre away is Iggelheim. In the first years of its existence it was called Böhl. Its entrance building is a protected monument.

=== Haßloch (Pfalz) ===
Haßloch (Pfalz) station is located on the northern outskirts of Haßloch. Since the original entrance building had been damaged in the Second World War, it was replaced in 1961 by a new one.

=== Neustadt (Weinstr) Böbig ===
The stop is located in the north-east of the town centre of Neustadt an der Weinstraße and mainly serves the school centre of Böbig. It is a "station part" (Bahnhofsteil) of Neustadt Hauptbahnhof. It is at the junction of the line to Mannheim and the Northern Railway to Monsheim. The first plans for its construction were completed in 1965. It was opened in 1974 to enable the transfer of some of the transport for students from buses to rail. The driving force for its emergence was the then teacher and later VRN official, Werner Schreiner.

=== Neustadt (Weinstr) Hauptbahnhof ===
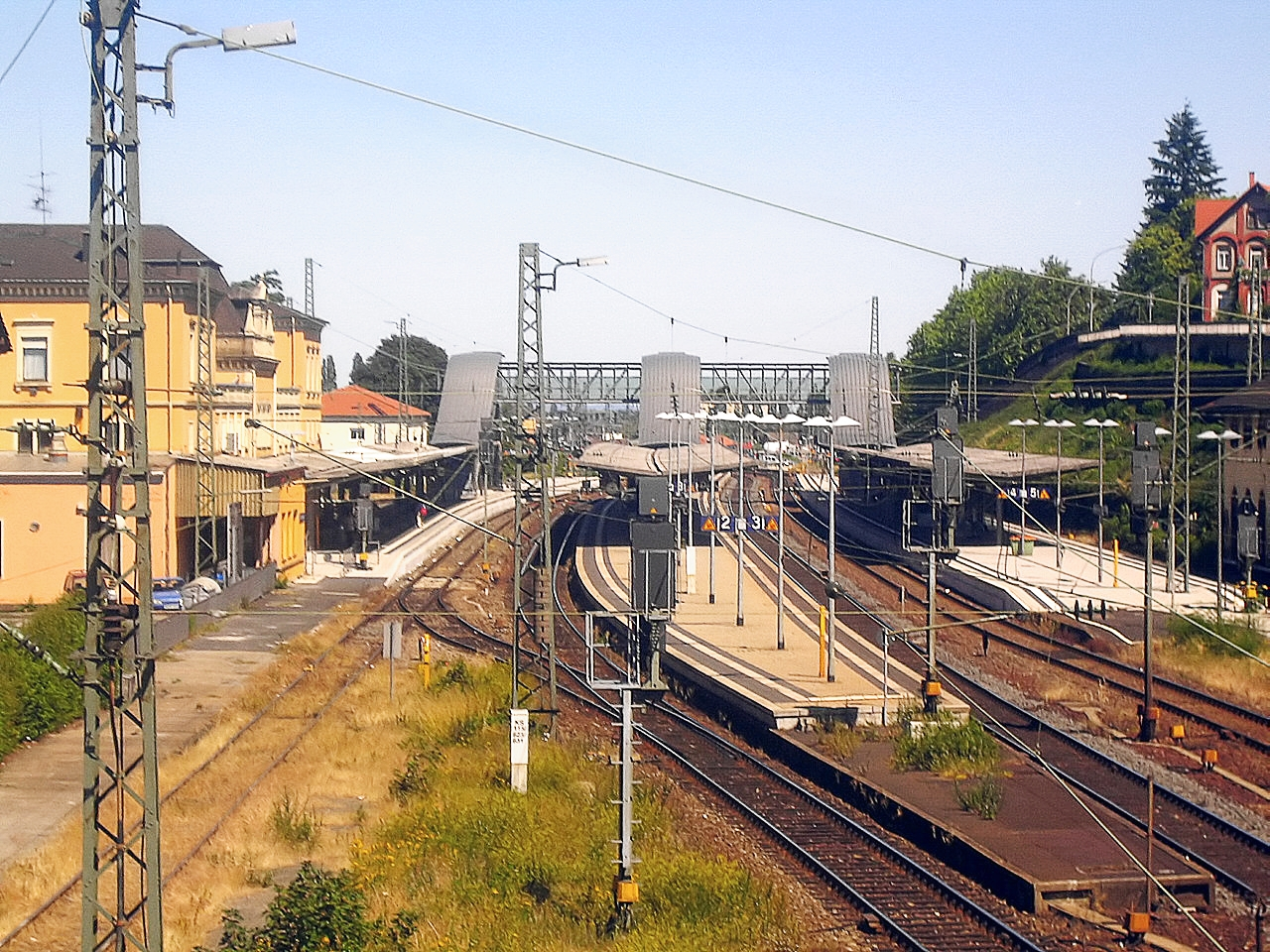
Neustadt (Weinstraße) Hauptbahnhof

The station was opened in 1847 as the terminus of the first section of the Ludwig Railway, from which the present Mannheim–Saarbrücken railway later developed. It was originally called Neustadt (Haardt). With the opening of the Maximilian Railway, it became the third railway junction in the Palatinate, after Schifferstadt (1847) and Ludwigshafen (1853). Later, the Palatine Northern Railway (Pfälzische Nordbahn) was added, which ended at Bad Dürkheim and was extended to Monsheim in 1873. The track layout had to be expanded, which required the demolition of the original entrance building. Its successor building is under monument protection.

After the completion of the Alsenz Valley Railway, the station developed into a major intercity hub. After the First World War, north–south traffic lost importance, with the remaining long-distance traffic running in the east–west direction. The station has been electrified since 12 March 1964. It was modernised with its integration into the Rhine-Neckar S-Bahn in 2003.

=== Schöntal ===
The Schönental loading point (Verladestelle) was located in the Schöntal area, which is part of the city of Neustadt, and was only used by freight traffic. As early as 1869 there was a freight yard at the location. Subsequently, demands were made to expand these into a fully-fledged station, but they were rejected by the Palatinate Railway because of the short distance to Neustadt station. The Bavarian State Railways upgraded it to a freight station (Güterbahnhof). Later, the freight yard was officially a refuge loop (Ausweichanschlussstelle). From it, a connecting track branched off to Achatmühle, which circumnavigated the Wolfsberg. The track has been dismantled for decades and the loading point was abandoned in 2005.

=== Lindenberg-Knöckel ===
This siding was on the southern outskirts of Lindenberg (Pfalz) and served the Knöckel, Schmidt & Cie paper factory. It could only be accessed by using the eastbound track for trains running to Neustadt but running to the west. The company main traffic was the supply of coal before it became insolvent in 2005. The points that connected to the siding were dismantled in 2011.

=== Lambrecht (Pfalz) ===
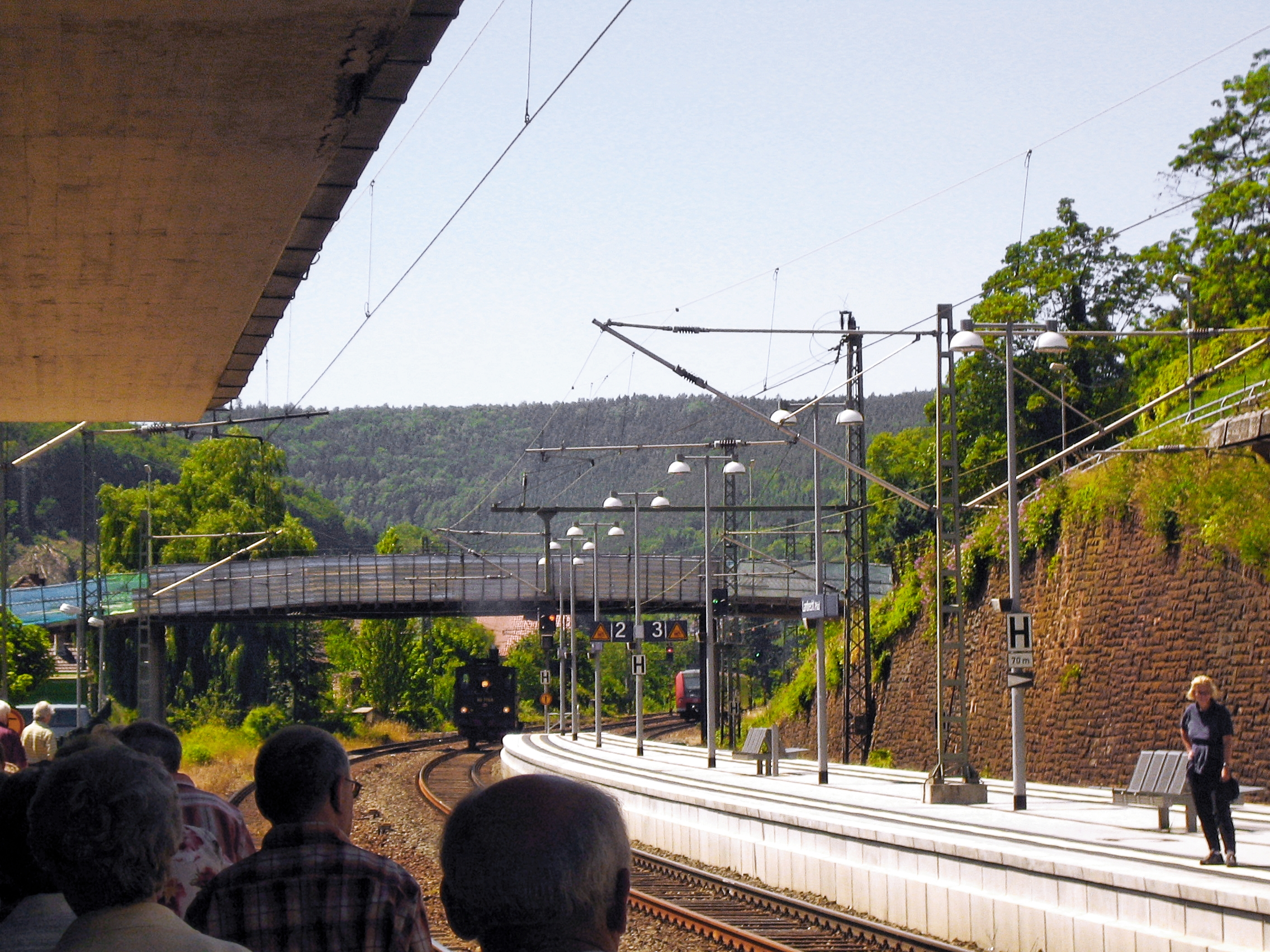
Lambrecht (Pfalz) station with a moving locomotive of the Little Cuckoo Railway

Lambrecht (Pfalz) station is located on the northern outskirts of Lambrecht (Pfalz). Since 1909, the Little Cuckoo Railway has branched off there; since 1984 it has been a heritage railway. The original entrance building was built in the architectural style of the Palatinate used in the second half of the 19th century, especially for railway stations. It was burnt down in the Second World War during military action. The current station building dates from 1957, but it is no longer used for railway operations. The station has been electrified since 12 March 1964.

The previous freight shed, which had most recently served as a private residence, was demolished in 1999 to build a parking area. With the commissioning of the electronic interlocking in Neustadt on 16 May of the same year, the station lost its last staffed position. In addition, Deutsche Bundesbahn dismantled several tracks, so that the station has only had three platform tracks since then.

=== Neidenfels ===
The halt of Neidenfels is located on the southern outskirts of Neidenfels on an S-curve and is classified as a category 6 station. It was commissioned on 31 January 1998. Already in the 19th century there were calls for a station there, but the railway administration pointed out that the gradient of the line in this area made the braking of trains there too difficult.

Just a few years after the Rhine-Neckar S-Bahn was opened, trains had to run with three sets coupled together due to the high demand between Neustadt and Kaiserslautern. Due to the short platform length, they were initially unable to stop in Neidenfels. For this reason, the platform was extended to the north to a total length of 210 metres over a period of five months in 2010. The opening took place in November of the year. There are some nearby hiking trails.

=== Weidenthal ===
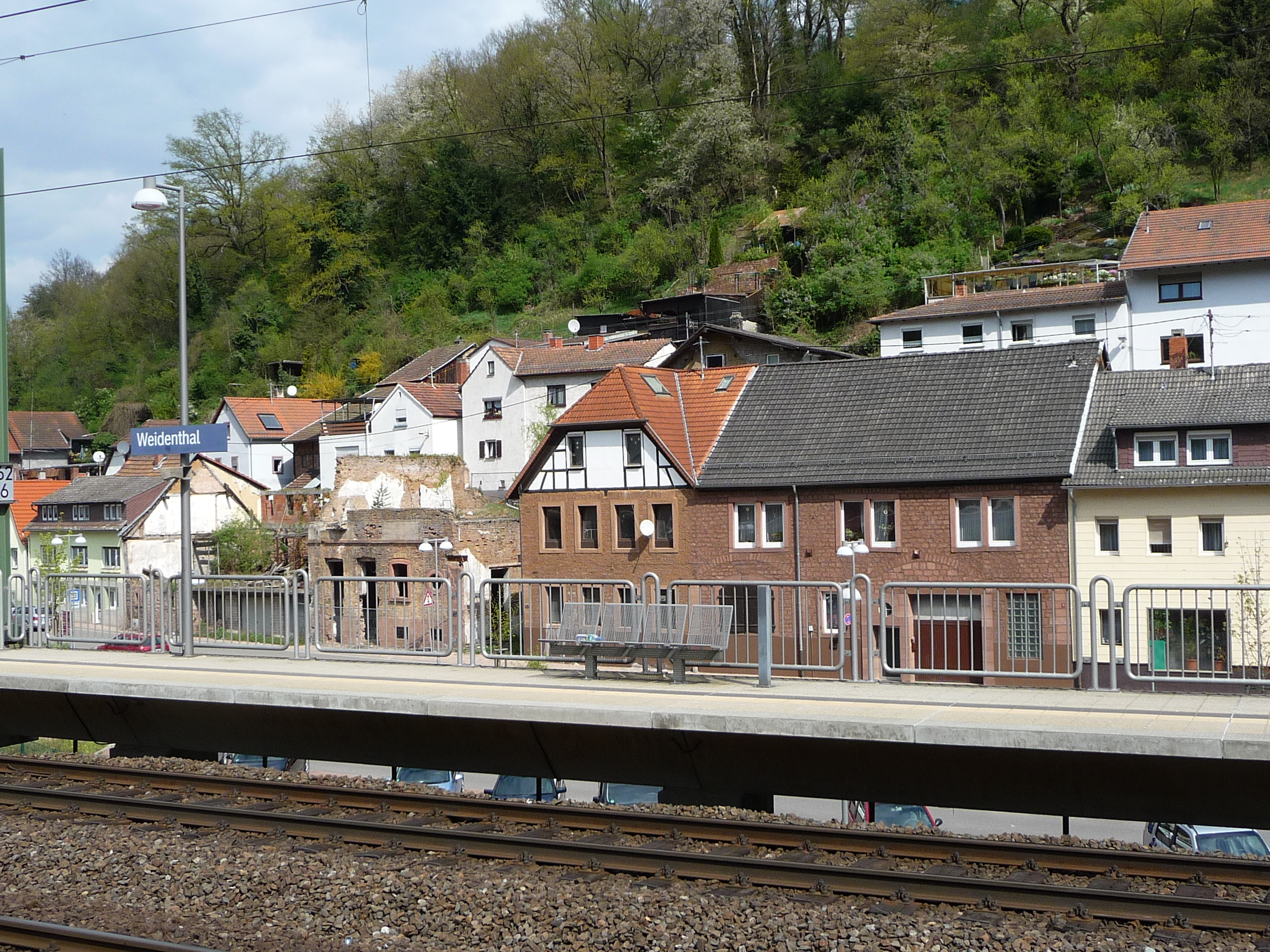
Weidenthal station

The three-track Weidenthal station is located in the south of the district of Weidenthal and is classified as a category 5 station. The station's platform used to be located in the southern part of the station, where the former entrance building is located. In the course of the construction work for the Rhine-Neckar S-Bahn, new platforms were built around 800 metres further north.

The station has three railway tracks, the middle one of which is a crossing loop. It is one of three places where trains can overtake between Neustadt and Kaiserslautern.

The local stone quarry was an important freight customer with its own connecting tracks. There, grindstones and millstones were produced and loaded in the first decades. The connecting track from Weidenthal station is currently used by the Feinpapierfabrik Glatz paper factory in nearby Neidenfels.

=== Frankenstein (Pfalz) ===
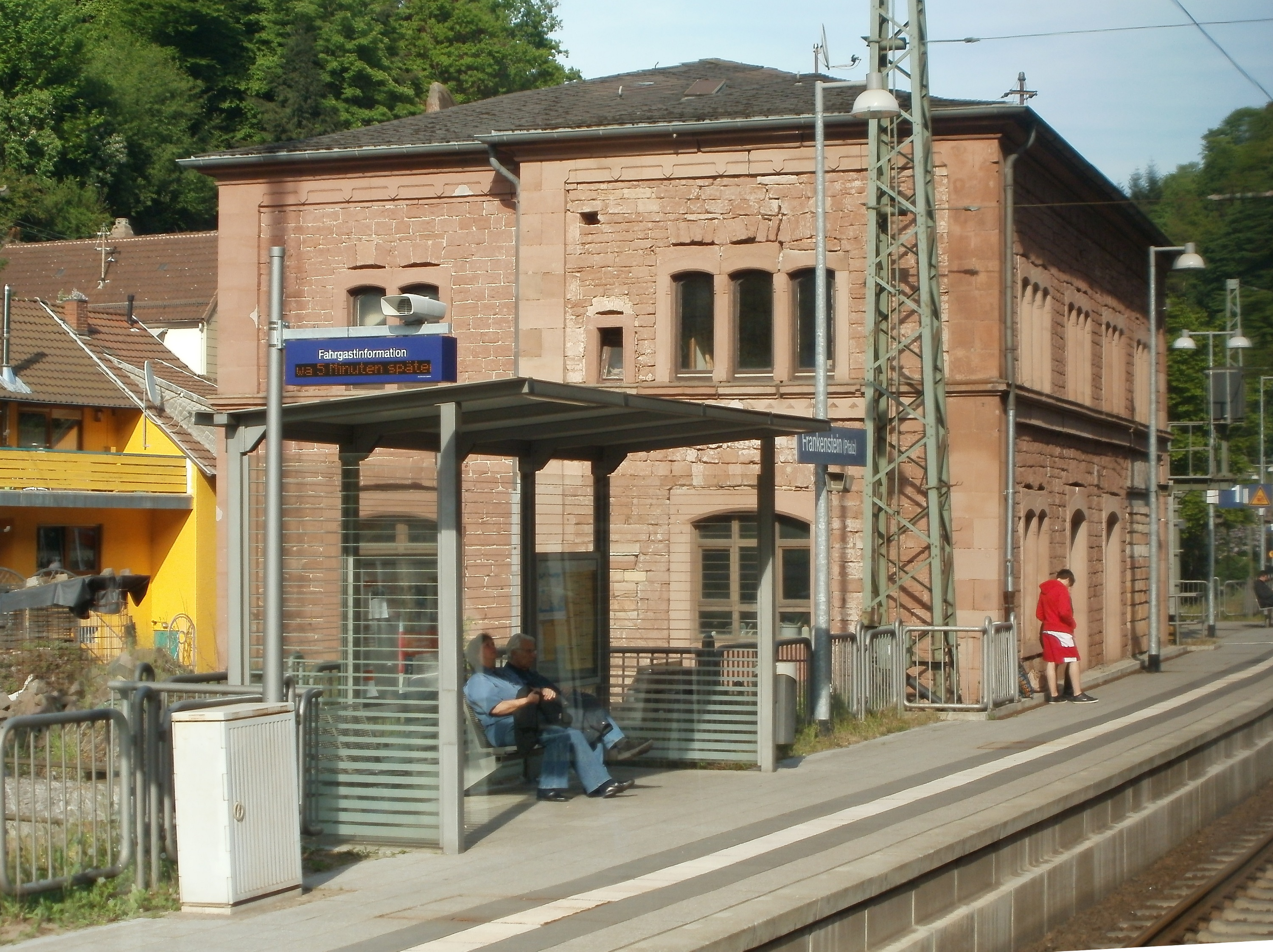
Frankenstein station

The interests of Paul Camille Denis, the builder of the Ludwig Railway, played an important role in the origin of the earlier Frankenstein (Pfalz) station. He settled down temporarily in the village, acquired Diemerstein Castle and built a villa, the so-called Villa Denis, in the immediate vicinity. From 2 December 1848 until 25 August 1949, the station was the eastern terminus of the western section of the Ludwig Railway, coming from Bexbach. It is located on the west side of Frankenstein. Immediately to the east is the Schlossberg Tunnel, which is built through the Schlossberg ("palace mountain") on which Diemerstein Castle is built. North of the station is the village of Diemerstein.

The heritage-listed entrance building was architecturally very sophisticated for a locality the size of Frankenstein; this was also due to the influence of Denis. It is built in the style of a Schloss (palace).

=== Hochspeyer Ost ===
The Hochspeyer Ost (east) operating point (abbreviated SHY O) is administered as part of Hochspeyer station and is located in the east of the municipality of Hochspeyer. From it the connecting curve branches off to the Alsenz Valley Railway, used by the long-distance trains on the Bingerbrück – Neustadt – Strasbourg route. It is currently rarely used.

=== Hochspeyer ===
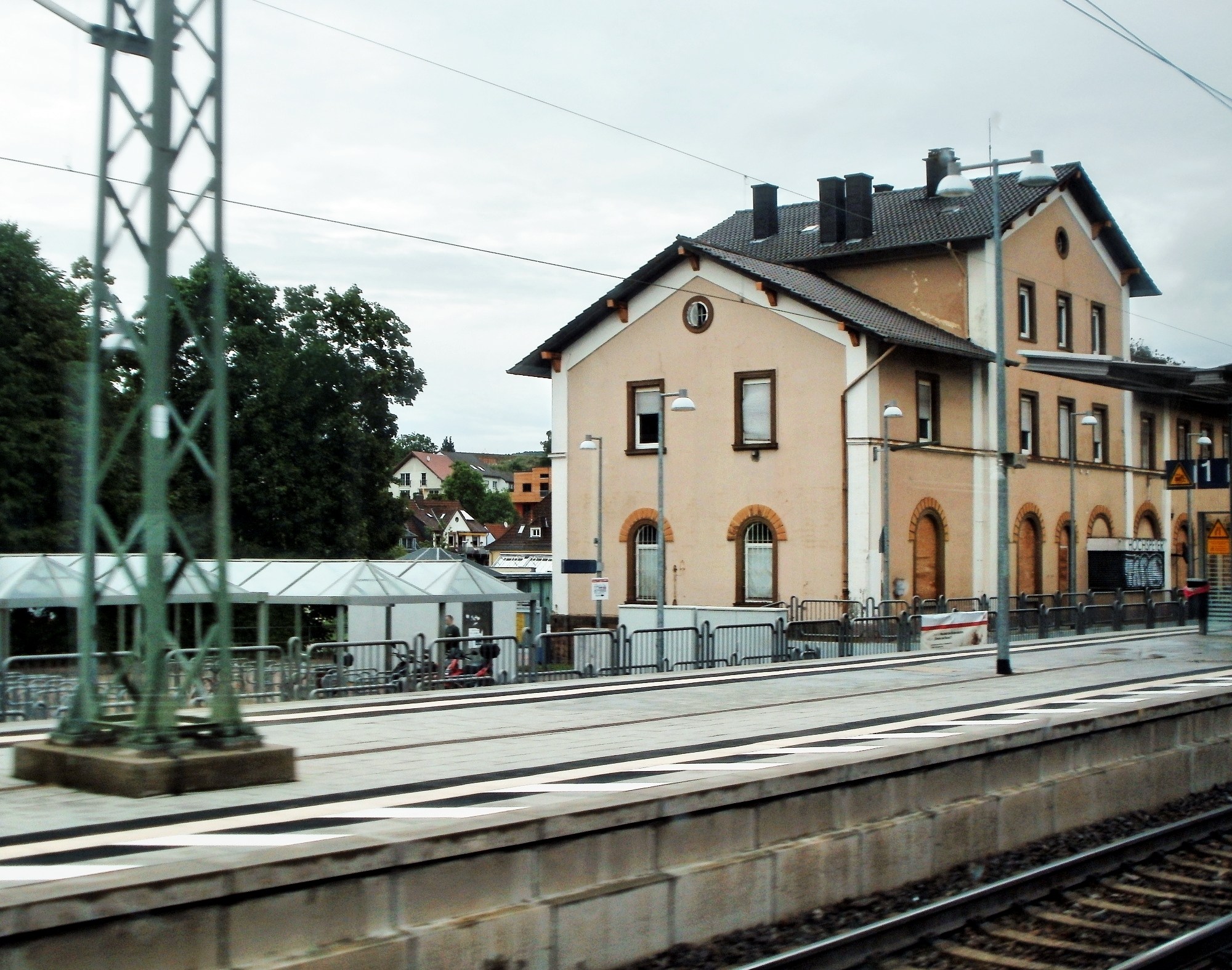
Hochspeyer station

Hochspeyer station, which is located in the east of the built-up area, was built with the Alsenz Valley Railway, which branches off here, in 1870 and 1871. In this way, it became the eighth railway junction within the Palatinate. Its entrance building, which is no longer used for railway operations, corresponds to the architectural style that was applied to the other stations along the Alsenz as well as between Landau and Zweibrücken. Despite its status as a railway junction, it lost part of this importance with the opening in 1875 of the Kaiserslautern–Enkenbach railway.

On 1 May 2007, the functions of the signal box, which was housed in the entrance building, were taken over by the signalling control centre in Karlsruhe, so the local controller was no longer required and the station is now remotely controlled. Previously, the station had other signal boxes. One of them was on the overpass of federal highway 48 and has since been renovated and turned into a restaurant. It was originally built by Deutsche Reichsbahn.

=== Althochspeyer ===
Althochspeyer (old Hochspeyer) station was in the west of Hochspeyer near Heidestrasse. It was the original station of the municipality of Hochspeyer. Its construction was only agreed to after the construction of the railway commenced. In the statistical yearbooks it was often called Bahnhof am Kreuz ("station at the crossing"). With the opening of the Alsenz Valley Railway and the new Hochspeyer station, it lost its function for passenger transport and was given the new name of Althochspeyer. Because a chemical company had been established in its area and because of its importance to the wood industry, it continued to be used as a freight yard. During the time of the Royal Bavarian State Railways (Königlich Bayerischen Staatseisenbahnen) it was assigned to category 4. Deutsche Reichsbahn closed it In the 1930s. Its former entrance building was then used for apartments for railway workers.

=== Kaiserslautern Hauptbahnhof ===
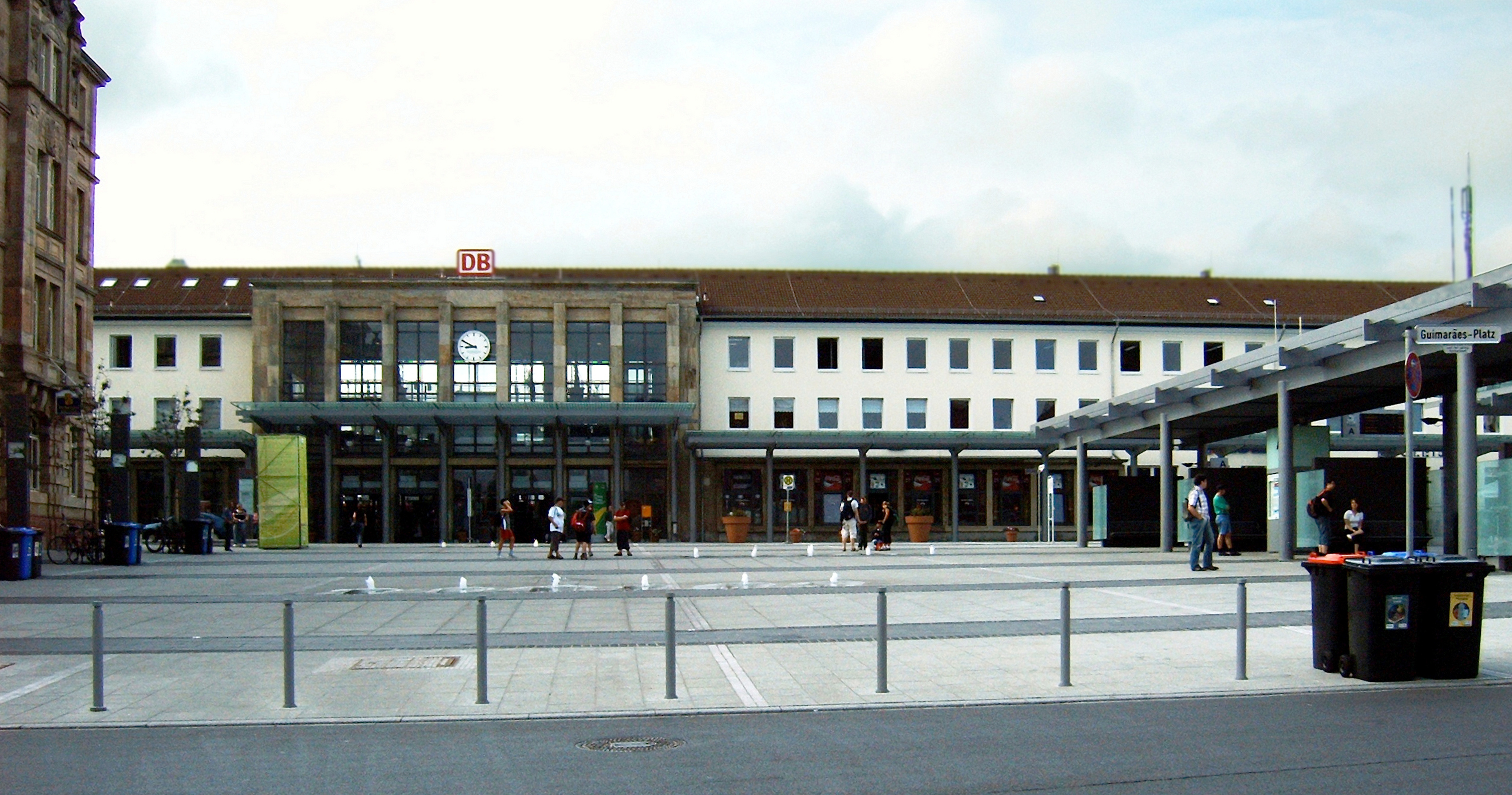
Kaiserslautern Hauptbahnhof

Kaiserslauter Hauptbahnhof was opened on 1 July 1848 with the Homburg–Kaiserslautern section of the Ludwig Railway. Half a year later, the line was extended to Frankenstein and the line was completed from Rheinschanze to Bexbach. In spite of its importance, it did not become a railway junction until 1875 with the opening of the Kaiserslautern–Enkenbach railway, which served as a connection to the Alsenz Valley Railway and the Donnersberg Railway (Donnersbergbahn). It received a new entrance building in 1879. In addition, the station gained in importance with the opening of the Lauter Valley Railway in 1883 and the completion of the Biebermühl Railway (Biebermühlbahn) to Pirmasens in 1913. The second station building was badly damaged in the Second World War and demolished after the war.

=== Kennelgarten ===
The halt of Kennelgarten is located in the west of the city of Kaiserslautern. Deutsche Reichsbahn opened it on 1 January 1927. It primarily served the settlement of Siedlung Bahnheim built for the families of railwaymen on the principles of the Garden city movement of Ebenezer Howard.

=== Kaiserslautern-Ausbesserungswerk ===
The former halt of Kaiserslautern-Ausbesserungswerk was located at a Ausbesserungswerk (repair shop) in the Kaiserslautern district of Vogelweh and had an island platform. It only served the repair shop traffic and there was no public access. The halt was abandoned after the works lost its importance. The island platform and canopy were demolished in the middle of 2015.

=== Vogelweh, Einsiedlerhof and Einsiedlerhof marshalling yard ===
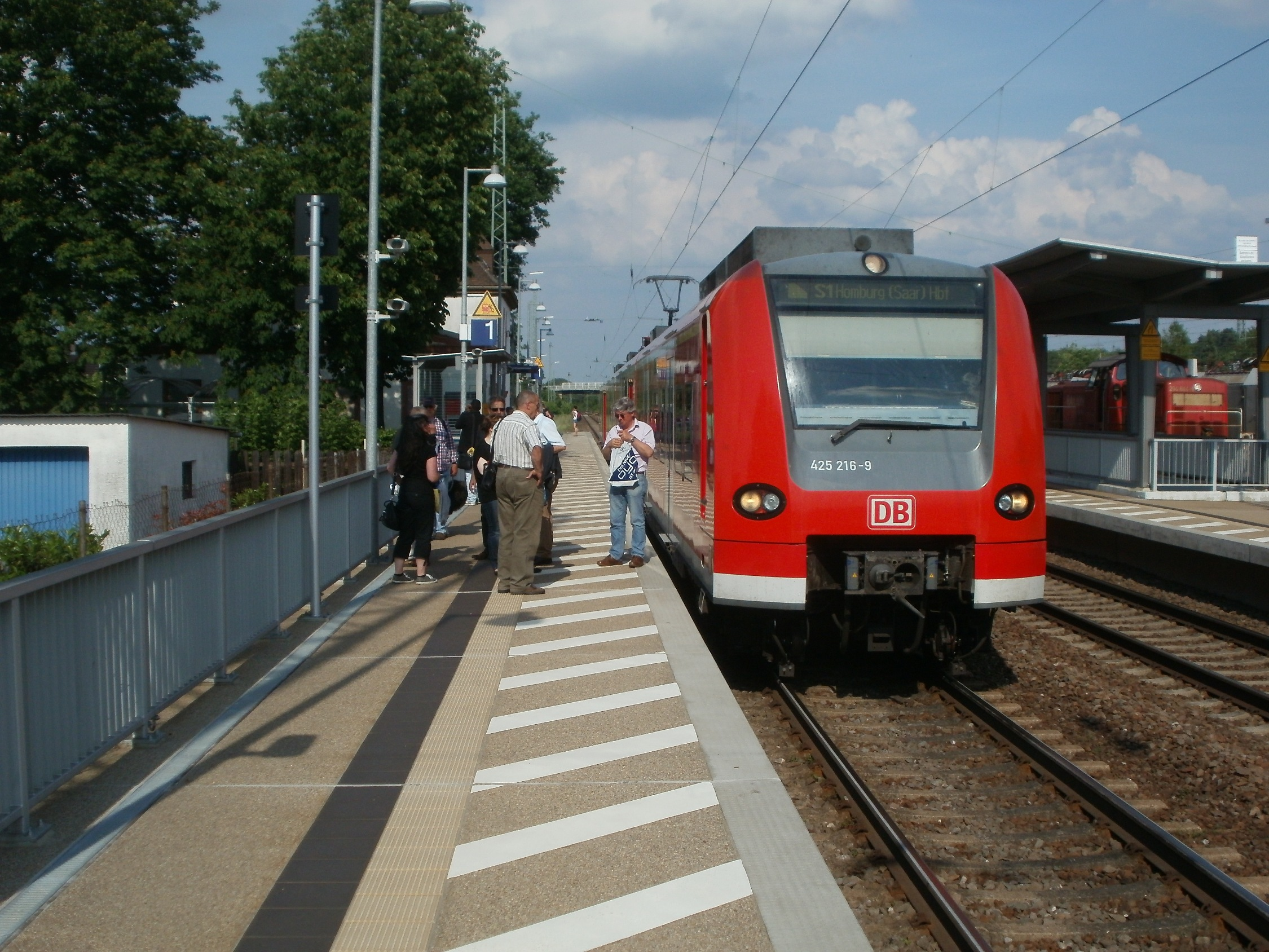
Einsiedlerhof station

The Einsiedlerhof Rangierbahnhof (marshalling yard) was completed in 1921 because its predecessor at the Kaiserslautern Hauptbahnhof had reached the limits of its capacity. Since then, it has been a yard for freight trains within the Western Palatinate. In recent decades, it has lost importance because of the increasing shift of freight to road transport.

In its catchment area, there are two passenger halts at Einsiedlerhof and Vogelweh. Einsiedlerhof halt was built around 1900 and was rebuilt as a station with the construction of the Einsiedlerhof marshalling yard and received a new entrance building, which is no longer used. Vogelweh halt is located on the north-western edge of the Vogelweh district of Kaiserslauter and was opened after the Second World War. Einsiedlerhof halt is centrally located within the Einsiedlerhof district.

=== Kindsbach ===
Kindsbach station was founded after 1871 and is located in the north-west of the local community of Kindsbach. It belongs to station category 6 and is served by the services of the Rhine-Neckar S-Bahn and Regionalbahn services on the Kaiserslautern–Kusel route. From the 1920s onwards, the company of Formsandwerke Ludwigshafen am Rhein, which quarried moulding sand and transported it by cableway to the station, was a significant freight customer.

=== Landstuhl ===
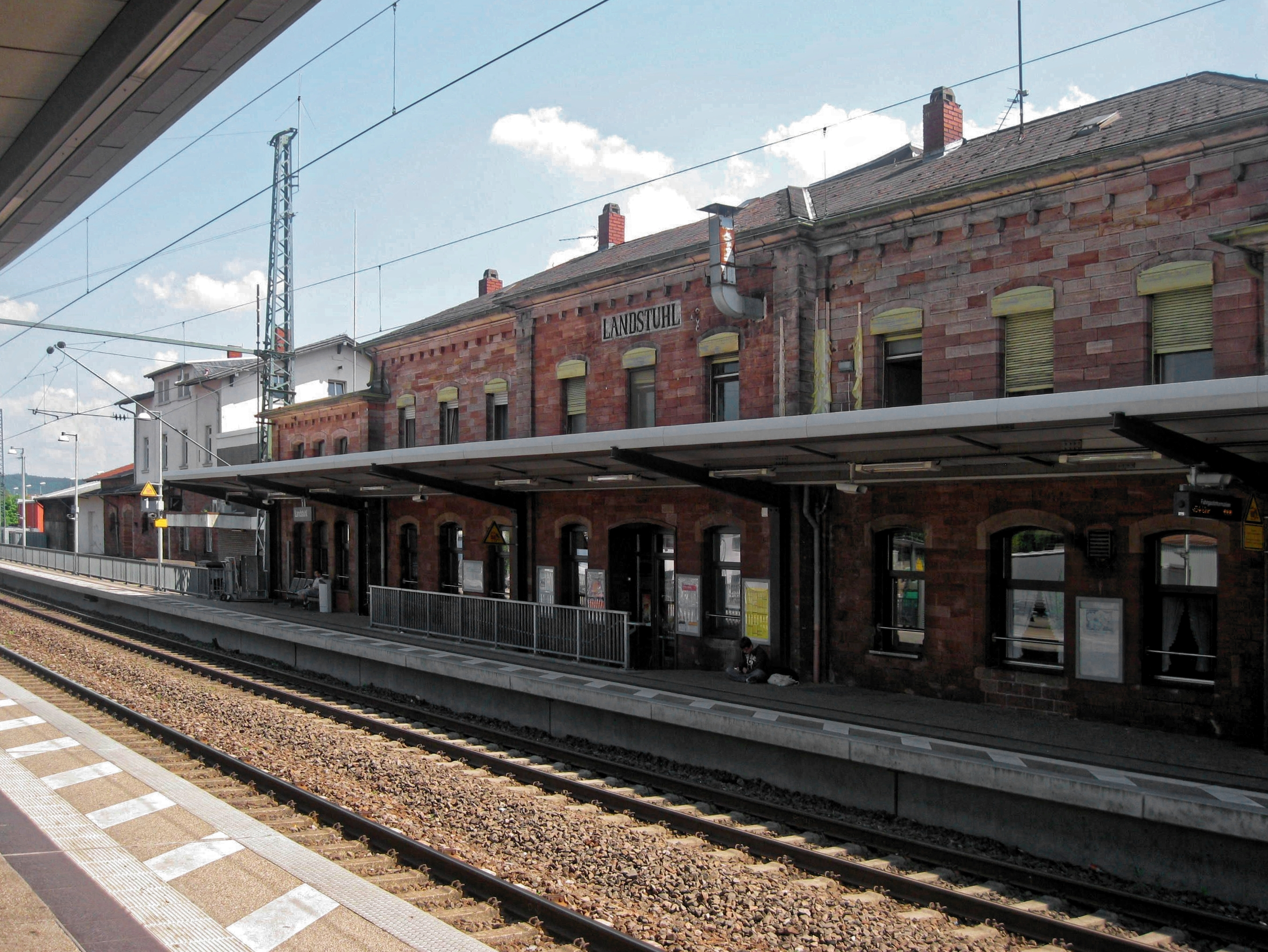
Landstuhl station

Landstuhl station is located on the northern outskirts of Landstuhl and has four tracks. It was commissioned in 1848 with the Kaiserslautern–Homburg section of the Ludwig Railway. It was always the most important intermediate station on this section. Since 1868, the line to Kusel has branched off to the northwest of the station. Thus the station was the seventh railway junction in the Palatinate after Schifferstadt (1847), Ludwigshafen (1853), Neustadt an der Haardt (1855), Homburg (1857), Winden (1864) and Schwarzenacker (1866). It is served by S-Bahn, Regionalbahn, Regional-Express and occasional InterCity services. Freight traffic at the station has been abandoned.

=== Hauptstuhl ===
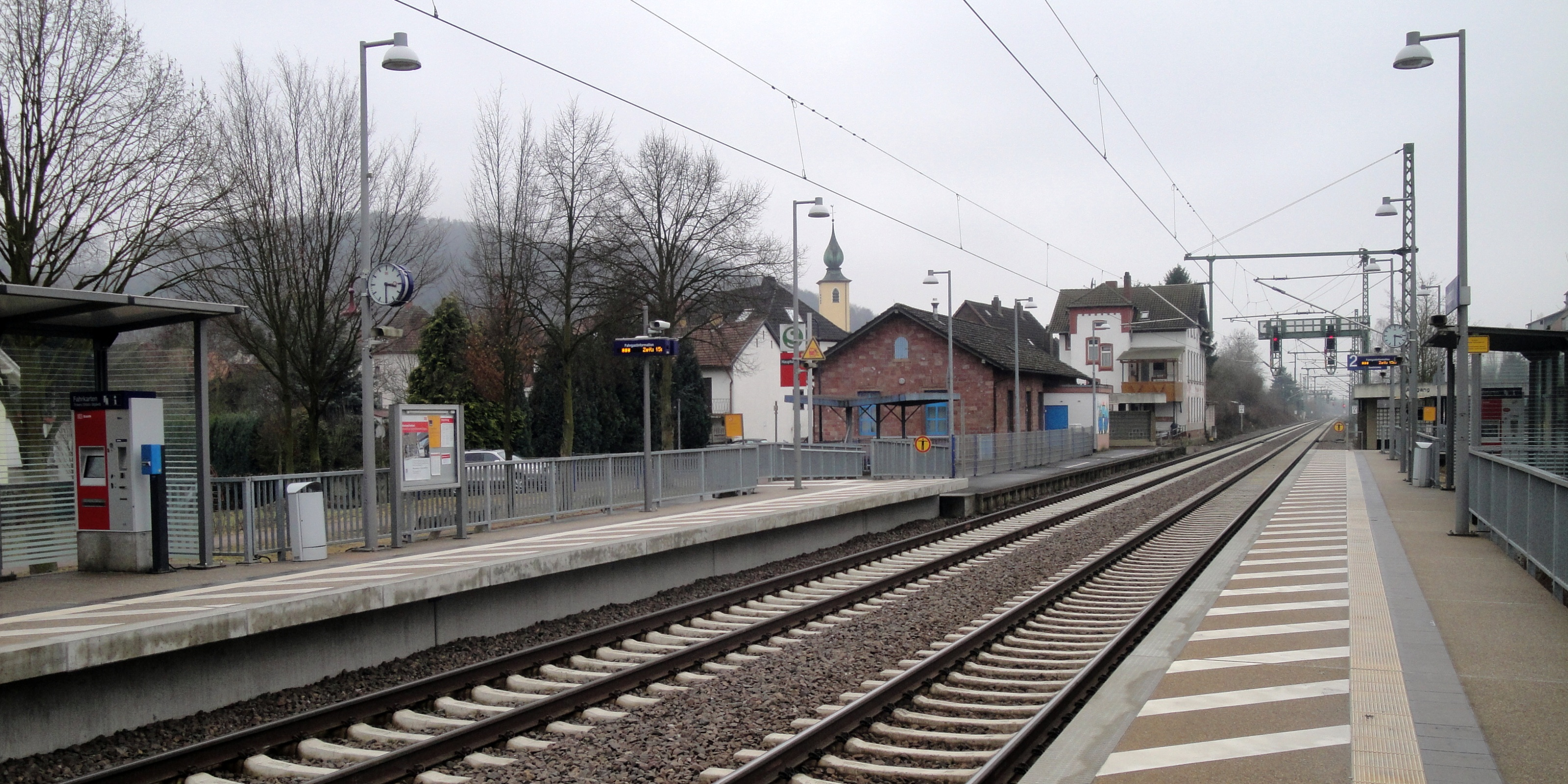
Hauptstuhl station

Hauptstuhl station is located in the north of the municipality of Hauptstuhl. It belongs to station category 6. The conversion of the station for the operations of the Rhine-Neckar S-Bahn resulted in the shortening of the platforms. In the northern part of the station, there used to be facilities for goods transport, but they have been dismantled. The former entrance building is no longer used for railway purposes. The municipality bought it and converted it into a community hall. A siding branches off from the station to the Miesau Army Depot of the US Army.

=== Bruchmühlbach-Miesau ===
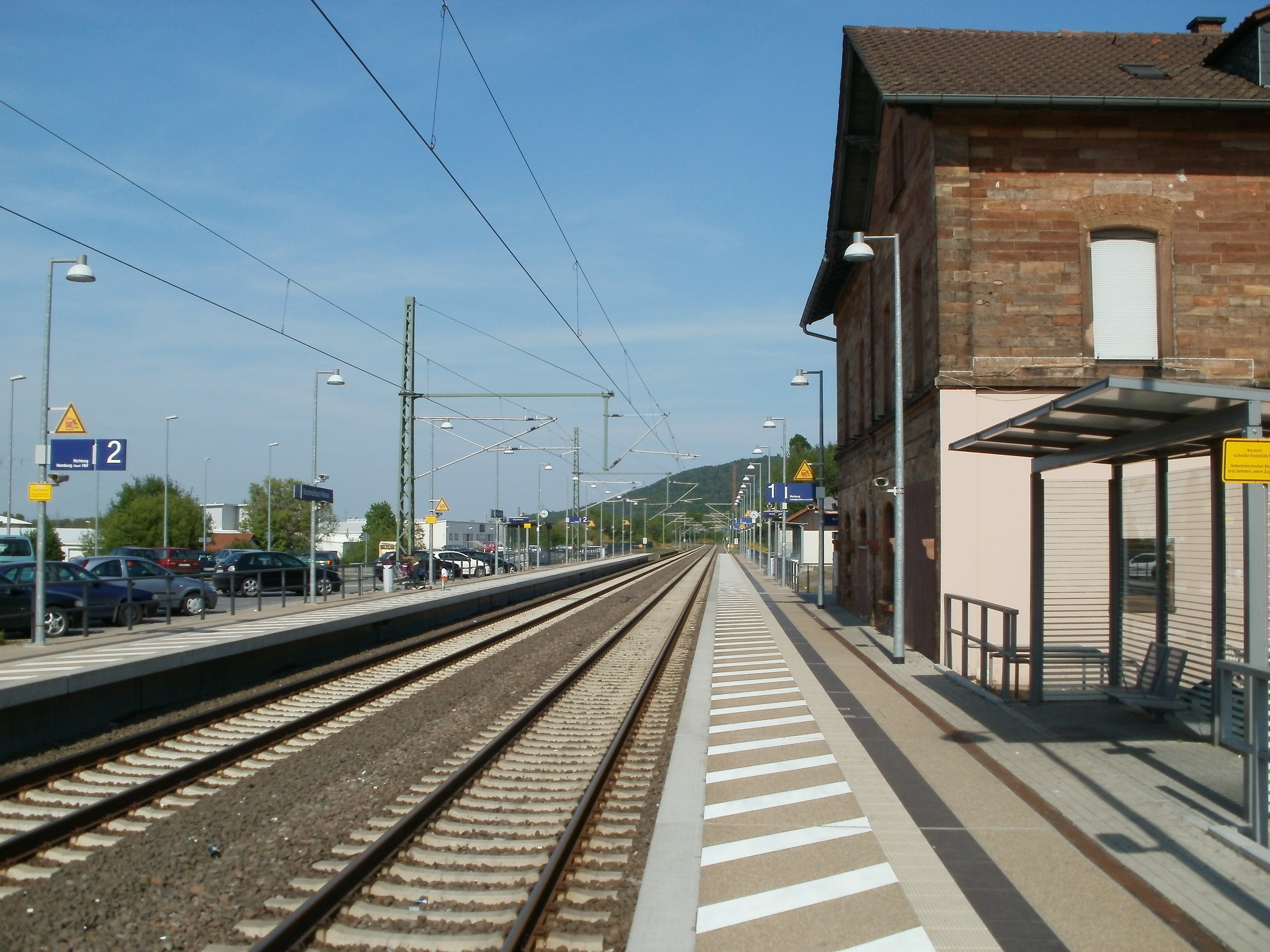
Bruchmühlbach-Miesau station

The former Bruchmühlbach-Miesau station, which is now classified as a halt, was originally called just Bruchmühlbach. During the time when the Saarland was not yet part of the Federal Republic of Germany, border controls (immigration and customs) were located here. After the creation of the municipality of Bruchmühlbach-Miesau in the Rhineland-Palatinate administrative reform, the station was given its current name. It is located at the western end of Bruchmühlbach and is classified as a category 6 station. With the upgrade of the line for long-distance transport and its integration into the network of the Rhine-Neckar S-Bahn, an adjacent level crossing was replaced by a road bridge and the pedestrian footbridge was replaced by a pedestrian underpass.

=== Eichelscheid ===
The former Eichelscheid station was located in the Homburg district of Bruchhof-Sanddorf. It was opened in the beginning of the 1890s and was originally called Eichelscheid-Lambsborn. Its passenger services mainly served the residents of the municipalities of Bechhofen, Lambsborn, Rosenkopf and Wiesbach. The discharge of fertiliser played a major role in its freight traffic. From 1947, it functioned as a customs station because of the separation of the Saar area from West Germany. Deutsche Bundesbahn closed the station with the absorption of the Saarland into West Germany in 1959.

=== Homburg (Saar) Hauptbahnhof ===
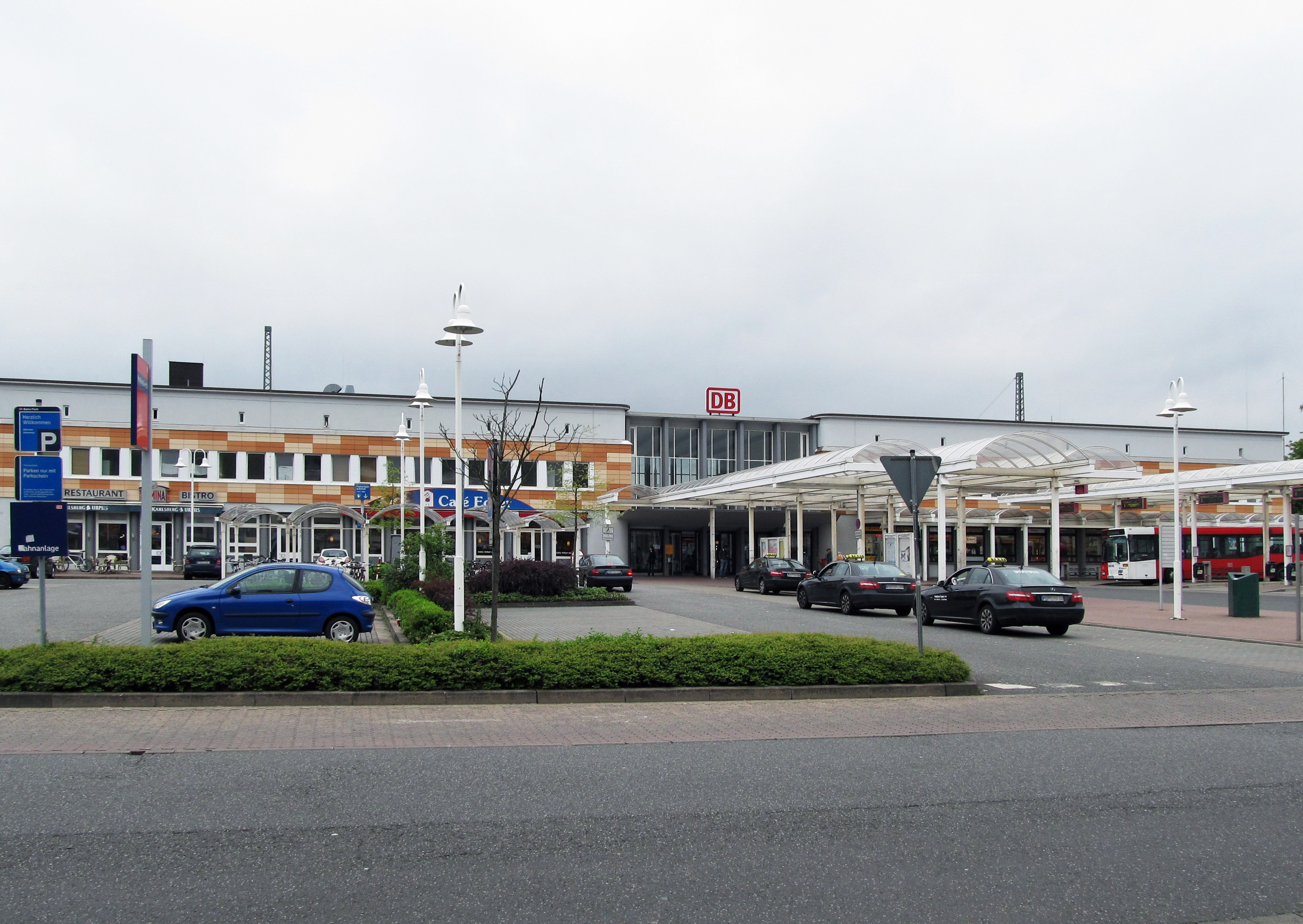
Homburg (Saar) Hauptbahnhof

It was called Homburg (Pfalz) station until 1923. It was opened in 1848 along with the Kaiserslautern–Homburg section of the Ludwig Railway. The now closed Homburg–Zweibrücken railway was opened in 1857. Thus, it became the fourth railway junction in the Palatinate after Schifferstadt (1847), Ludwigshafen (1853), and Neustadt (1855).

The Homburg–Limbach–Kirkel–Rohrbach line, which followed on 1 January 1904, like the Glan Valley Railway, which was opened four months later, was built as a strategic railway. After the First World War the station was part of the Territory of the Saar Basin and after the Second World War part of the Saarland, so it has been called Homburg (Saar) since then. As a result of the territorial change, the trains of the Blies Valley Railway (Bliestalbahn) tended to run to Homburg instead of Zweibrücken as previously. Passenger services to Zweibrücken ended in 1989 and to the Blies valley in 1991. In addition to being located on the main line from Mannheim to Saarbrücken, the station is the eastern terminus of the line from Neunkirchen, which is part of the historical Ludwig Railway from Bexbach.

=== Zollbahnhof Homburg (Saar) West ===
The Zollbahnhof Homburg (Saar) West (Homburg (Saar) West customs station) was built as a result of the creation of the Territory of the Saar Basin in 1920. It was built north of the railway opened in 1904 on the border between Homburg and the communities of Limbach and Altstadt. There were connecting curves to the lines to Neunkirchen and Zweibrücken. Homburg (Saar) West halt was built on the existing line near the customs station to serve its workers.

=== Limbach (b Homburg, Saar) ===
Originally the station was called Limbach-Altstadt. DB rebuilt it as halt with the modernisation of the Mannheim–Saarbrücken railway. It is centrally located within Limbach and belongs to station category 6. In 2007, two outside platforms replaced the existing island platform. The former entrance building is no longer used for railway operations.

=== Kirkel ===
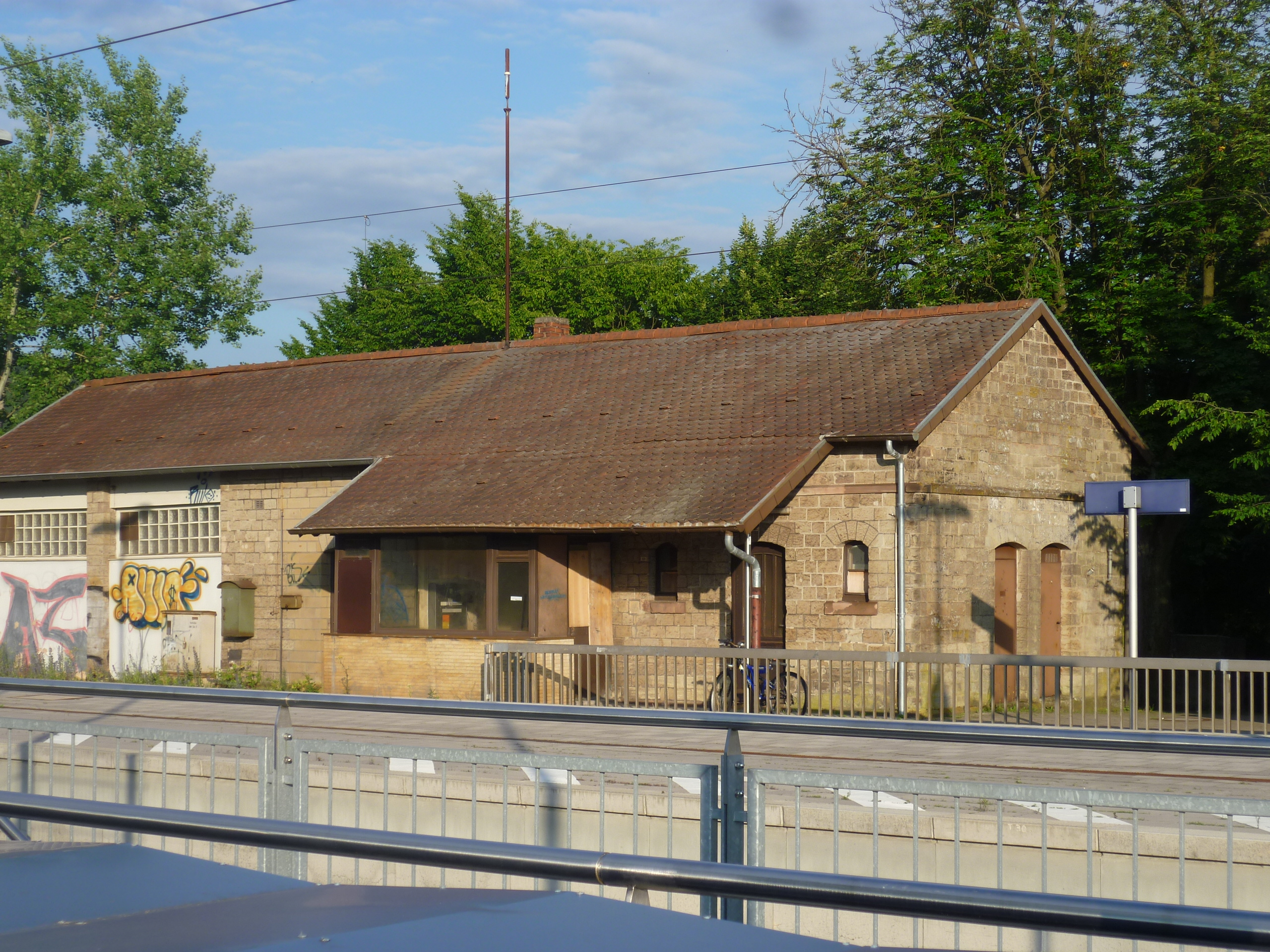
Kirkel station

Kirkel station is located on the north-western outskirts of Kirkel and is classified as a category 6 station. It was opened on 1 January 1904 with the Homburg–Rohrbach railway. It was originally called Kirkel-Neuhäusel.

=== Rohrbach (Saar) ===
Rohrbach (Saar) station is located on the south-western outskirts of Rohrbach and is classified as a category 6 station. It was opened in 1895 as part of the bypass of the Würzbach Railway (Würzbachbahn) that was built from Schwarzenacker to St. Ingbert because the Hasseler Tunnel had turned out to be a problem for railway operations. It became a railway junction with the opening of the Homburg–Rohrbach section in 1904. Since then, the line now called the Landau–Rohrbach railway has had its western terminus at the station.

=== St. Ingbert ===
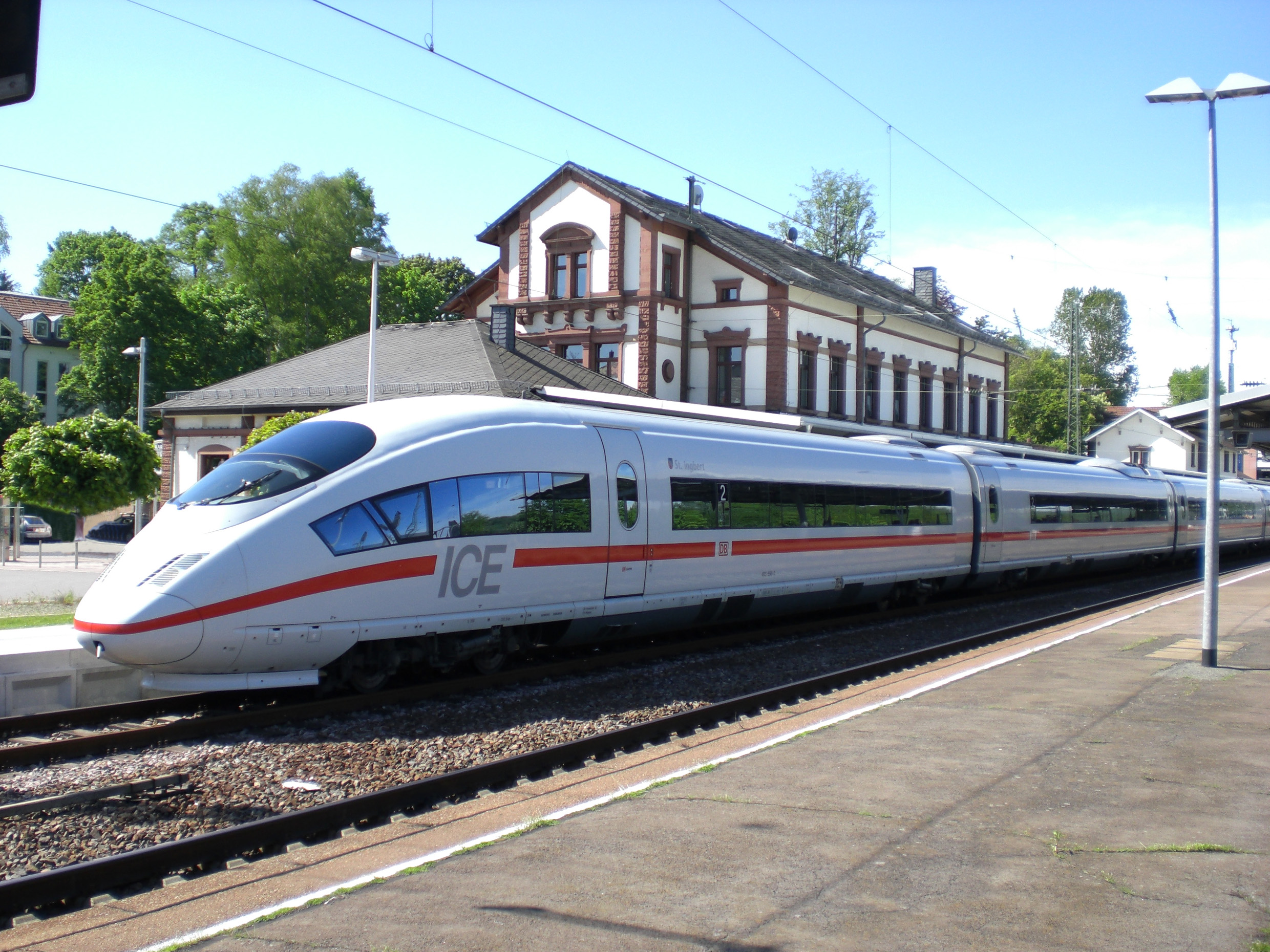
St. Ingbert station

St. Ingbert station belongs to station category 3. It was created in 1867 as the western terminus of the Würzbach Railway starting in Schwarzenacker and was at that time the most western station within the then Palatinate. It became a through station with the extension of the line to Saarbrücken in 1879. At the same time, it received its current entrance building, which has been rebuilt over the years. To the east of the station the line was given a new course in 1895 due to the problems of the Hasseler Tunnel. The station is the only stop for regional trains on the Saarbrücken–Pirmasens route between Rohrbach and Saarbrücken.

=== Rentrisch ===
Rentrisch station is located on the western edge of the St. Ingbert district of Rentrisch and belongs to station category 6. It was opened on 7 February 1932. In the meantime it has been reconstructed as a halt. It has an island platform.

=== Scheidt (Saar) ===
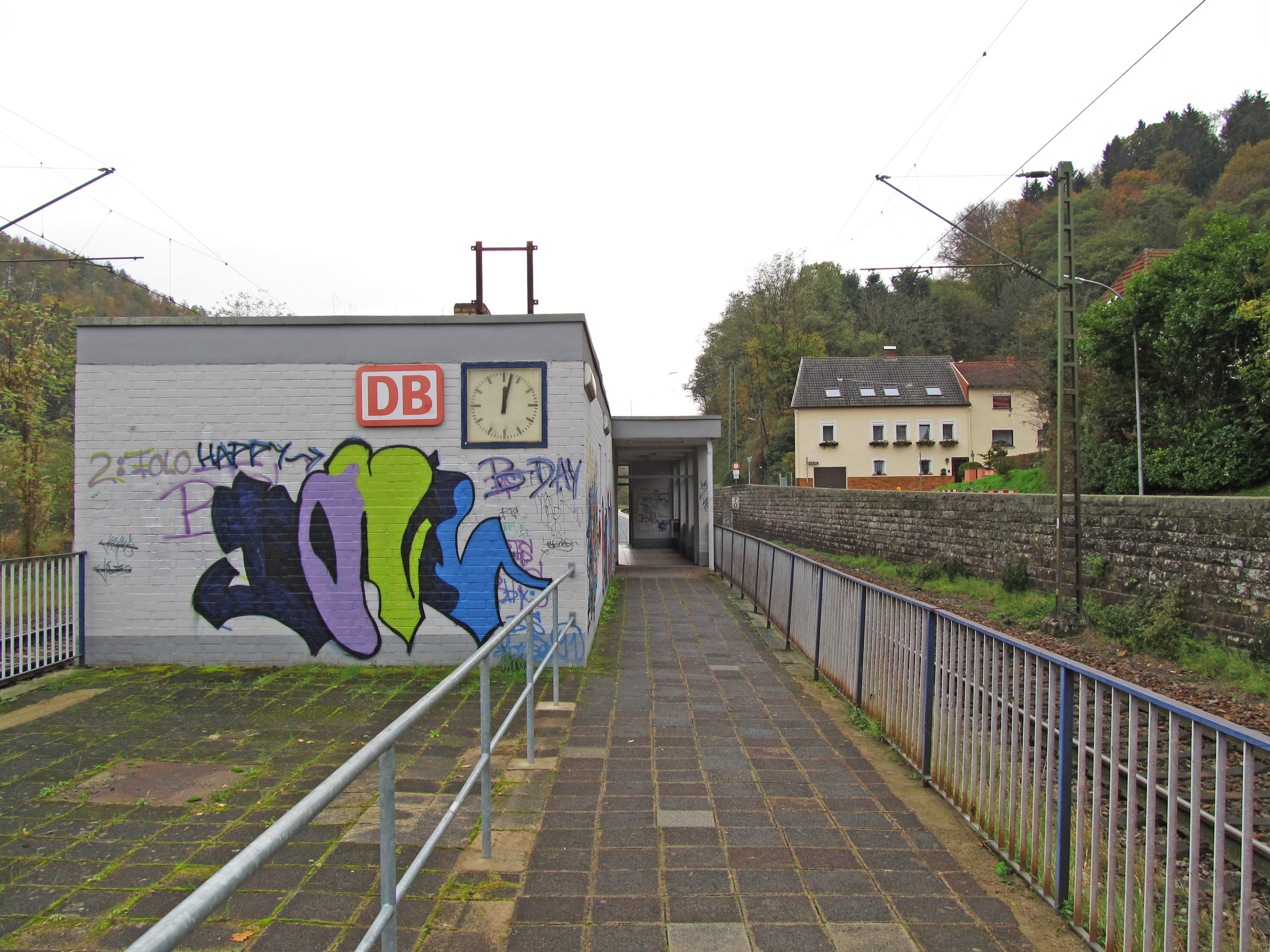
Scheidt (Saar) station

The halt of Scheidt (Saar) is located centrally within the Scheidt district of Saarbrücken Scheidt and belongs to station category 6. It was created in 1879 with the opening of the St. Ingbert–Saarbrücken section of the line.

=== Schafbrücke ===
The station was originally called Bischmisheim. It was given its current name of Schafbrücke after the district of Schafbrücke was created in its present form. A connecting line, which was built for strategic reasons, branched from it to the railway line at Brebach on the Saarbrücken–Sarreguemines railway. It belongs to station category 6.

=== Saarbrücken Ost ===
The halt of Saarbrücken Ost (east) is primarily used by the Saarbrücken districts of Rotenbühl, Kaninchenberg, Sankt Arnual and Eschberg. It was created after the Second World War and belongs to station category 5. The railway to Sarreguemines branches off here.

=== Saarbrücken Hauptbahnhof ===
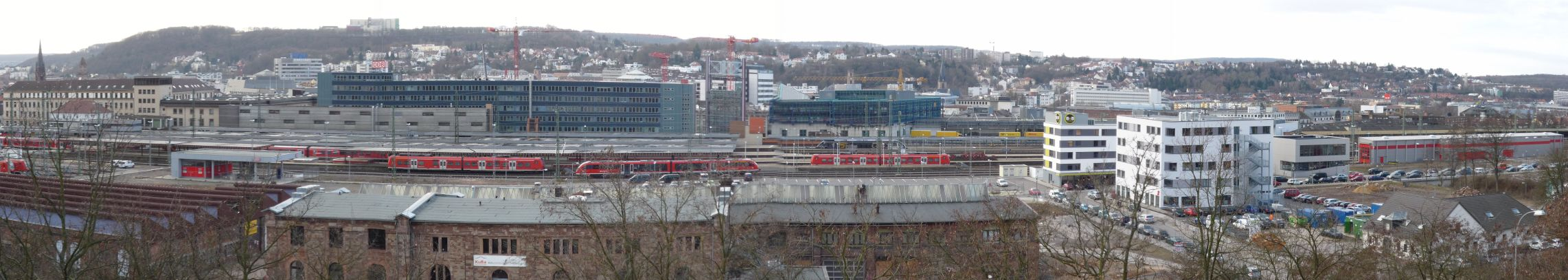
Saarbrücken Hauptbahnhof

Saarbrücken Hauptbahnhof has existed since 1852 and was initially called St. Johann-Saarbrücken. It was then the western terminus of the Ludwigshafen – Homburg – Neunkirchen – Saarbrücken main line. It is now the most important station in Saarland. It is the terminus of several other railway lines such as the Fischbach Valley Railway, the Nahe Valley Railway, the Saar Railway and the Saarbrücken–Sarreguemines railway. The original entrance building was located between the tracks. DB demolished it in 1960 and replaced it with a new one.
