= Annweiler am Trifels station =

Railway station in Germany

Annweiler am Trifels
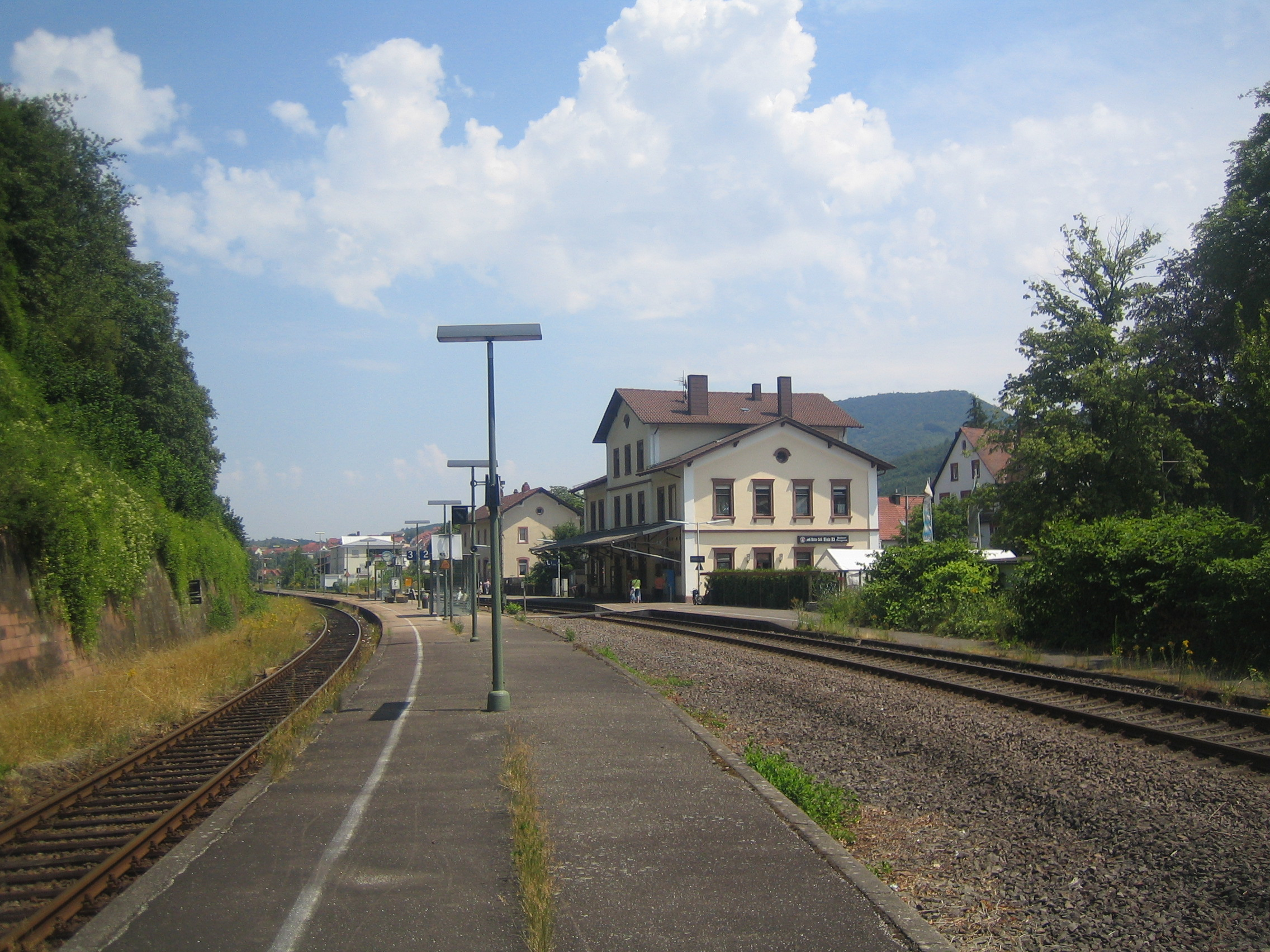
- Tracks and platforms

General information
- Location: Bahnhofstr. 17, Annweiler am Trifels, Rhineland-Palatinate; Germany
- Coordinates: 49°12′19″N 7°57′58″E
- Elevation: 182 m (597 ft)
- Owner: Deutsche Bahn
- Operator: DB Netz; DB Station&Service
- Line: Landau–Rohrbach (km 39.5)
- Platforms: 3

Construction
- Accessible: Yes
- Architectural style: Neoclassical

Other information
- Station code: 158
- DS100 code: RAN
- IBNR: 8000582
- Category: 5
- Fare zone: VRN: 181 and 191; KVV: 581 and 591 (VRN transitional tariff)
- Website: www.bahnhof.de

History
- Opened: 12 September 1874

Services
Preceding station	DB Regio Mitte	Following station
Annweiler-Sarnstal towards Pirmasens Hbf	RB 55	Albersweiler (Pfalz) towards Landau (Pfalz) Hbf
Location

Annweiler am Trifels station is the main station in the town of Annweiler am Trifels in the German state of Rhineland-Palatinate. Deutsche Bahn classifies it as a category 5 station and it has three platform tracks. The station is located in the network of the Verkehrsverbund Rhein-Neckar (Rhine-Neckar transport association, VRN) and belongs to fare zones 181 and 191. Since 2002, Annweiler has also been part of the area served by the Karlsruher Verkehrsverbund (Karlsruhe Transport Association, KVV) using tickets at a transitional rate. Annweiler was always the most important station between Landau (Pfalz) Hbf and Pirmasens Nord and it used to be served by long-distance services.

It was opened on 12 September 1874, when the first section of the line from Landau went into operation. 14 months later, it was connected with Zweibrücken and became a through station. This developed into the modern Landau–Rohrbach railway, which has existed in its present form since 1895.

== Location ==
The station is located on the northern outskirts of Annweiler. The Großer Adelberg (hill) is directly north of it, which required a retaining wall to be built. A residential area is located northeast of it on the slope. South of the railway station parallel to the tracks are Bahnhofstraße (station street) and the Queich. The western end of the station is covered by a stone arch bridge, which serves road traffic. The Landau–Rohrbach railway, which is very curvy in the built-up area of the town, comes from the north-east and continues to the west from the station; it follows the Queich until shortly before Hauenstein.

== History ==
A meeting took place in Speyer on 10 January 1838, which marked the beginning of selling shares in the Palatine Ludwig Railway Company (Pfälzische Ludwigsbahn-Gesellschaft). One suggestion was to build the railway through Zweibrücken and from there along the Schwarzbach via Rodalben, Annweiler and Langenkandel to the Rhine, but this was not adopted.

However, plans existed for the building of a line from Landau to Zweibrücken. Annweiler and the other places in the Queich valley would be the main beneficiaries. Annweiler, in particular, would benefit from a railway connection to its industrial settlements and villages between Landau and Annweiler would also benefit. In spite of the resistance of the administration of the Palatine Railway, which feared a weakening of the Ludwig Railway, they did not give up, persistently advocating the construction of such a connection. A planning committee considered, as an alternative, the establishment of a branch line from Landau to Annweiler. However, the committee changed its mind under pressure from the town of Landau and also agreed to support the construction of a Landau–Zweibrücken line. This time the efforts were successful: the committee was given the right to draft a suitable plan, which, however, it had to finance itself. The necessary concession was granted on 1 April 1865. The Annweiler-based industry, which produced straw hats and paper among other things, also supported a route along the Queich, after a route through the Wasgau via Bergzabern and Dahn was also considered.

The Annweiler am Trifels station was opened with the commissioning of the Landau (Pfalz)–Annweiler am Trifels section on 12 September 1874. A festival was held in the town on this occasion. At the station there were many celebrations and a total of 300 people travelled on the first train. In addition, the mayor made a speech. Afterwards, a pageant was held, led by the chapel of the 25th Rhenish Infantry Regiment from Strasbourg.

=== Further development ===
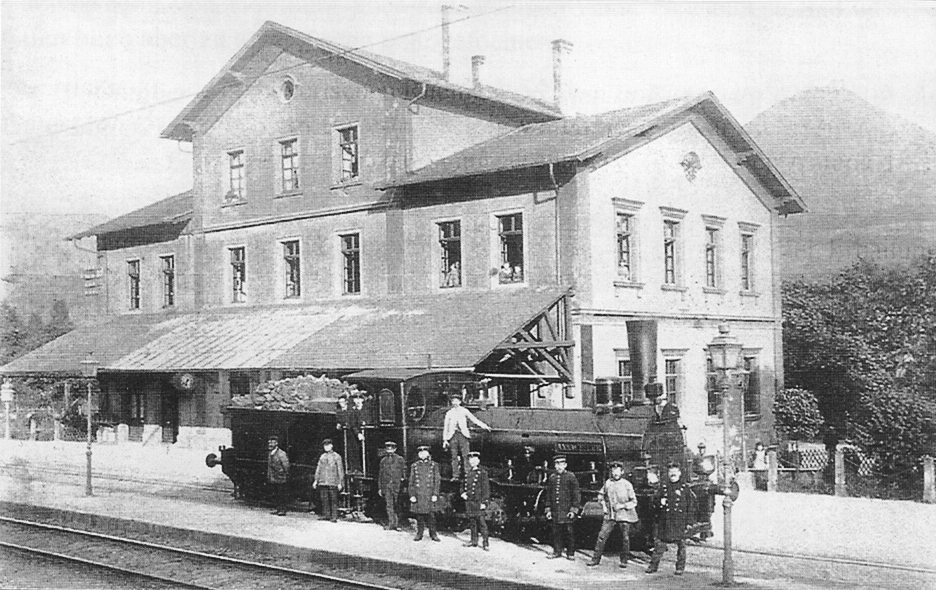
Steam locomotive of Palatine class G 2.I in the station at the beginning of the 20th century

For the first 14 months of its existence it was the terminus of the line, until it was extended to Zweibrücken on 25 November 1875. At the beginning of the twentieth century, the station had ticket gates like other stations in the Palatinate. During this time, the railway station was managed by the Zweibrücken operations and construction inspectorate and its tracks were part of the responsibility of the Bahnmeisterei (track master's office) of Albersweiler-St. Johann. After Germany lost the First World War and the French military invaded, the Palatine network south of Maikammer-Kirrweiler was blockaded to passenger traffic on 1 December 1918, but released for operations three days later. The line and Annweiler station became part of the area of the Reichsbahndirektion (Reichsbahn railway division) of Ludwigshafen after the founding of the Deutsche Reichsbahn in 1922. A year later, the railway workers employed at the railway station were expelled during the operation of the railway by the French military during the occupation of the Palatinate by France. They then returned to work. During the dissolution of the railway division of Ludwigshafen, responsibility for it was transferred to the railway division of Saarbrücken on 1 May 1936 and the Betriebsamtes (RBA) Zweibrücken (operations office of Zweibrücken).

Deutsche Bundesbahn (DB), which was responsible for railway operations from 1949, assigned the station to the railway division of Mainz, which was responsible for all railway lines within the newly created state of Rhineland-Palatinate. In the course of the staged dissolution of the railway division of Mainz from 1 August 1971, its counterpart in Saarbrücken took responsibility for the station. At the same time the platforms were raised. In 1996, the station became part of the area where services are organised by the Verkehrsverbund Rhein-Neckar (Rhine-Neckar transport association, VRN). Since 2002, the tickets of the Karlsruher Verkehrsverbund (Karlsruhe Transport Association, KVV) have also been recognised. DB Station&Service commissioned a passenger information display at the station on 1 January 2009. In 2014, the platforms were to be upgraded for disabled people.

== Infrastructure ==
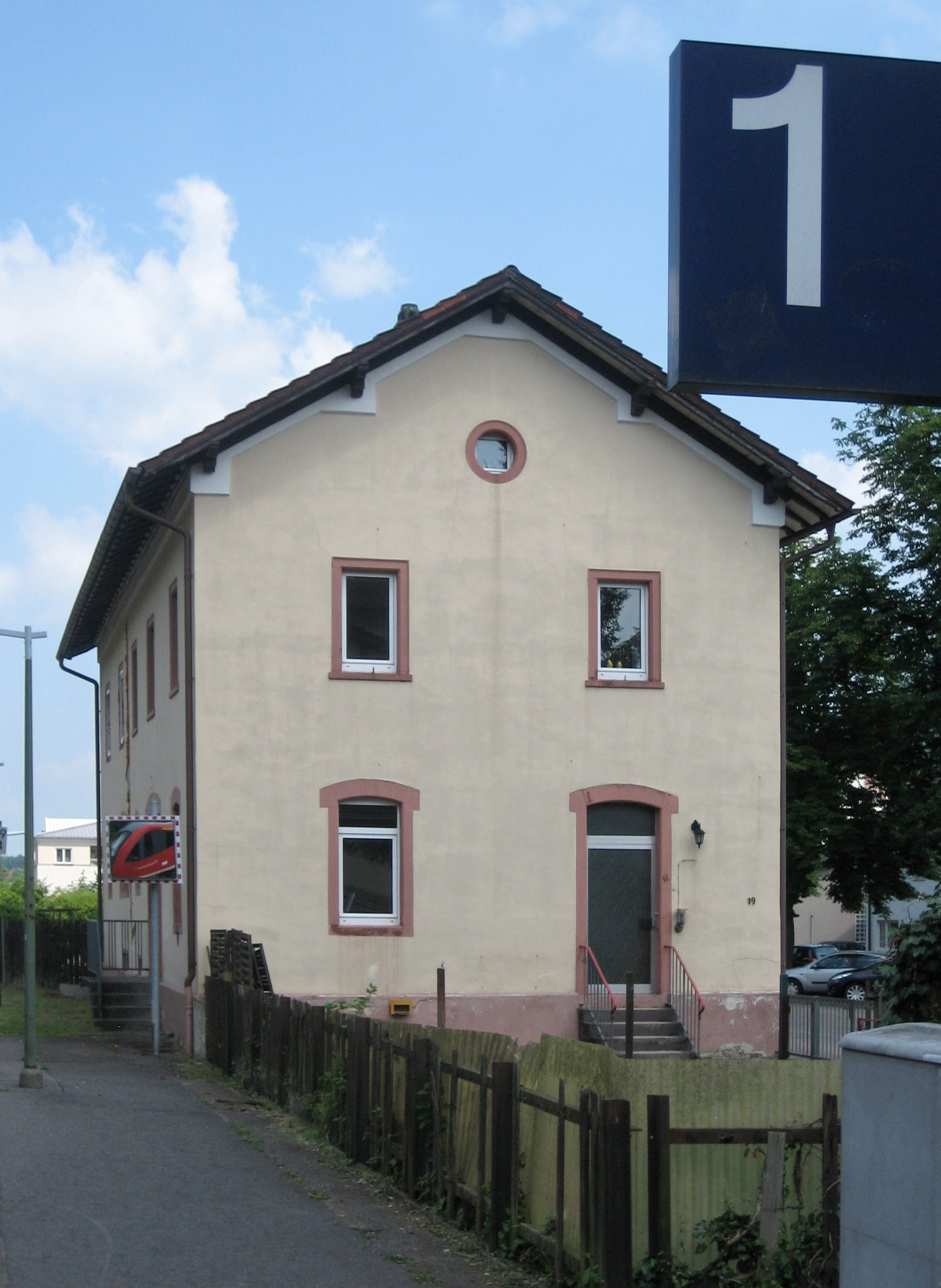
Former auxiliary building

=== Entrance building ===
The entrance building was built in the neoclassical style for the commissioning of the station in 1874. It is protected under the Rhineland Palatinate Conservation Act. In its execution it was almost identical with its original counterpart at Biebermühle station (now Pirmasens Nord station). The front-gabled central section of the building has three floors. Two two-storey wings are attached to it. The platform canopy was completed a few years after the station was opened. Similar buildings were found on the lines of the Palatinate Railways (Pfälzische Eisenbahnen) as well as the stations of Enkenbach, Kirchheimbolanden, Langmeil and Marnheim.

=== Other buildings ===
In addition, a two-storey secondary building, which was used for handling freight and has now been converted into a residence, was located in the western area of the station. It is also characteristic of the Palatinate Railways. A relatively large goods shed, which was built in the 1930s, was demolished in September 2013. In the eastern part of the station there is a signal box, which was also built in the 1930s. Red sandstone from the region was used for its lower floor.

=== Facilities ===
The station has three platforms for passenger services, including a dead-end platform which was restored in about 1990.

Platforms
Platform	Usable length	Platform height	Current use
1	226 m	34 cm	Regionalbahn services towards Pirmasens Hauptbahnhof
2	351 m	38 cm	Dead-end platform; rarely used
3	351 m	38 cm	Regionalbahn services towards Landau (Pfalz) Hauptbahnhof

== Operations ==
=== Passenger services ===
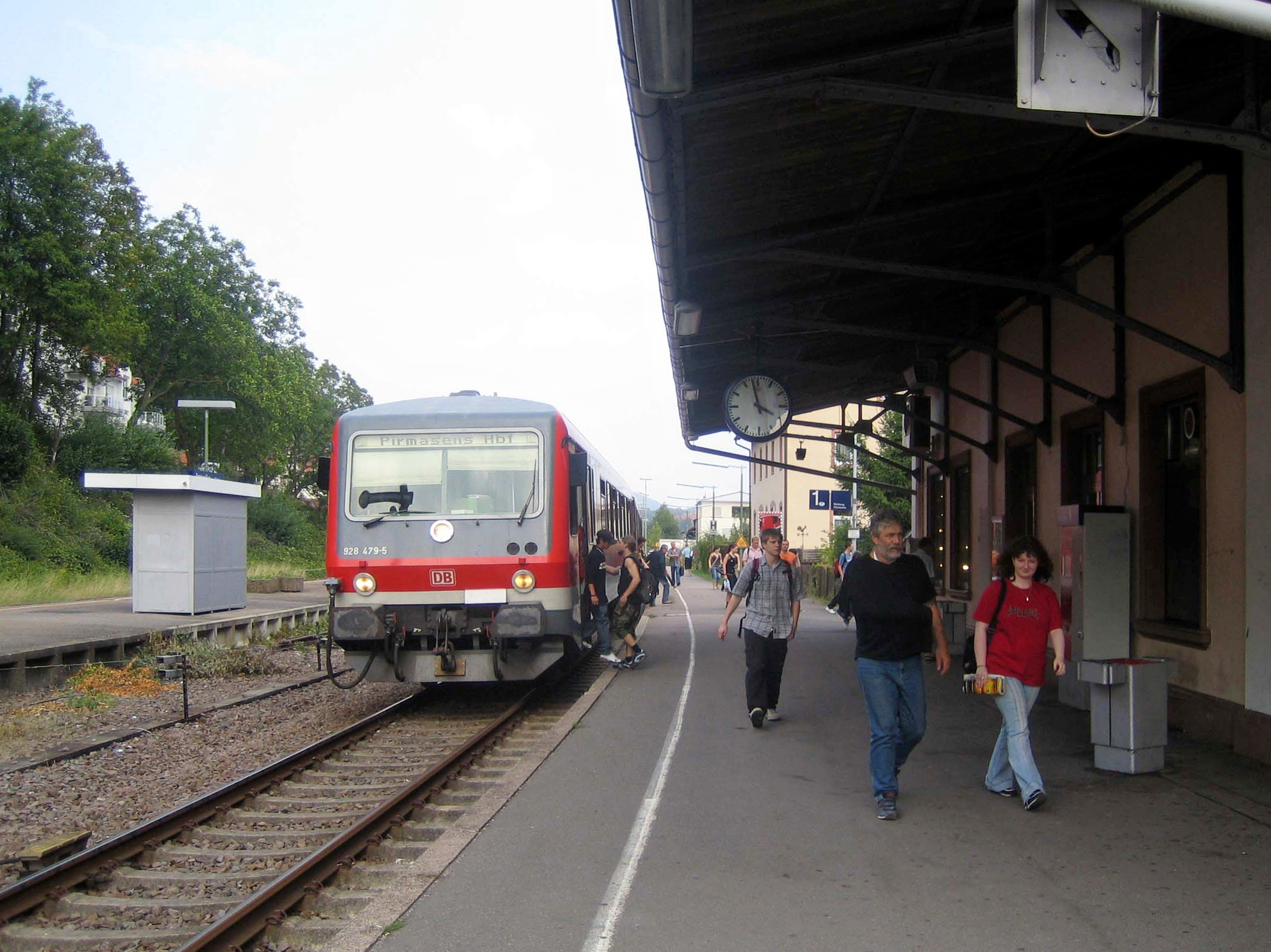
Train to Pirmasens in the station in September 2005

The Landau–Zweibrücken railway formed the continuation of the Germersheim–Landau railway and the Bruhrain Railway (Bruchsal–Germersheim), which is evident in the continuous chainage (kilometre markings). This starts in the middle of the Rhine Bridge, Germersheim. In the 1897 timetable, for example, thorough journeys from Zweibrücken via Annweiler and Landau to Germersheim are listed. At the end of the 1930s, there were continuous passenger services from Saarbrücken to Germersheim and Bruchsal. From 1938, it ran to the east towards Winden, Wörth and Karlsruhe; this continued in the Second World War.

Annweiler was regularly the terminus of trains that started in Landau. At the same time, trains ran to Pirmasenser Hauptbahnhof and Zweibrücken. In the 1970s, there were some through trains to Homburg, Neustadt, St. Ingbert and Bruchsal. In 1994, most of the services ran to Zweibrücken or Saarbrücken, since then traffic has been concentrated on Pirmasens. The last through train to Saarbrücken was abandoned in 2008. Two years later, connections had been established between Karlsruhe and Annweiler that ran over the Neustadt–Wissembourg railway and the Winden–Karlsruhe railway. From May to October, Felsenland-Express excursion services run on Wednesdays, Saturdays, Sundays and public holidays from Neustadt and Karlsruhe, stopping in Annweiler.

Train connections in the 2021 time table
Line	Route	Interval
RB 55	Landau (Pfalz) – Godramstein – Annweiler am Trifels – Wilgartswiesen – Hinterweidenthal Ost – Münchweiler (Rodalb) – Pirmasens Nord – Pirmasens Hbf	Hourly with additional services between Landau and Annweiler in the peak
RB 55; Felsenland-Express	Neustadt (Weinstr) – Landau (Pfalz) – Godramstein – Annweiler am Trifels – Wilgartswiesen – Hinterweidenthal Ost – Münchweiler (Rodalb) – Pirmasens Nord – Pirmasens Hbf / Hinterweidenthal Ort – Dahn – Bundenthal-Rumbach	Individual services on Wednesdays, Sundays and public holidays
RB 56; Felsenland-Express	Karlsruhe – Wörth (Rhein) – Winden (Pfalz) – Landau (Pfalz) – Annweiler am Trifels – Wilgartswiesen – Hinterweidenthal Ost – Hinterweidenthal Ort – Dahn – Bundenthal-Rumbach	Individual services on Saturdays, Sundays and public holidays

=== Freight operations ===
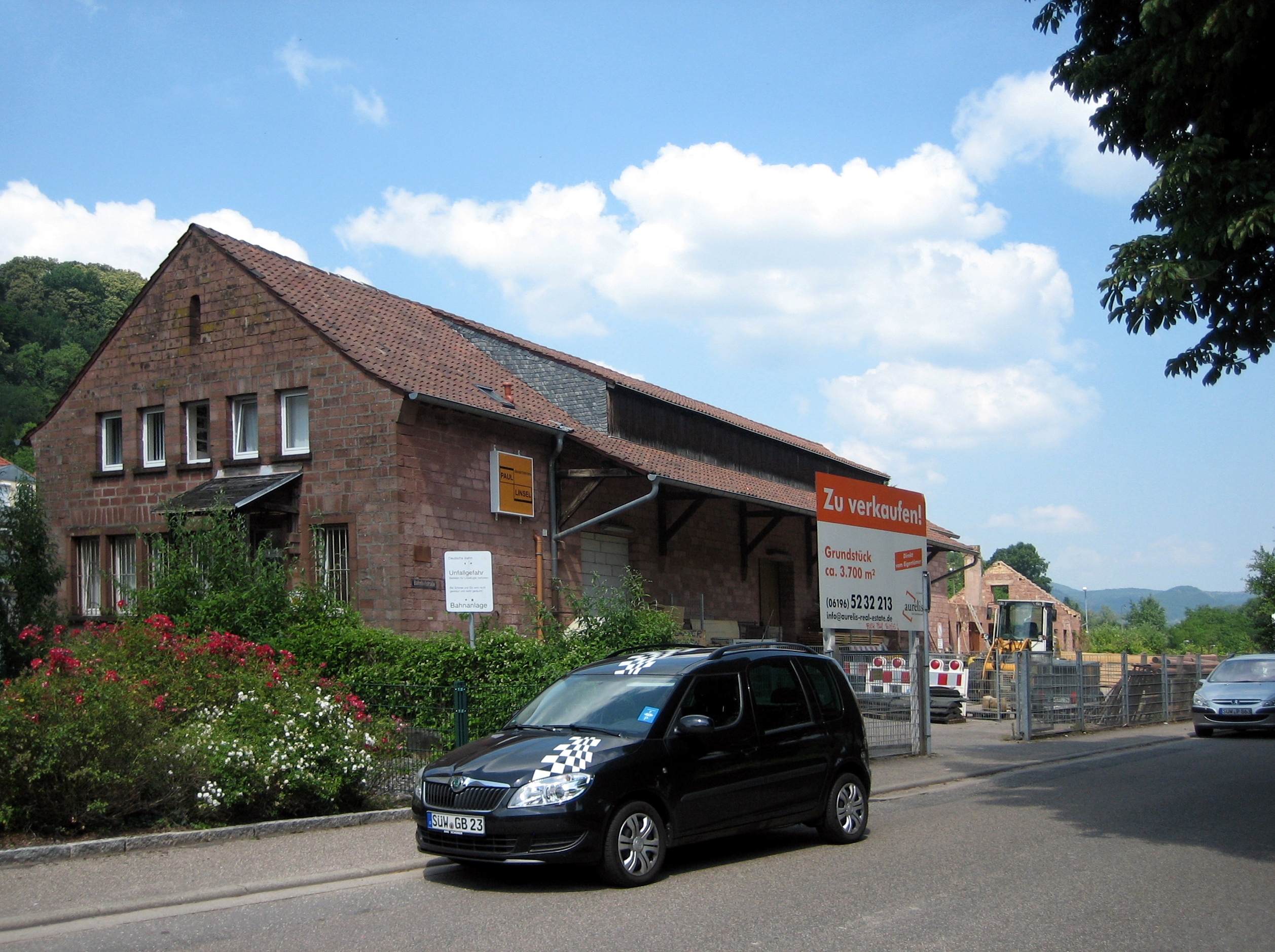
Former goods shed

At the beginning of the twentieth century, freight trains operated over the Kaiserslautern–Homburg–Landau–Germersheim and Saarbrücken–Landau–Germersheim lines. Their customers at the station included Stabila, a local manufacturer of measuring instruments. After the Second World War freight traffic also lost importance. From the 1980s onwards, a Übergabegüterzug (goods exchange train) served the station. Its operation were based in Neustadt Hauptbahnhof. The trains ran from Landau to Wilgartswiesen. Operation of freight traffic at the station ended in 1994. Subsequently, the loading tracks at the station were disconnected and partially dismantled in 2001. Subsequently, the loading tracks in the station were disconnected and partially dismantled in 2001. It had already lost all freight traffic a few years earlier.

=== Bus services ===
There is a bus stop in the station forecourt (Bahnhofsvorplatz). Since 2012, Queichtal Nahverkehrsgesellschaft GmbH has been responsible for operating the bus routes, which were reorganised in the same year.

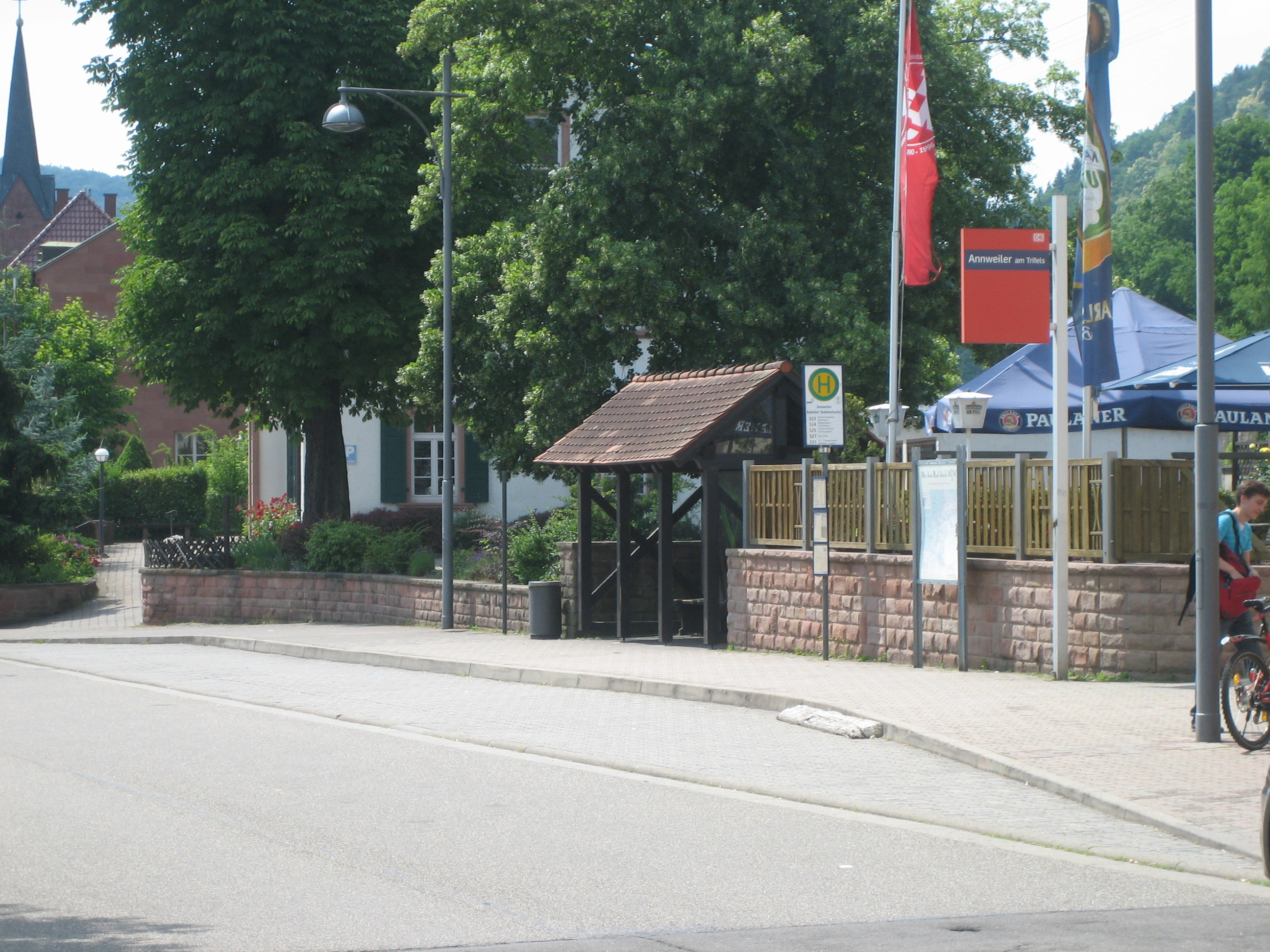
Bus stop in the station forecourt

Currently, the station is served by the following bus routes:

- 522: Ramberg/Siebeldingen – Queichhambach – Annweiler (only for school traffic)
- 523: Albersweiler – Queichhambach – Gräfenhausen – Annweiler – Bindersbach
- 524: Albersweiler – Queichhambach – Gräfenhausen – Annweiler – Waldrohrbach – Waldhambach – Pfalzklinikum
- 525: Bad Bergzabern – Birkenhördt – Erlenbach bei Dahn – Vorderweidenthal – Oberschlettenbach – Darstein – Schwanheim – Dimbach – Lug – Spirkelbach – Wernersberg – Annweiler
- 526: Annweiler – Sarnstall – Hofstätten/Wilgartswiesen – Hauenstein
- 531: Landau – Arzheim – Ilbesheim – Eschbach – Klingenmünster – Münchweiler am Klingbach – Silz – Gossersweiler-Stein – Völkersweiler – Annweiler
- 532: Forsthaus Taubensuhl – Eußerthal – Albersweiler – Annweiler – Völkersweiler – Gossersweiler-Stein – Silz – Vorderweidenthal – Oberschlettenbach – Darstein – Schwanheim – Dimbach – Lug – Spirkelbach – Wernersberg – Annweiler

== Sources ==
=== References ===
- Heilmann, Michael; Schreiner, Werner (2005). 150 Jahre Maximiliansbahn Neustadt-Straßburg [150 Years of the Maximilian Railway: Neustadt–Strasbourg] (in German). Ludwigshafen am Rhein: pro MESSAGE. ISBN 3-934845-27-4.
- Holzborn, Klaus D. (1993). Eisenbahn-Reviere Pfalz [Palatine railway station districts] (in German). Berlin: transpress. ISBN 3-344-70790-6.
- Mühl, Albert (1982). Die Pfalzbahn. Geschichte, Betrieb und Fahrzeuge der Pfälzischen Eisenbahnen [The Palatine Railway. History, Operations and Rollingstock of the Palatine Railways] (in German). Stuttgart: Theiss Verlag. ISBN 3-8062-0301-6.
- Preuß, Erich (1996). Stellwerke deutscher Eisenbahnen [Signal boxes of the German railways] (in German). Stuttgart: Transpress. ISBN 978-3-613714-45-8.
- Schreiner, Werner (2010). Paul Camille von Denis: Europäischer Verkehrspionier und Erbauer der pfälzischen Eisenbahnen [Paul Camille von Denis: European Transport Pioneer and Builder of the Palatine Railways] (in German). Ludwigshafen am Rhein: pro MESSAGE. ISBN 978-3-934845-49-7.
- Sturm, Heinz (2005). Die pfälzischen Eisenbahnen [The Palatine Railways] (in German). Ludwigshafen am Rhein: pro MESSAGE. ISBN 3-934845-26-6.
- Sturm, Heinz (1980). Geschichte der Maxbahn 1855–1945 [125 years of the Maximilian Railway Neustadt/Weinstr.-Landau/Pfalz] (in German). Modell- und Eisenbahnclub Landau in der Pfalz e. V.
- Wenz, Martin (2008). Typenbahnhöfe der Pfälzischen Eisenbahnen an der Südlichen Weinstraße [Standard Railway Stations of the Palatine Railways on the Southern Wine Route] (in German). Landkreis Südliche Weinstraße.
- Eisenbahnatlas Deutschland [German railway atlas]. Schweers + Wall. 2017. ISBN 978-3-89494-146-8.
