= Rohrbach (Saar) station =

Railway station in Sankt Ingbert, Germany

Rohrbach (Saar)
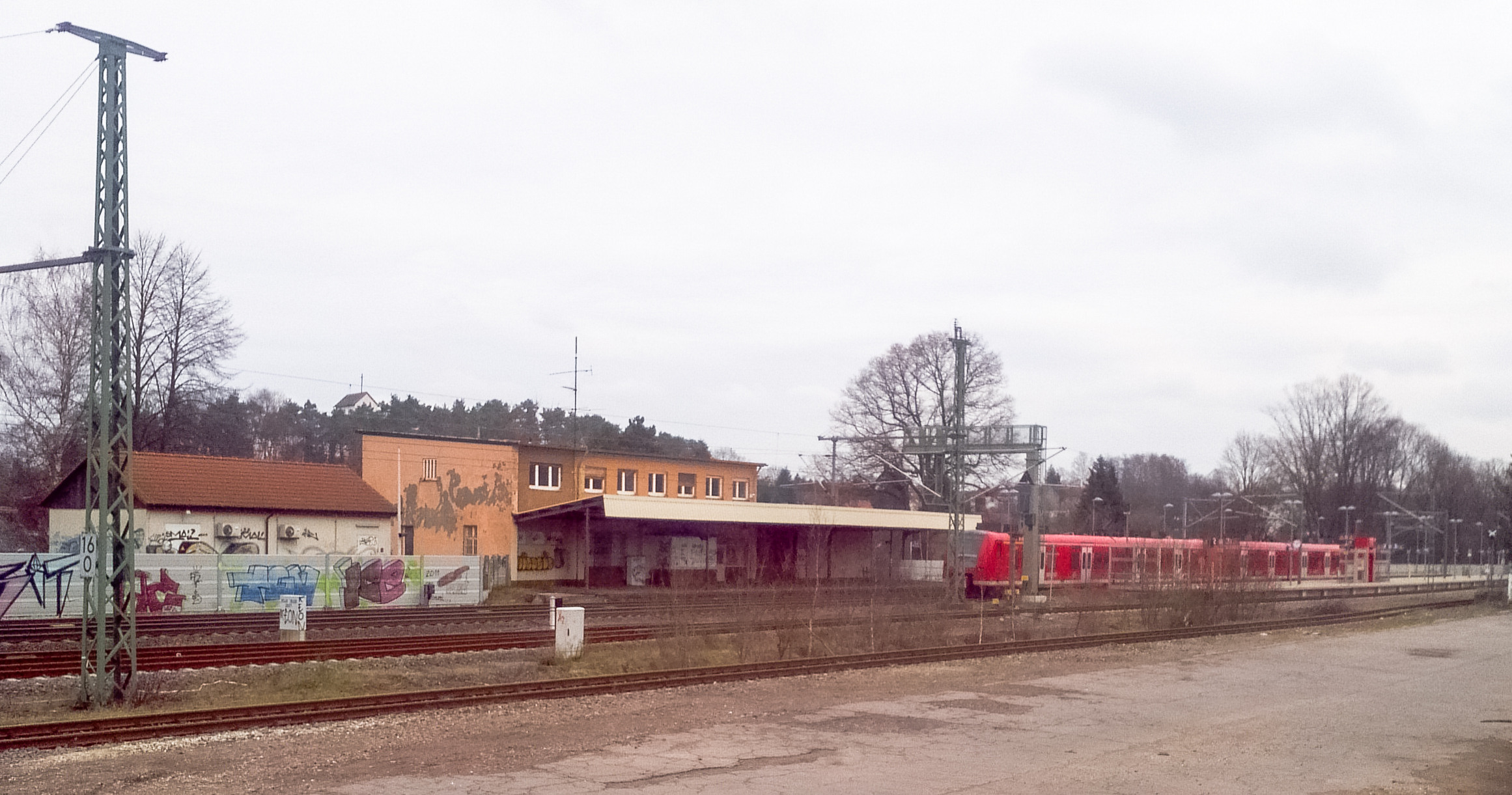
- Rohrbach station, looking north; train on platform 2

General information
- Location: Bahnhofstr. 96, Rohrbach (Saar), Sankt Ingbert, Saarland; Germany
- Coordinates: 49°16′37″N 7°09′25″E
- Lines: Palatine Ludwig Railway (KBS 670); Pirmasens–Saarbrücken (KBS 674)
- Platforms: 3

Construction
- Accessible: Platform 1 only

Other information
- Station code: 5319
- DS100 code: SRO
- IBNR: 8000319
- Category: 5
- Fare zone: SaarVV: 572
- Website: www.bahnhof.de

History
- Opened: September 1895

Services
Preceding station	DB Regio Mitte	Following station
Sankt Ingbert towards Saarbrücken Hbf	RB 68	Hassel (Saar) towards Pirmasens Hbf
Sankt Ingbert towards Merzig (Saar)	RB 70	Kirkel towards Kaiserslautern Hbf
Sankt Ingbert towards Schweich DB	RB 71	Kirkel towards Kaiserslautern Hbf
Location

Rohrbach (Saar) station is a station in the district of Rohrbach of Sankt Ingbert in the German state of Saarland.

== History ==
The station was opened on 1 September 1895 with the building of the line to bypass the Hasseler Tunnel. Its importance increased with the opening on 1 May 1904 of the Glan Valley Railway (German: Glantalbahn) strategic railway, linking Munster am Stein and Homburg, along with a new section of the Palatine Ludwig Railway between Homburg to Rohrbach, which was opened on 1 January 1904. Extensive modifications to the station building were made in 1958. In preparation for the operation of the ICE 3 train service between Mannheim and Paris in 2008, the western exit curve was eased and the station platform was raised and moved about 50 metres further east. The station building was closed after a long period when no ticket had been sold there.

Until the closure of numerous factories along the railway line in Rohrbach, there was a freight yard and a number of factory sidings, the last of which was closed in 2008. In addition to the three passenger platform tracks, there is also a siding.

== Infrastructure ==
In the area of the station there are no services apart from ticket machines. The railway line, which runs approximately east-west, has a pedestrian tunnel under it, but the connection to the platform is provided by a separate tunnel, which, however, connects only towards the centre of the town, which is to the north, so rail passengers exiting to the south must cross the tracks and climb steps twice.

== Rail services ==
Rohrbach station is served by the following lines (as of 2025):

Line	Route	Frequency
RB 68	Saarbrücken Hbf – St. Ingbert – Rohrbach (Saar) – Zweibrücken Hbf – Pirmasens Hbf (once each morning running to Landau (Pfalz) Hbf)	Hourly
RB 70	Saarbrücken Hbf – St. Ingbert – Rohrbach (Saar) – Homburg (Saar) Hbf – Kaiserslautern Hbf	60 min
RB 71	Trier Hbf – Dillingen (Saar) – Saarlouis Hbf – Saarbrücken Hbf – St. Ingbert – Rohrbach (Saar) – Homburg (Saar) Hbf	Hourly
