= Kirkel station =

Railway station in Kirkel, Germany

Kirkel
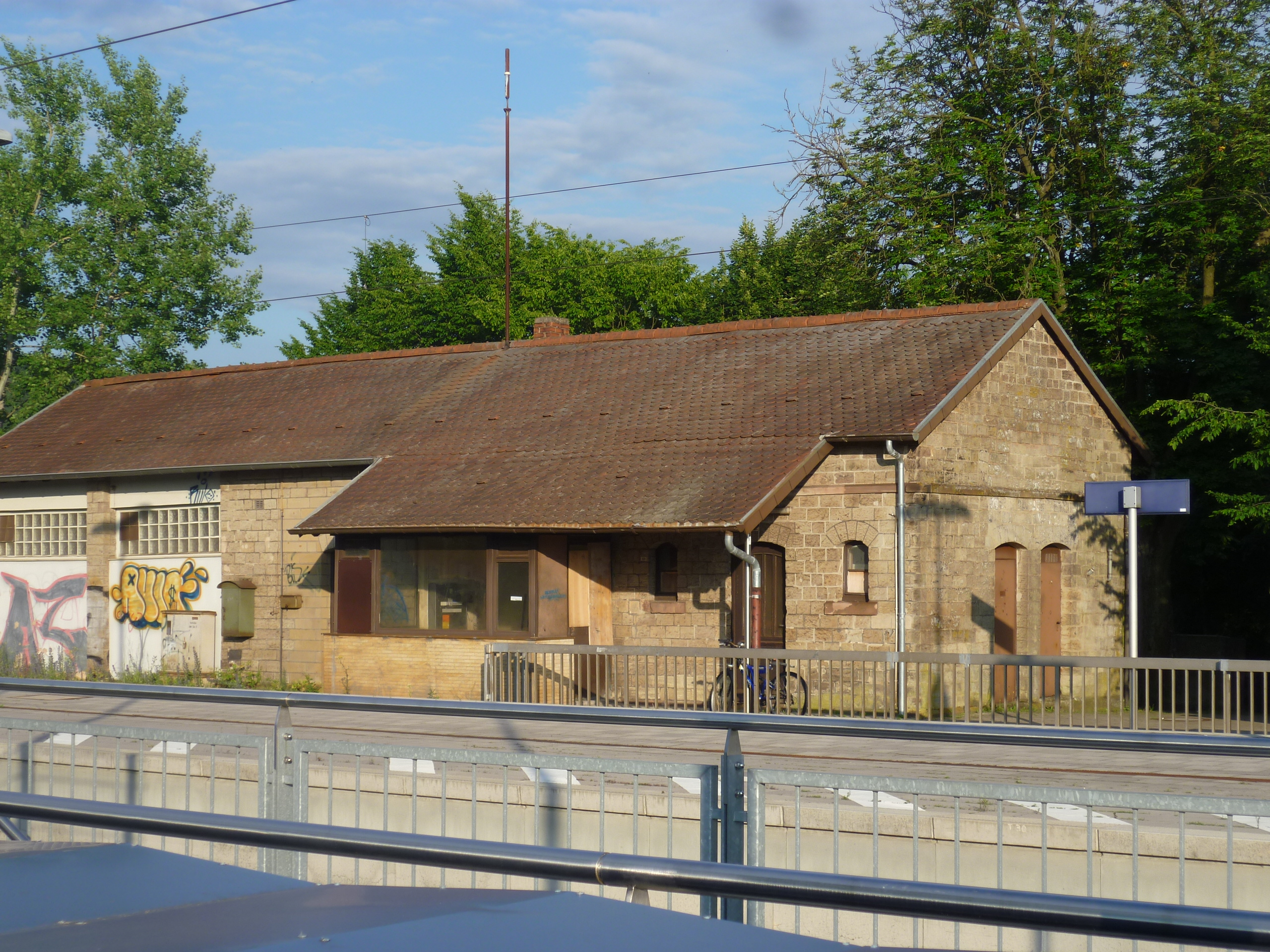
- Kirkel station in 2012

General information
- Location: Eisenbahnstr. 6, Kirkel, Saarland; Germany
- Coordinates: 49°17′10″N 7°13′35″E
- Lines: Mannheim–Saarbrücken (KBS 670)
- Platforms: 2

Construction
- Accessible: No

Other information
- Station code: 3207
- DS100 code: SKI
- IBNR: 8003294
- Category: 6
- Fare zone: SaarVV: 551
- Website: www.bahnhof.de

History
- Opened: 1 January 1904
Location

Kirkel station is a station located in Kirkel-Neuhäusel at kilometre 21.50 of the Mannheim–Saarbrücken railway in the German state of Saarland. Deutsche Bahn classified it as belonging to station category 6. The station is served hourly by Regionalbahn services RB70 and RB71. In addition, individual Regional-Express services on line RE1 (one of five services branded as Süwex—"south west express") stop. At the station there are Park&Ride parking spaces.

== History ==
The station was opened with the Homburg (Saar) – Rohrbach (Saar) section of the Palatine Ludwig Railway on 1 January 1904. This section became the busiest section of the Mannheim–Saarbrücken axis instead of the original Homburg–Neunkirchen section. The other lines around Homburg lost importance. Kirkel station had its greatest importance during this time.

On 12 and 13 March 1945, Kirkel was attacked by American bombers. Apart from the ammunition stores in the forest between Kirkel and Rohrbach, the railway line and the station were the main targets.

In 1973, the station had a low island platform (about 30 cm above the top of the rail) between the two tracks. It was reached via a pedestrian level crossing over the Homburg line, which was controlled by the driver. With an increase in traffic and through speeds, and in anticipation of the early relocation of the rail maintenance operations to Saarbrücken, a passenger subway was built in 1973 from the south side (the centre of the town). At the same time, the platform was raised to 76 cm above the top of the rail. The underpass was extended to the north side in 2008 to connect with a parking area that was built on the location on the site of a former siding.

A relay interlocking of Dr L2 type was located in the station building and controlled the station's two through tracks, as well as the two marshalling yards with a loading ramp north and south of the line. It was put into operation in 1956 and has been remotely-controlled from the Saarbrücken control centre since 1 September 1972. Operations were directed by an on-site dispatcher, who implemented the control commands sent from the control centre. The signal box was no longer occupied from 1 September 1982 and direct control of the signalling and points was assumed by the Saarbrücken centre. When the electronic interlocking in Saarbrücken was commissioned in October 1998, the relay interlocking was taken out of service. Since November 2003, the dispatcher responsible for local operations has been located in the Karlsruhe operations centre. The decommissioning of the signal box and the changeover to the electronic interlocking also resulted in the reclassification of the station from a full station (Bahnhof) to a halt (Haltepunkt). Until the beginning of the 1970s, the on-site dispatcher was responsible for ticket sales.

A part of the old freight hall has been used since 1999 by a classic car (German: Oldtimer) association.

In May 2008, the new Park&Ride car park was inaugurated. In order to increase the speed to 200 km/h, the trackwork and the substructure of the local section of the Mannheim–Saarbrücken railway were completely renovated. At the same time, the station subway was extended to the north side of the station to provide direct access to the Kirkel educational centre of the Arbeitskammer des Saarlandes (workers’ chamber of the Saarland) and to the newly established Park&Ride car park. The entire platform was renewed and noise walls were built on the side of the railway tracks. These works were completed with the renewal and raising of the platform in 2008 and 2009. The old walls were demolished and replaced by a glazed staircase.

== Rail services ==
The station is served by regional trains of the following services:

Line	Route	Interval
RB 70	Merzig (Saar) – Saarbrücken – St. Ingbert – Kirkel – Homburg (Saar) – Landstuhl – Kaiserslautern	Hourly
RB 71	Homburg (Saar) – Kirkel – St. Ingbert – Saarbrücken – Saarlouis – Merzig (Saar) – Saarburg (Bz Trier) – Trier	Hourly
RE 1	Mannheim – Kaiserslautern – Landstuhl – Homburg (Saar) – Kirkel – St. Ingbert – Saarbrücken – Saarlouis – Merzig (Saar) – Saarburg (Bz Trier) – Trier – Koblenz	Some services

There is a bus stop just 100 metres from the station. Bus route 547 of the Saarpfalz-Bus GmbH, which connects Kirkel with Neunkirchen and Blieskastel, stops here.
