= Großer Adelberg =

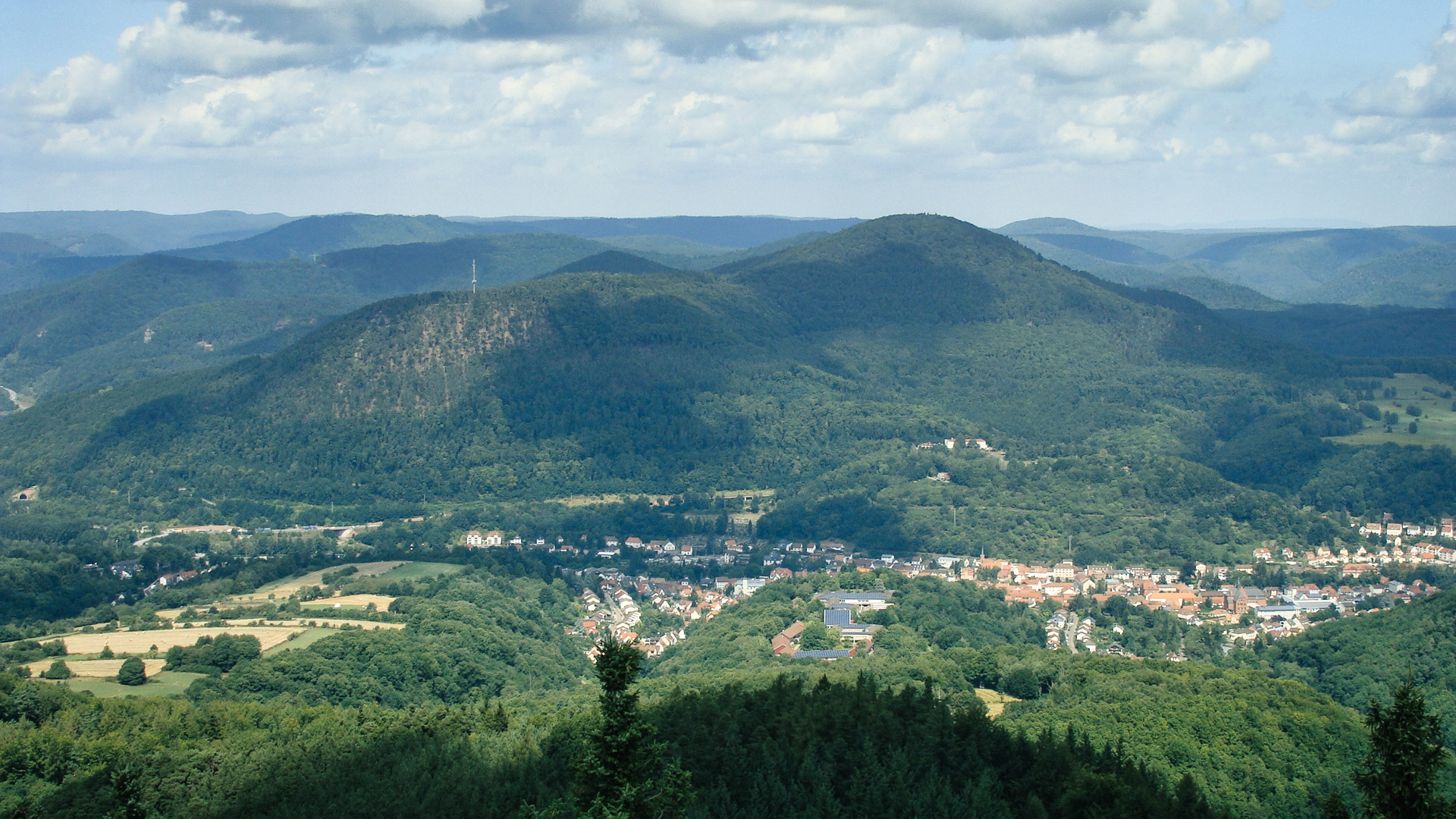
- The Kleiner and Großer Adelberg

Highest point
- Elevation: 567.4 m above sea level (NHN) (1,862 ft)
- Coordinates: 49°12′57″N 7°57′28″E

Geography
- Location within Rhineland-Palatinate
- Location: near Annweiler am Trifels; Südwestpfalz, Rhineland-Palatinate (Germany)
- Parent range: Central Palatine Forest (Palatine Forest)

Geology
- Mountain type: Rückenberg
- Rock type: Bunter sandstone

The Großer Adelberg is a hill, 567 metres high, in the Central Palatinate Forest in Germany.

== Location ==
The hill is located on the territory of the town of Annweiler am Trifels north of the main urban area. To the northeast is the village of Gräfenhausen. To the east is the Krappenfels rock formation and the Mittelberg hill. To the south-southwest lies the Kleine Adelberg.

== Access ==
To the south it is bounded by the B 10 and Landau–Rohrbach railway on which is Annweiler am Trifels station. Nearby are the Annweiler Youth Gymnastics Centre (Turnerjugendheim Annweiler) and a pumping station.
