= Pirmasens Nord station =

Railway station in Pirmasens, Germany

Pirmasens Nord
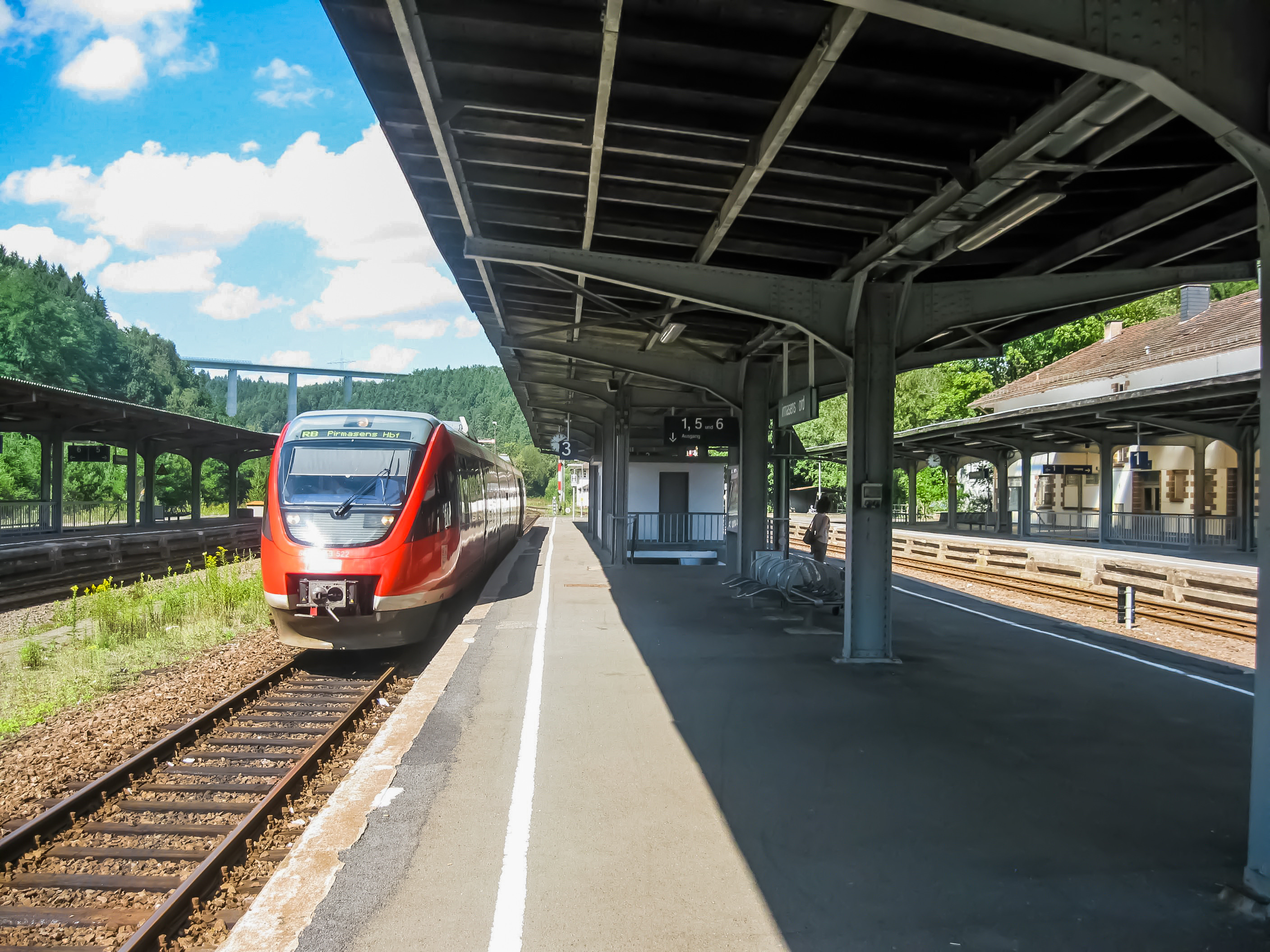
- 2010

General information
- Location: Thaleischweiler-Fröschen, Rhineland-Palatinate; Germany
- Coordinates: 49°15′30″N 7°36′16″E
- Owner: DB Netz
- Operator: DB Station&Service
- Lines: Biebermühl Railway (KBS 672); Pirmasens–Saarbrücken (KBS 674 and 675)
- Platforms: 2

Construction
- Accessible: No

Other information
- Station code: 4942
- DS100 code: SPSN
- IBNR: 8000876
- Category: 4
- Fare zone: VRN: 751
- Website: www.bahnhof.de

History
- Opened: 25 November 1875

Services
Preceding station	DB Regio Mitte	Following station
Pirmasens Hbf Terminus	RB 55	Rodalben towards Landau (Pfalz) Hbf
Pirmasens Hbf Terminus	RB 64	Waldfischbach towards Kaiserslautern Hbf
Thaleischweiler-Fröschen towards Saarbrücken Hbf	RB 68	Pirmasens Hbf Terminus
Location
- Location within Rhineland-Palatinate

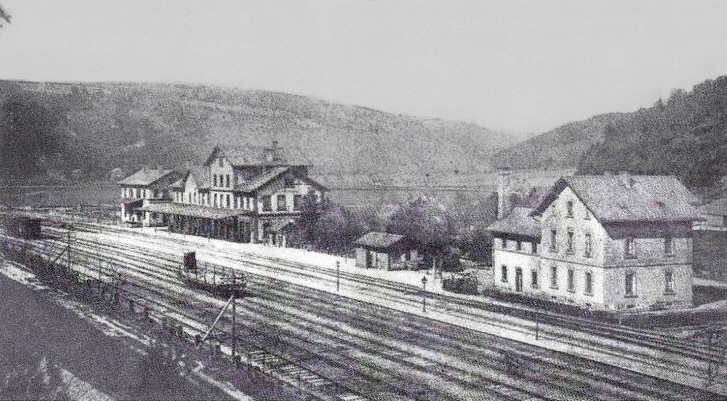
Pirmasens Nord station (then Biebermühle) in 1900

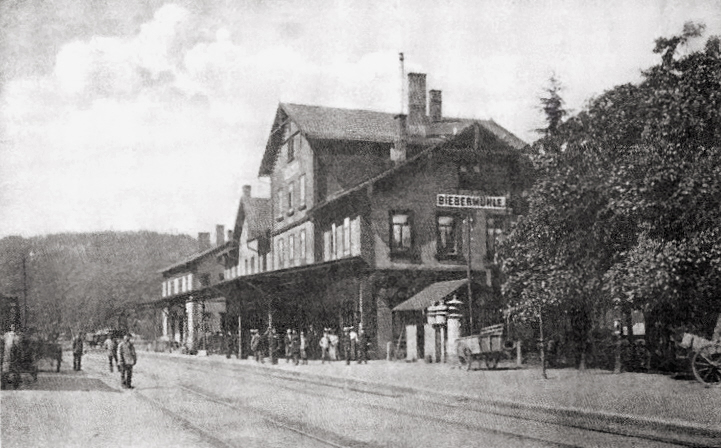
Station in 1912

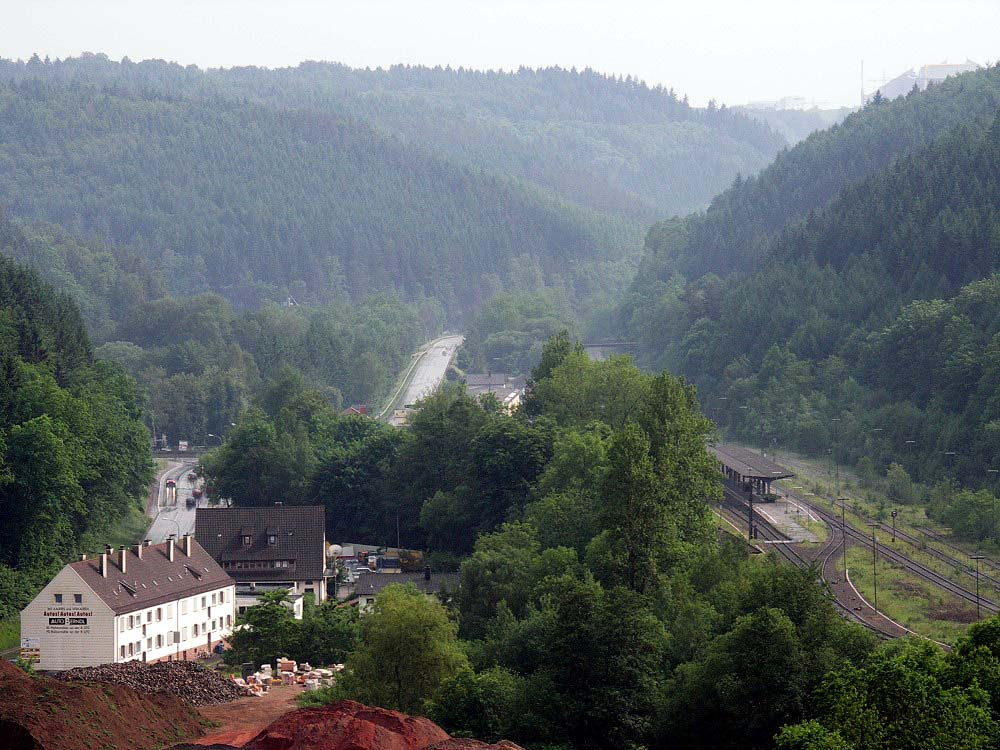
Pirmasens Nord (right) from the air, village of Biebermühle on the left

Pirmasens Nord (north) station is a station opened in 1875 seven kilometres north of Pirmasens in the municipality of Thaleischweiler-Fröschen in the German state of Rhineland-Palatinate. The station is located next to the hamlet of Biebermühle, which it was named after until 1936. It is the main station within the district of Südwestpfalz.

== History ==
During the planning of the Landau–Zweibrücken railway, it was found that building the line via Pirmasens would be difficult. The topography of Pirmasens meant that a station would have to be built far from the city centre and an elaborate tunnel under the city would have been necessary. It was decided to build the line to the north of Pirmasens along the Rodalb and Schwarzenbach rivers. A station was built near the hamlet of Biebermühle and at the same time a branch line was built to Pirmasens (the Biebermühl Railway, Biebermühlbahn).

=== Opening and first few decades ===
The station was established on 25 November 1875 with the commissioning of the Annweiler–Zweibrücken section of the Queich Valley Railway (Queichtalbahn). At the same time the branch line to Pirmasens was opened, making the station a railway junction. Its builder, the former Palatinate Railway (Pfalzbahn), was absorbed in 1909 into the Royal Bavarian State Railways (Königliche Bayerische Staats-Eisenbahnen). In 1905, a further branch line was opened to Waldfischbach and the station building became surrounded by rail tracks. In 1913 the station became more important as a junction, as the line to Waldfischbach had been extended to Kaiserslautern.

After operations of the station had been taken over by France as a result of the First World War, it was taken over in 1922 by Deutsche Reichsbahn. It belonged at first to the railway division of Ludwigshafen and in 1935 was transferred to the Saarbrücken railway division.

During the Third Reich the station was completely transformed. This included the building of a new station building.

=== Since the end of the Second World War ===
On 1 April 1947, the station came under the administration of the railway division of Mainz, since the Saar had been removed from Germany. From 1 May 1972 until the founding of Deutsche Bahn in 1994, the station was administered by the Deutsche Bundesbahn railway division in Saarbrücken.

The station was served not only by local trains but also by services on the Saarbrücken–Zweibrücken–Landau–Karlsruhe route.

In the 1970s and 1980s, the Saarbrücken–Munich express operated over the line. With the introduction of the summer timetable in May 1989, a forerunner of the modern Regional-Express services called a RegionalSchnellBahn ran on the Saarbrücken–Pirmasens Nord–Landau–Karlsruhe route using new class 628.2 diesel multiple units. In the summer of 1994 timetable this service was abandoned and the current Regionalbahn service was introduced.

Today the station serves as a junction between the railway lines from Saarbrücken, Landau and Kaiserslautern, all starting or ending at Pirmasens.

Until 2002, Regional-Express service RE 4, running from Pirmasens Central Station via Kaiserslautern to Bingen stopped at the station. The train ran over the Alsenz Valley Railway (Alsenztalbahn). Since then, however, trains run only as far as Kaiserslautern, where it is necessary to change trains to travel to Bad Kreuznach and Bingen.

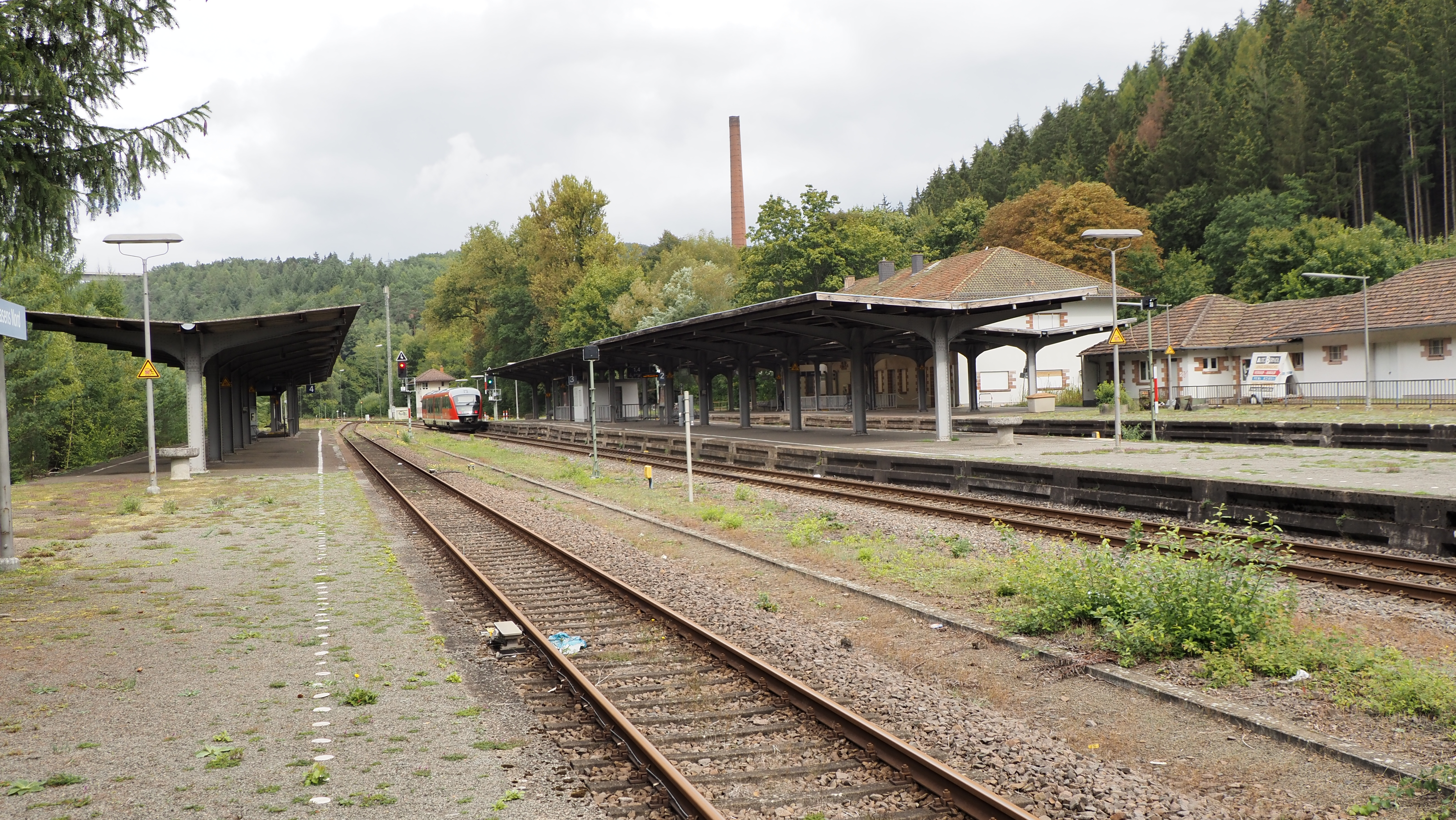
Pirmasens Nord, september 2022

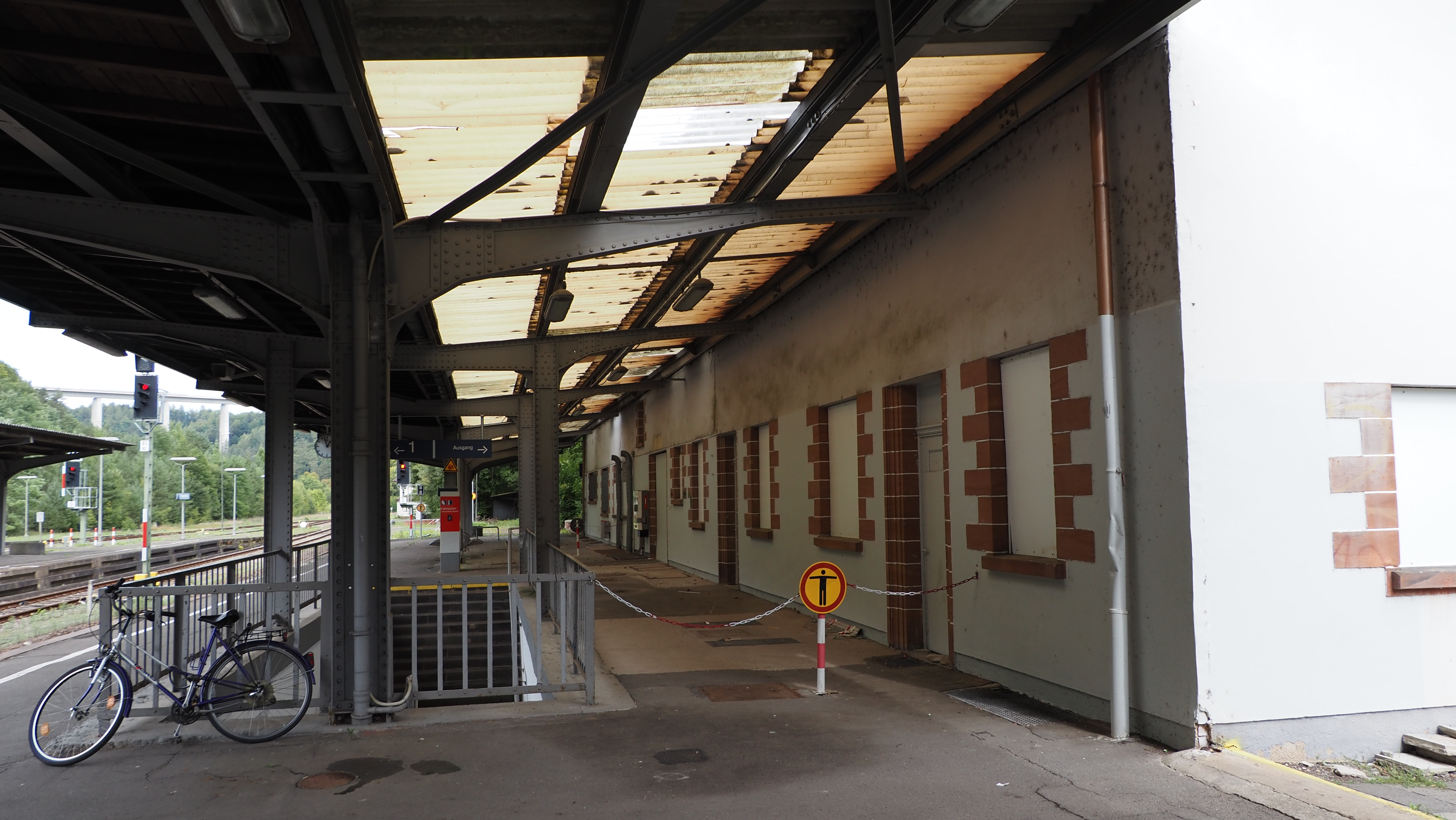
Pirmasens Nord, closed station building, 09.2022

== Infrastructure ==
The current station building was built in 1834 and has a cubic shape. It is a stucco building. The locomotive and goods shed still exist, but neither is used for railway operations. The modernisation of the platforms is scheduled in the near future.

The station building possessed a restaurant at times, a ticket hall and toilets before it was taken out of service for rail operations. Today, its entrances and exits are covered with sheets of plywood.

== Rail services ==
Pirmasens Nord station is served by the following lines:

Line	Route	Frequency
RB 55	Pirmasens – Pirmasens Nord – Landau	Hourly
RB 64	Pirmasens – Pirmasens Nord – Waldfischbach – Kaiserslautern	Hourly
RB 68	Pirmasens – Pirmasens Nord – Zweibrücken – St. Ingbert – Saarbrücken	Hourly
