= Landau–Rohrbach railway =

Railway line in Germany

Landau–Rohrbach
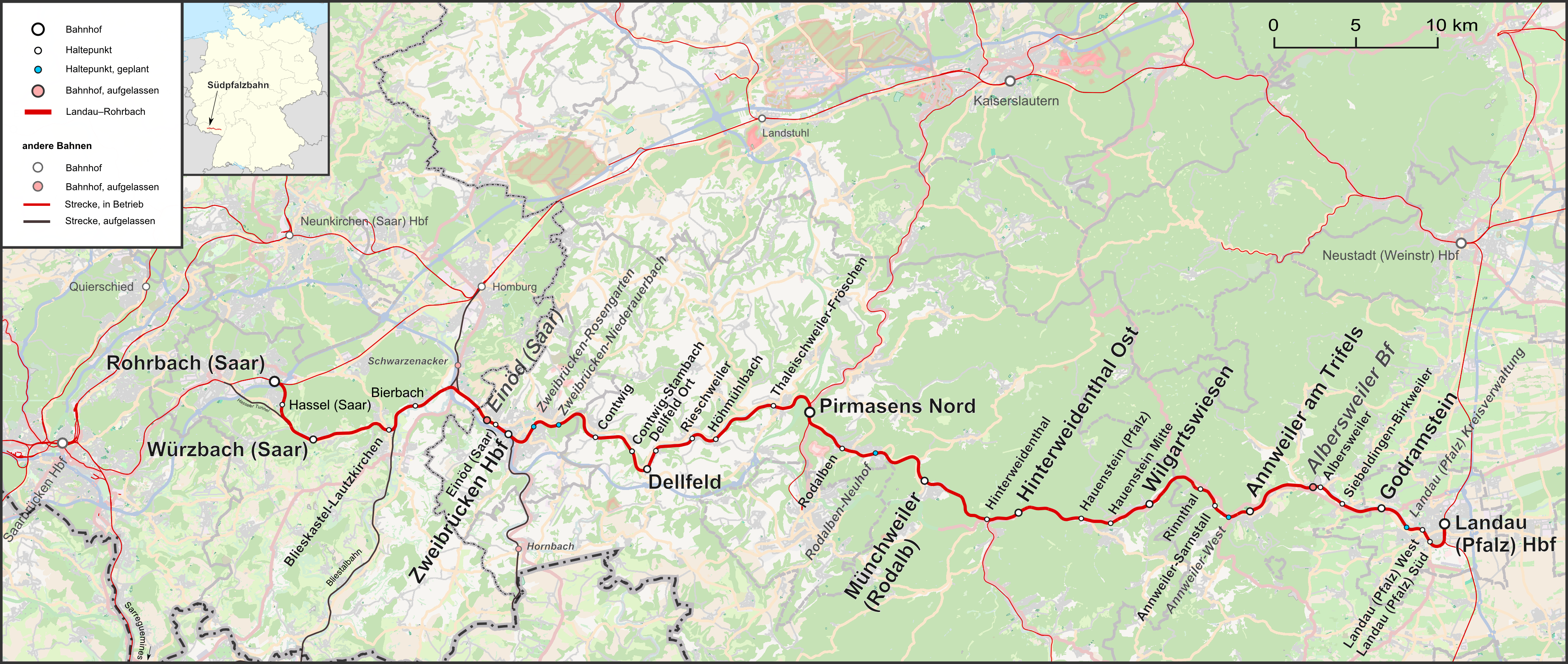

Overview
- Line number: 3450
- Locale: Rhineland-Palatinate, Saarland

Service
- Route number: 675 and 674

Technical
- Track gauge: 1,435 mm (4 ft 8 1/2 in) standard gauge
- Operating speed: 110 km/h (68.4 mph) (maximum)

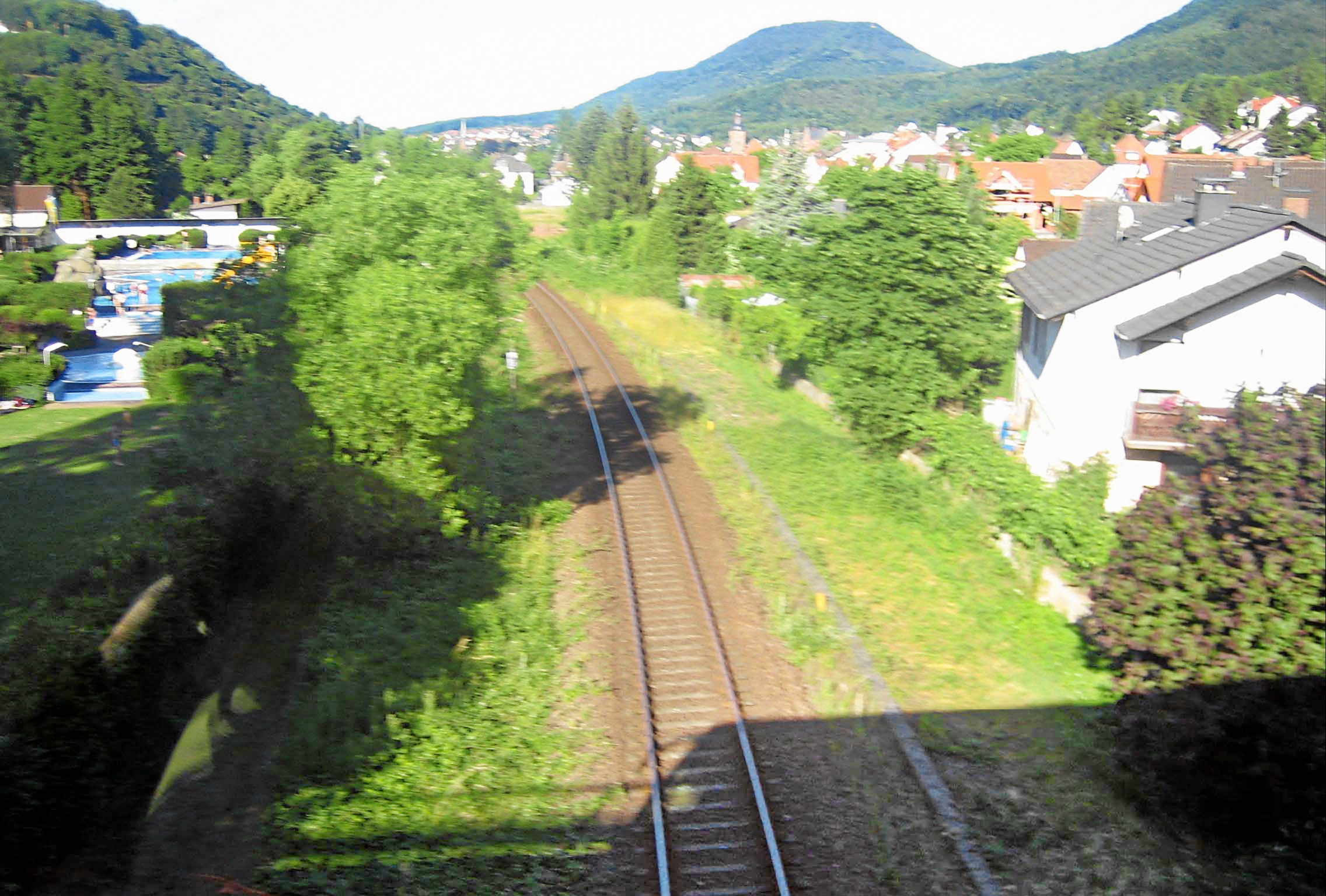
The Landau–Rohrbach railway between Annweiler and Rinnthal

The Landau–Rohrbach railway (sometimes called the Südpfalzbahn—"South Palatinate Railway"—or the Queichtalbahn—"Queich Valley Railway") is a major line running from Landau in the German state of Rhineland-Palatinate to Rohrbach in the Saarland. The main section between Landau and Zweibrücken was opened on 25 November 1875 after the first sections had already been opened between 1857 and 1867.

Although the Landau–Rohrbach railway was once a major east–west route for freight and was used for long-distance transport, the line is now used exclusively for regional passenger services.

== Marketing names ==
The alternate name of Queichtalbahn takes its name from the Queich river, which the line follows from Landau to Hauenstein. The line between Landau and Zweibrücken was built as a single line for the purposes of rail operations and was initially called the Südpfalzbahn or Südpfalz-strecke (Southern Palatinate railway or line), or occasionally the Queichtalbahn. Both terms are geographically somewhat misleading, as the line only runs through the Queich valley from Landau until shortly before Hauenstein and only the section from Landau to Hinterweidenthal is located within the Southern Palatinate.

Since 1994 the line has been split in the Deutsche Bahn timetable into two sections, east and west of Pirmasens Nord, the term Queichtalbahn is now mainly used for the eastern section from Landau to Pirmasens Nord, while the western part is often called the Schwarzbachtalbahn (Schwarzbach Valley Railway) as the line runs from Pirmasens Nord to Zweibrücken through the valley of the Schwarzbach.

== Route ==
The Landau–Rohrbach railway begins in Landau Central Station (Landau (Pfalz) Hauptbahnhof). After leaving the station, it branches off the Palatine Maximilian Railway to the left and runs around the city of Landau in a wide arc. In the latter, it stops at Landau (Pfalz) West station and Godramstein station. It then runs along the Queich valley through the Südliche Weinstraße district. Between Godramstein and Albersweiler, it runs through the Palatinate wine region and crosses the German Wine Route at a level crossing next to Siebeldingen-Birkweiler station.

After Albersweiler, it runs through the Palatinate Forest (Pfälzerwald) to Hinterweidenthal on the northern edge of the Wasgau, which lies between the southern Palatinate Forest and the northern Vosges. It runs through the Annweiler and a landscape called the Dahner Felsenland, which has bizarre sandstone cliffs, castles on rocks, notably the “trinity castles” (Burgdreifaltigkeit) of Trifels, Anebos and Münz near Annweiler and rock formations between Rinnthal and Wilgartswiesen. In Wilgartswiesen, the Landau–Rohrbach railway leaves the Queich valley and runs through the Hinterweidenthal, a narrow depression that separates the Wasgau and the Middle Palatinate Forest, and it now passes through the Südwestpfalz district. After Hinterweidenthal Ost station, the Wieslauter Railway branches off to Bundenthal-Rumbach; it only operates from May to October on Sundays and public holidays. The Landau–Rohrbach railway leaves the Wasgau here and passes through the Gräfensteiner Land, the southwestern part of the Middle Palatinate Forest, running under the main watershed of the Palatinate through the Münchweiler tunnel. The railway then runs along the Rodalb river through Münchweiler an der Rodalb and after passing through the Neuhof tunnel to the town of Rodalben. Arriving at the western edge of the Palatinate forest, the line reaches the railway junction of Pirmasens Nord (formerly Biebermühle).

From Thaleischweiler-Fröschen to Zweibrücken, the line crosses the predominantly agriculturally dominated Westricher plateau. It runs through many curves through the Schwarzbach valley, which is located between rolling hills; the valley floor is mostly used as grazing land and its slopes are reserved for forests. Shortly before the confluence of the Schwarzbach with the Blies, it passed through Zweibrücken Central Station. It then crosses the state border with Saarland at Einöd and now runs through the Saar-Palatinate district.

Between Einöd and Blieskastel-Lautzkirchen it passes through the broad lowlands of the Blies, which is mainly covered by meadows and pastures. From Lautzkirchen it follows the wooded Würzbach valley, which separates the Kirkeler forest from the plateau of Bliesgau, which has a more open landscape character. It passes the Würzbach pond (Niederwürzbacher Weiher), a major regional centre for tourism and finally runs through Hassel to Rohrbach, where it meets the Palatine Ludwig Railway from Homburg. After a few kilometres St. Ingbert is reached.

== History ==
=== Planning and construction (1844–1875) ===
==== Zweibrücken–Einöd and Bierbach–Saarbrücken sections ====
Historically, the Landau–Rohrbach railway is an amalgamation of several lines. The oldest part is the Einöd–Zweibrücken section, which was created as part of the Blies Valley Railway (German: Bliestalbahn), a branch line from Homburg to Zweibrucken. In 1844, a committee was formed in Zweibrücken to promote a branch line from Homburg. Initially this project, however, met with resistance in both cities. Fears were raised that it would seriously damage trade and commerce in Homburg. In Zweibrücken the reservations were based on the fear that the town would now be exposed to considerable smoke pollution.

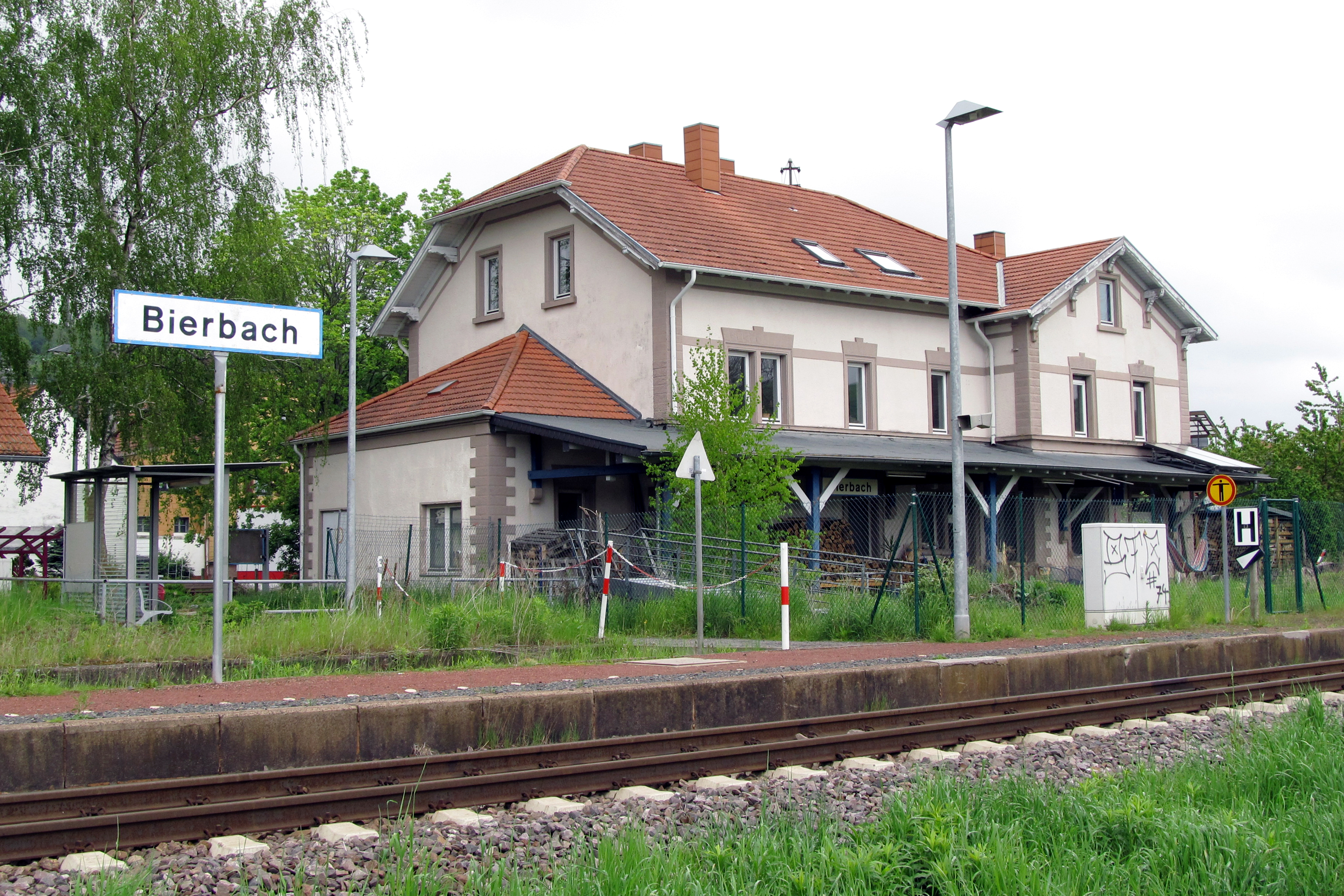
Bierbach station building opened in 1867

Once the Palatine Ludwig Railway was completed from Ludwigshafen to Bexbach, the railway engineer Paul Camille von Denis considered the plans and concluded that a line from Homburg to Zweibrücken would be profitable. Construction work began the line to Zweibrücken via Schwarzenacker on 1 June 1856 and the line was opened on 7 May 1857. The Ludwig Railway was extended during 1866 and 1867 from Schwarzenacker to St. Ingbert via Bierbach.

==== Landau–Zweibrücken section ====
Early efforts were made to promote the building of a line from Zweibrücken to Landau; there was support for this especially in the towns in the Queich valley. The Palatinate Railway (Pfalzbahn) at first rejected this proposal because it opposed competition with the Palatine Ludwig Railway and it considered the construction of the section through the Palatinate Forest would be very costly. However, the Queich valley communities did not give up and continued to campaign for the construction of such a link. It would especially benefit Annweiler, which had growing industries, but the towns and villages between Landau and Annweiler would also benefit from a rail link.

Against this background, the planning committee initially considered, as an alternative solution, the establishment of a branch line from Landau to Annweiler. Then, however, the committee acceded to pressure from the city of Landau and also strongly supported the construction of a line from Landau to Zweibrücken. This time its efforts were successful: the committee was authorised to prepare a suitable design, but it had to finance this work itself. The necessary concession was issued on 1 April 1865.

There were disagreements over the route between Pirmasens and Zweibrucken, which were eventually reflected in two different designs. The first draft favoured a new line directly via Hengsberg, while the second option was an alignment through Walshausen and along the Trualbe through Hornbach and Ixheim. More detailed studies, however, led to the conclusion that it would be difficult to build a direct southern Palatinate line via Pirmasens on either route due to the difficult topography. Therefore, a new approach was developed, with the line running a few kilometres north of the city. It would, coming from the east, initially run through the valley of the Rodalb and then follow the Schwarzbach. This route had the advantage of only having a slight slope to overcome and only requiring one tunnel, the Neuhof Tunnel near Rodalben.

First, the Landau–Annweiler section was built, partly over sections of the Albersweiler Canal, which had been built in the late 17th century, and operations started on 12 September 1874. As early as 25 November 1875, the line was extended to Zweibrücken and connected to the link to the Palatine Ludwig Railway. Conceptually, it was a direct continuation of the Germersheim–Landau railway and the official chainage (distance markings) run in sequence over both routes. At the same time, a branch line was opened from Biebermühle station, which is located at the confluence of the Rodalb with the Schwarzenbach, to Pirmasens. In addition, the original Zweibrücken station was not in an appropriate location for a through station and it had to be so moved to its present location. Although the line was initially built as a single track, its track base, engineering structures and crossings were designed to be duplicated.

=== Development for the main east-west link (1875–1945) ===
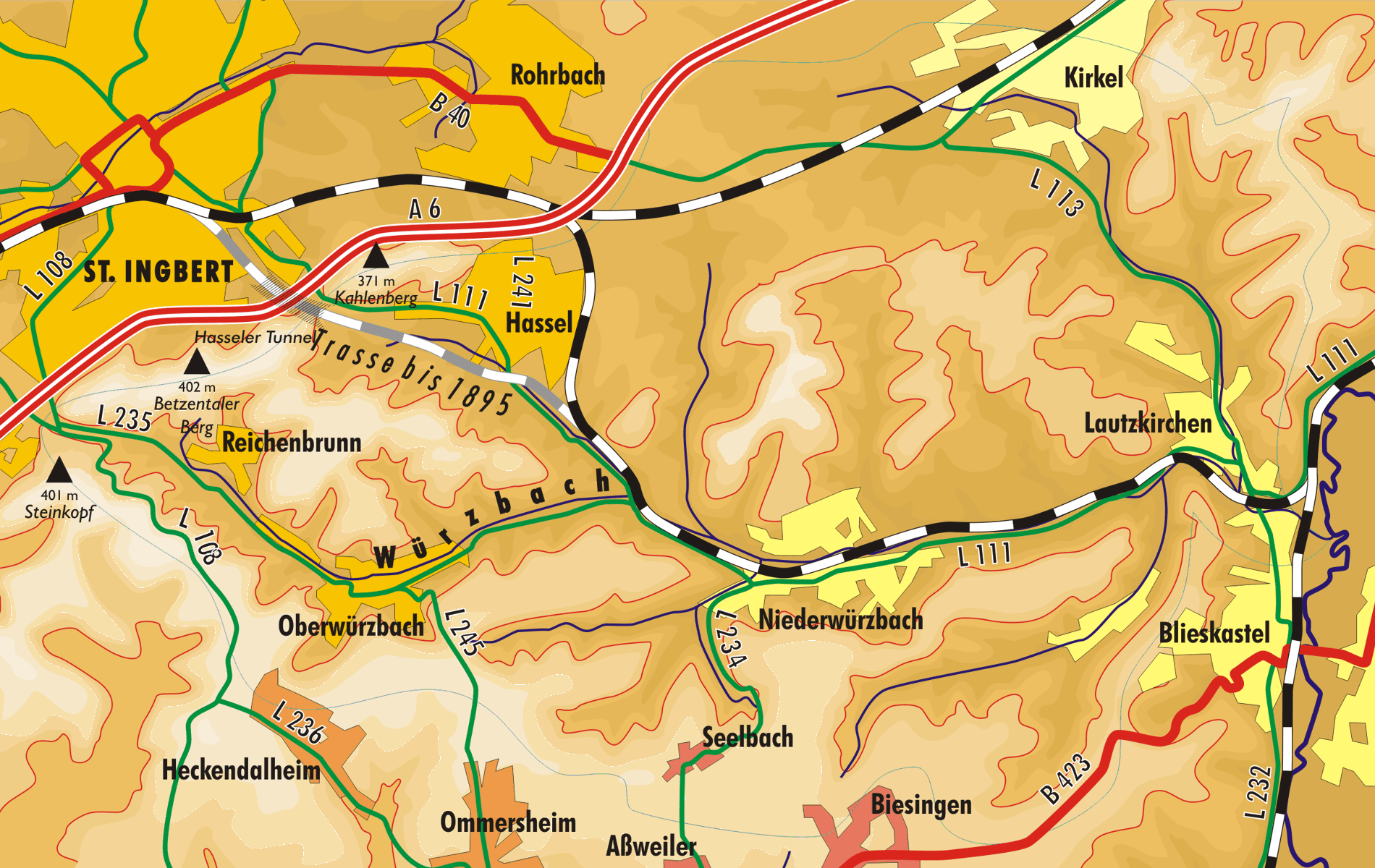
Realignment of the western part of the line in 1895

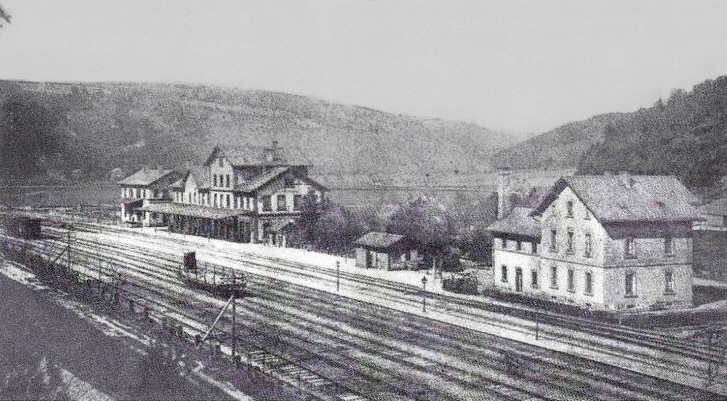
Pirmasens Nord (then Biebermühle) station in 1900

After the Bruhrain Railway (Bruhrainbahn) between Bruchsal and Rheinsheim had been extended to Germersheim in May 1877, the now continuous connection became one of the major freight routes in Germany, carrying mainly coal and iron from the Saar region to the industrial centres of the upper Rhine and southern Germany. In contrast, passenger traffic played a minor role in the first few years. But this changed in the late 1880s, because now in addition to local trains, national and even international long-distance trains used the line. From 1890, the Queichtalbahn included long-distance trains on the Munich–Stuttgart–Bruchsal–Germersheim–Landau–Biebermühle (now Pirmasens Nord)–Zweibrücken–Rohrbach–St. Ingbert–Saarbrücken route. This high traffic density made it necessary to increase the capacity of the line, so that was the line from Landau to Bierbach was continuously duplicated from 1887.

The existing Hasseler Tunnel, which was opened in 1867 between Hassel and St. Ingbert, had over the years developed more and more structural defects, so that it could be operated at low speed for safety reasons. It was also quite small, with a width of 3.08 metres and a clear height of 4.44 metres. Above all, the military criticised the condition of the tunnel, since it was a bottleneck and thus was not sufficient to ensure, if necessary, the rapid transport of troops and ordnance to France. For this reason, an approximately 2.5 kilometre-long deviation was built between Hassel and St. Ingbert and taken into operation in September 1895, which also made to relocation of Hassel station necessary. The direct connection from Hassel to St. Ingbert was closed and dismantled, and all trains ran from that date ran on the new link between Hassel and Rohrbach. Also in 1904 a further shortening of Palatine Ludwig Railway was put into operation, running via Kirkel and Limbach. These changes had the effect of making the Rohrbach–Einöd–Zweibrücken line part of the South Palatine Railway from Landau to Saarbrücken.

On 1 December 1911, a branch of the Landau–Rohrbach railway, the Wieslauter Railway (Wieslauterbahn) was opened on the Hinterweidenthal–Dahn–Bundenthal-Rumbach route. From that time, the Bundenthaler service operated on this line on Sundays, starting in Ludwigshafen am Rhein, then running on the Palatine Ludwig Railway (Ludwigshafen–Neustadt), and the Palatine Maximilian Railway (Neustadt–Landau) and from Landau to Hinterweidenthal over the Landau–Rohrbach railway. A new junction station called Hinterweidenthal was opened specifically for this new line, while the existing Hinterweidenthal-Kaltenbach station was renamed Kaltenbach. In another name change carried out in 1936, the former station of Biebermühle was renamed Pirmasens Nord, although it is several kilometres away from Pirmasens, and is not even within the municipality’s boundaries. In addition, the performance of the line was improved with technical innovations, including at Zweibrücken station, which acquired two electro-mechanical signal boxes in 1940.

=== Gradual loss of significance (Deutsche Bundesbahn 1945–1993) ===
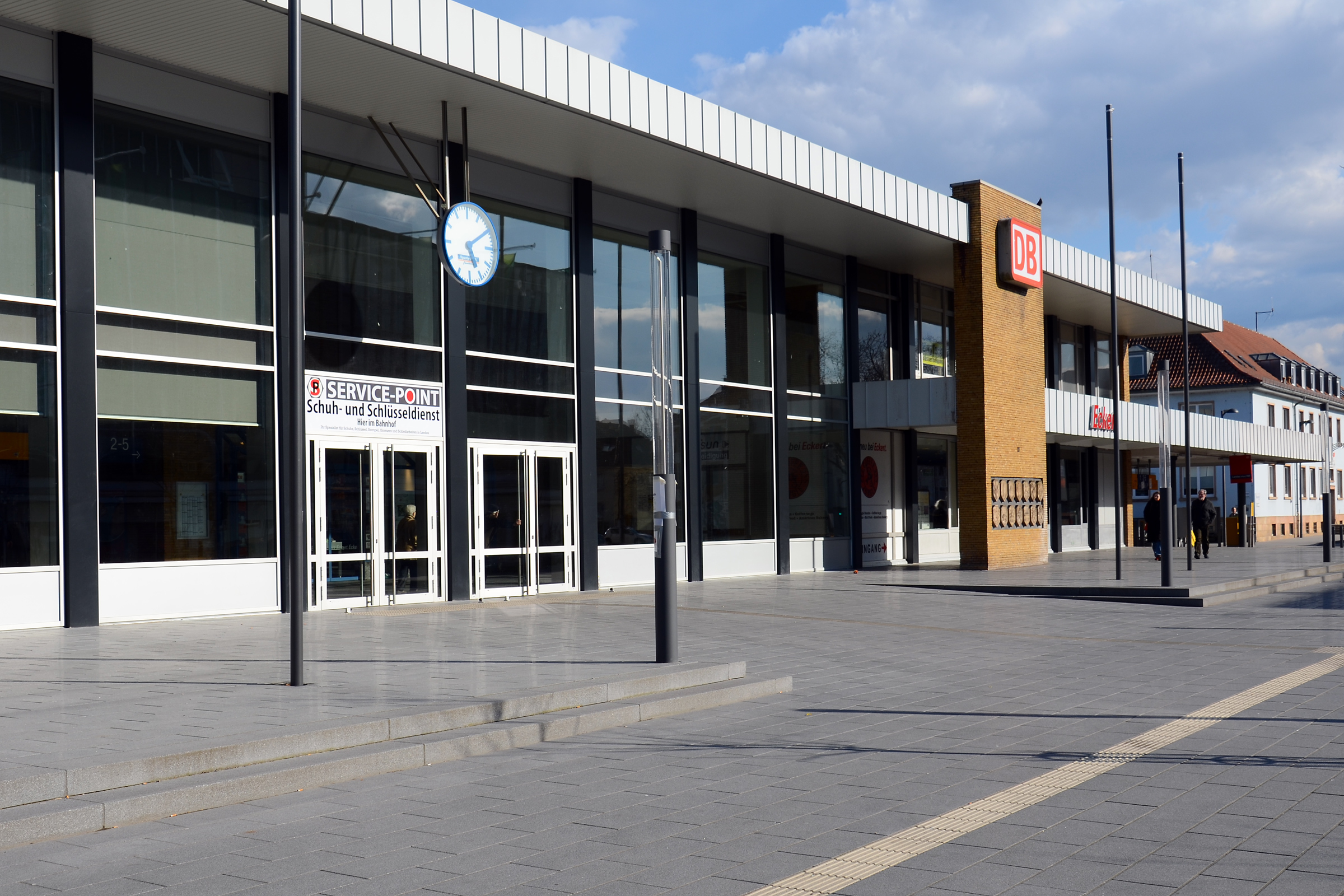
Landau station building opened after the Second World War

As a result of German defeat in World War II, there was an initial decline of the Landau–Rohrbach railway when the second track of the line was removed between 1945 and 1948 as part of German reparations during the French occupation. Also affecting the development of the Southern Palatinate line was the electrification of the Palatine Ludwig Railway, which took place in the years 1960–1964. Especially in the Kaiserslautern–Neustadt section, the difficult topography (including many tunnels) meant that this work required single-track operations and speed restrictions so that the capacity of the line was limited. For this reason, during the same period freight traffic was diverted over the Queichtalbahn, so that there was an initial increase of traffic on the line. However, this changed with the completion of electrification work in 1964. The freight on the Queichtalbahn declined rapidly as it now largely ran over the much higher-capacity Palatine Ludwig Railway. For passengers, the line regained some of its importance for the operation of long-distance trains, especially from Saarbrücken to southern Germany, because the line is somewhat shorter that the Palatine Ludwig Railway. In this context, Landau also received a new station building, as the old building was very badly damaged during the war. The centenary of the line in 1975 was celebrated with steam train services, among other things.

These improvements were countered in the 1980s and 1990s by other developments that led to a further decline of the Queichtalbahn. Initial losses occurred from 1981 when the stations of Rodalben, Hauenstein, Rinnthal and Landau West were gradually downgraded in status to halts (Haltepunkten) and their station buildings became unavailable for passengers and staff. Albersweiler station was abandoned and was replaced by a more favourably located halt. In 1982, the 125th anniversary of the connection between Zweibrücken and Homburg, was celebrated with a visit by a Trans-Europ-Express. However, three years later this line was closed.

These rationalisation measures at first had no effect on the passenger traffic between Rohrbach and Landau. Thus, from 31 May 1985, regular-interval express trains ran at two-hour intervals on the Queichtalbahn on the Saarbrücken–Stuttgart, Saarbrücken–Munich, Saarbrücken–Karlsruhe, Saarbrücken–Basel Badischer Bahnhof and the Berchtesgaden–Saarbrücken routes. Trains had to reverse in Landau to run on the Palatine Maximilian Railway towards Karlsruhe and Munich. Subsequently, however, there was a continuous reduction in long-distance services on this route, which ultimately led to the end of long-distance services. For example, in 1988, the last D-Zug express running on the Queichtalbahn from Saarbrücken to Stuttgart and Munich was abandoned so that between Landau and Rohrbach only local trains and semi-fast trains operated. In addition, the semi-fast trains only ran as far as Stuttgart, sometimes only to Karlsruhe. Further restrictions occurred particularly in 1991: the former semi-fast trains were replaced by regional express trains (Regionalschnellbahnen), which basically ran just to Karlsruhe.

Additionally, the connecting curve between Einöd and Homburg was removed in the same year. This rationalisation culminated in 1993, with Deutsche Bundesbahn's railway division of Saarbrücken developing plans to abandon the Annweiler–Pirmasens section permanently.

=== Developments under Deutsche Bahn since 1993 ===
After the restructuring of the German railways after the reunification of Germany, the proposed rationalisation described above was postponed. Although the plans for the complete closure of the line were not realised, rail service were further reduced. Already in 1994, the focus was on developing regional rapid transit, so inter-regional passenger services disappeared and the line finally became a purely regional line. At the same time it was in divided into two sections in the railway timetable, the Pirmasens–Saarbrücken section was now listed as table (KBS) 674 (Schwarzbachtalbahn, "Schwarzbach Valley Railway") and the Pirmasens–Landau section appeared as KBS 675 (Queichtalbahn, "Queich Valley Railway").

From 1997, it was attempted to make the Queichtalbahn more attractive for different customer groups, especially for tourist-oriented services. As part of this program, the Rosengartenexpress service was introduced in 1997; it operated on Sundays and public holidays as an excursion train from Landau to Zweibrücken and was categorised as a Regional-Express. Here, the name referred to Zweibrücken's Rosengarten (rose garden), which is a nationally-known landmark. However, the operation of the Rosengartenexpress train was abandoned two years later due to low utilisation. In the same year, on 1 July 1997, regular services resumed on the Wieslauter Railway. In the meantime, the abandoned Hinterweidenthal station was reactivated and was given the new name of Hinterweidenthal Ost.

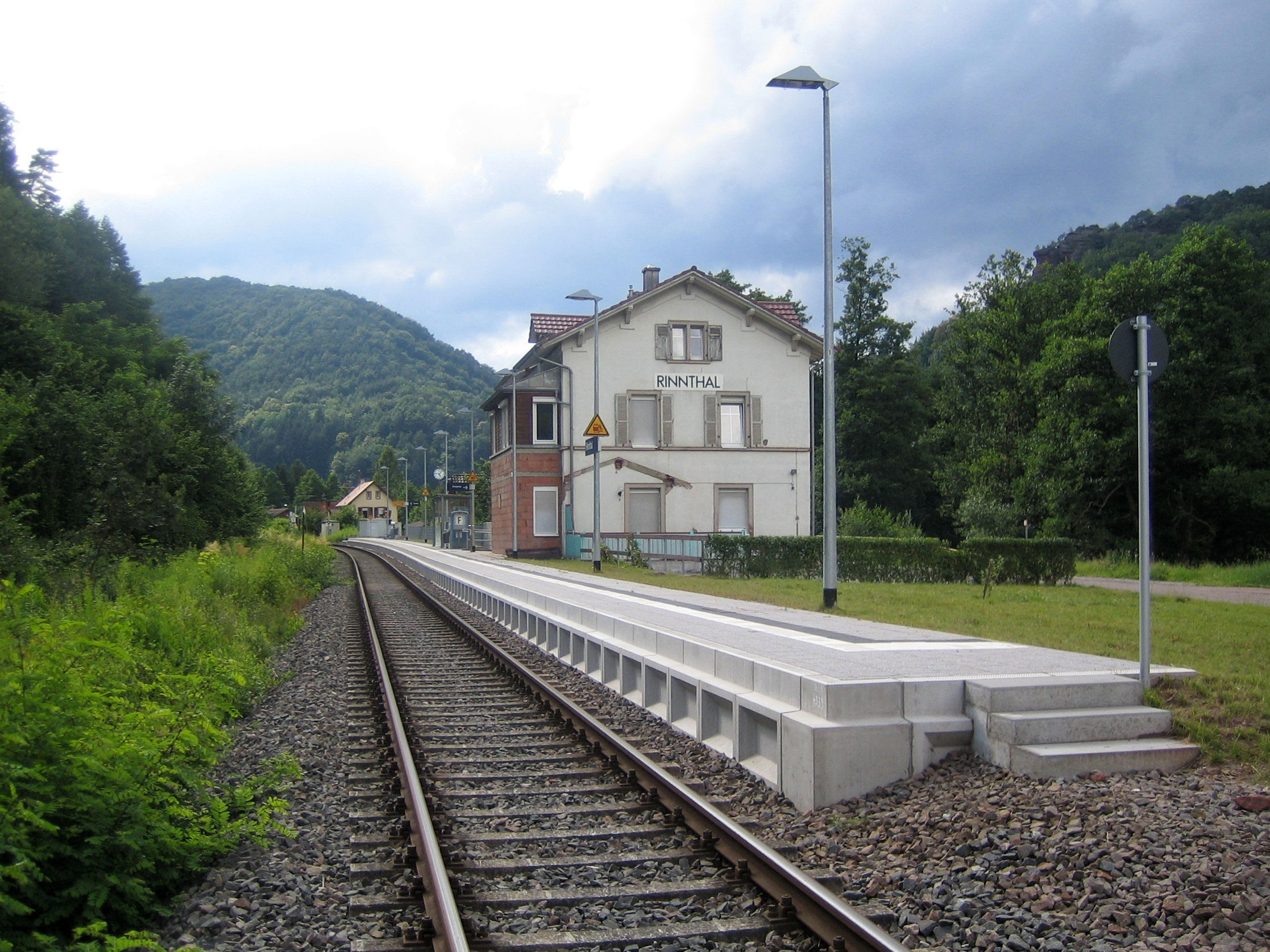
Rinnthal station modernised in 2007

In September 2000, the 125th anniversary of the Queich Valley Railway was celebrated with steam train services operated by the Ulm Railway Society (Ulmer Eisenbahnfreunde, UEF), so the Queich Valley Railway came back into the public consciousness. The infrastructure of the line has been modernised over the years. In April 2010, an electronic interlocking was installed in Landau; since then signalling and switching at Landau station and Godramstein station have been remotely controlled from Neustadt. In the near future, the trains on the Queichtalbahn will be coupled (or uncoupled) in Landau with the Regional-Express trains on the Neustadt–Karlsruhe line to provide a transfer-free connection to and from Karlsruhe. Since 11 December 2011, the new Zweibrücken-Rosengarten station has been served by regular passenger services. In this context, the Public Transport Association of Rhineland-Palatinate South (Zweckverband SchienenPersonenNahVerkehr Rheinland-Pfalz Süd) is planning to open Annweiler-Sarnstall station in June 2012.

== Operations ==
=== Passenger services ===
The Landau–Rohrbach railway was for decades part of the east-west Saarbrücken–Bruchsal route, which was used in 1939 by trains running to/from Munich on timetable route 242, along with other services. After the Second World War, it gradually lost long-distance services.

The route is now operated by Deutsche Bahn. Its western section is part of timetable (KBS) route 674: Saarbrücken–Pirmasens, while the eastern section forms KBS route 675: Landau–Pirmasens. Since December 2010 it is operated mainly with class 642 (Siemens Desiro) diesel multiple units, replacing class 643 (Bombardier Talent) DMUs on the Saarbrücken–Pirmasens Nord section and class 628 DMUs on the Landau–Pirmasens Nord section.

The trains in the eastern sector operate mostly at hourly intervals under the Rhineland-Palatinate integrated timetable (Rheinland-Pfalz-Takt) with trains usually crossing in Annweiler and Münchweiler and serving all stations with the exception of Hinterweidenthal Ost. Since 1994, trains reverse in Pirmasens Nord station in order to run along the southern section of the Biebermühl Railway to Pirmasens Central Station. From 1994 to 1996, the trains operated over the Palatine Maximilian Railway to Neustadt. Since 1994, trains on the western section also run to Pirmasens Central Station, Pirmasens, running to and from Saarbrücken at hourly intervals.

=== Freight ===
Most freight on the Landau–Rohrbach railway in its first decades was coal transported from the Saar, but this declined very much over the years and is now completely abandoned. The reduction of the line to single-track for reparations after the Second World War played a major role in the loss of freight. Thus, due to the high number of train crossings on the remaining two-track sections that had been left in stations and the resulting delays to passenger trains, freight trains were increasingly diverted to the Palatine Ludwig Railway. Because of these problems, there has been no freight trains on the eastern part of the line since 1998; before that freight was limited to the Landau–Wilgartswiesen section.

Zweibrücken Central Station once had an extensive system of freight tracks, but these have now been completely dismantled. The John Deere company, which manufactures agricultural equipment, has a factory in Zweibrücken, from which freight trains were loaded with combine harvesters before the traffic converted to road transport. One reason for this move was that the limited clearance of the line prevented viable transportation by rail. In 2002, the last freight loading point on the line at Thaleischweiler-Fröschen was closed; its last customer was the company Reno, a retailer of shoes. Since then, there has been no freight traffic on the line.
