= Pirmasens Hauptbahnhof =

Railway station in Pirmasens, Germany

Pirmasens Hbf
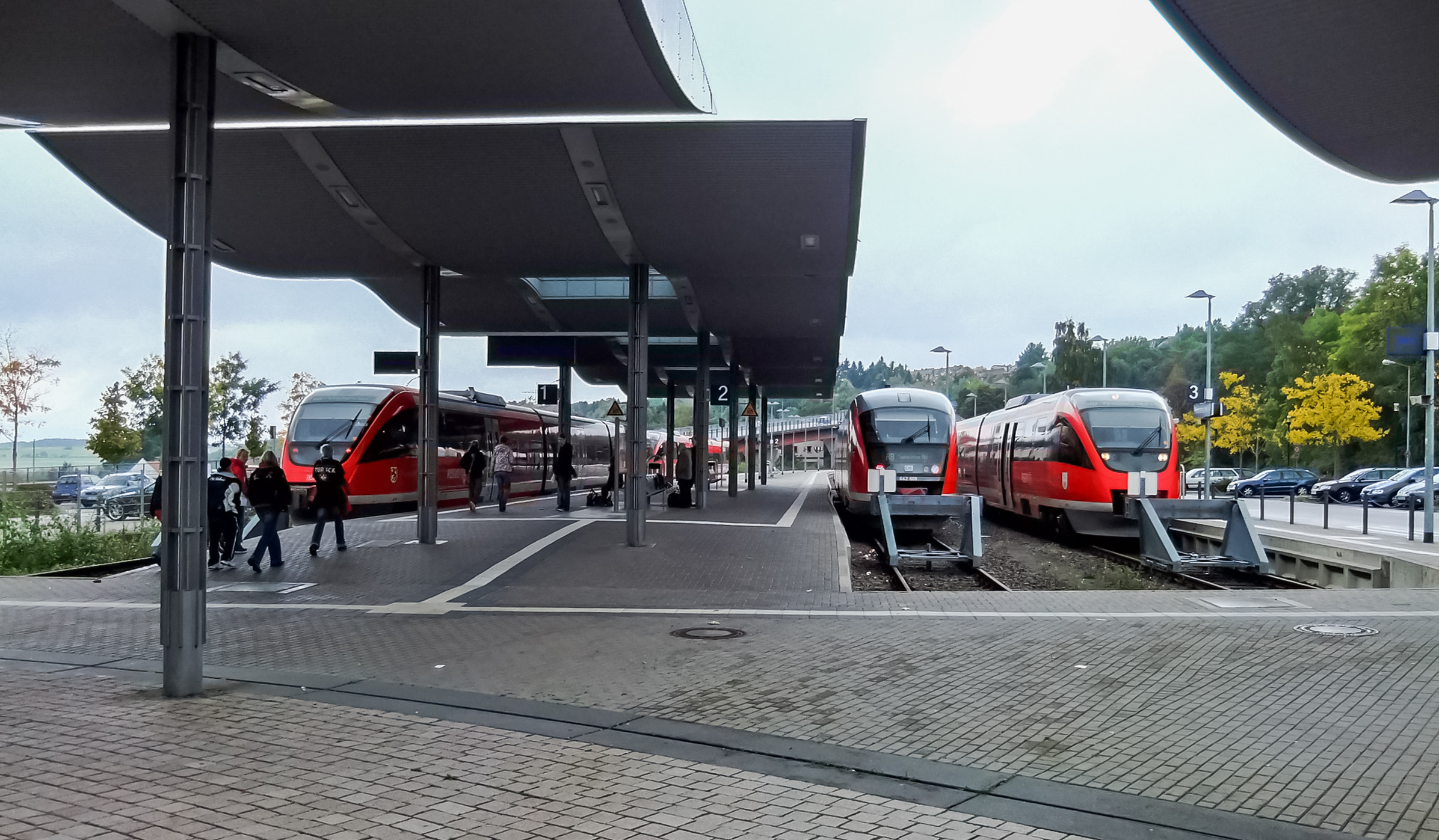

General information
- Location: Bahnhofstr. 50, Pirmasens, Rhineland-Palatinate; Germany
- Coordinates: 49°12′20″N 7°35′54″E
- Lines: Biebermühl Railway (KBS 672)
- Platforms: 3

Construction
- Accessible: Yes

Other information
- Station code: 4941
- DS100 code: SPS
- IBNR: 8004822
- Category: 5
- Fare zone: VRN: 700
- Website: www.bahnhof.de

History
- Opened: 25 November 1875

Services
Preceding station	DB Regio Mitte	Following station
Terminus	RB 55	Pirmasens Nord towards Landau (Pfalz) Hbf
Terminus	RB 64	Pirmasens Nord towards Kaiserslautern Hbf
Pirmasens Nord towards Saarbrücken Hbf	RB 68	Terminus
Location
- Location within Rhineland-Palatinate Location within Germany Location within Europe

Pirmasens Hauptbahnhof is a terminal station in the town of Pirmasens, in the German state of Rhineland-Palatinate, about one kilometre from the city centre. It was opened on 25 November 1875 and is the terminus of the Biebermühl Railway (Biebermühlbahn), which was also opened in 1875 as a branch line from the Southern Palatinate Railway (Südpfalzbahn). The Pirmasens Nord station lies on the edge of Thaleischweiler-Fröschen, so Pirmasens Hauptbahnhof is actually the only station in the city of Pirmasens.

== Rail link ==
Due to the unfavourable geography of Pirmasens, the station is now only connected by a single track and non-electrified branch line. This route, called the Biebermühl Railway, runs almost seven kilometres north to Pirmasens Nord station. From Pirmasens Hbf Regionalbahn trains run to Kaiserslautern Hauptbahnhof over the Biebermühl Railway, to Saarbrücken Hauptbahnhof via Zweibrücken Hauptbahnhof and Rohrbach over the Schwarzbach Valley Railway and to Landau (Pfalz) Hauptbahnhof over the Queich Valley Railway, requiring a reversal in Pirmasens Nord.

== History ==
Pirmasens station was built in 1875 with the construction of the branch line from Biebermühl station (now Pirmasens Nord station) to Pirmasens. It was built by the Palatinate Railway (Pfalzbahn), which was taken over in 1909 by the Royal Bavarian State Railways (Königliche Bayerische Staats-Eisenbahnen). At the turn of the century, the small station was enlarged because it had become too small for its traffic. In 1907, the stations name was changed to Pirmasens Hauptbahnhof, although there was no other station in Pirmasens. Reflecting its importance for the city of Pirmasens, Biebermühl station was renamed Pirmasens Nord station in 1936, even though it still is not in the city of Pirmasens.

After a period when the station was controlled by France as a result of the First World War, the station was taken over in 1922 by Deutsche Reichsbahn. It belonged at first to the railway division at Ludwigshafen and from 1935 to the railway division at Saarbrücken.

During the Second World War, the station was severely damaged by bombing in 1941 and had to be rebuilt between 1952 and 1962. It now had five platform tracks instead of three. It was also connected to a new postal station on the south side of the station. On 1 April 1947, Pirmasens station was transferred to the control of the railway division at Mainz, as the Saarland had been separated from Germany. From 1 May 1972, until the founding of Deutsche Bahn AG in 1994, the station was under the control of the railway division in Saarbrücken.

In 1999, the line north from the passenger station to Pirmasens freight yard was permanently closed so that modernisation of the station could begin in 2001. This involved returning the station from five platform tracks to three tracks. Shunting is no longer possible.

Operations to Pirmasens station was limited in the past mainly to local trains between Pirmasens Hbf and Pirmasens Nord, where there were connections to the long-distance and local passenger trains running on the Queich Valley Railway to Saarbrücken or Landau and Karlsruhe Hauptbahnhof. Only a few trains from Pirmanses continued to Kaiserslautern. Otherwise, passengers had to change trains at Pirmasens Nord. When control of regional railway passenger transport in Germany was devolved to the regions in 1994, several services were established to and from Pirmasens Hauptbahnhof. These are called Regionalbahn services in the railway timetable.

In the 1930s trains to the station were usually hauled only by steam locomotives of class 86, which replaced mostly Bavarian and Palatine locomotives. In the 1960s these were replaced for passenger operations by railbuses of classes VT 95 and VT 98. In late 1987, these were replaced by class 628.2 diesel multiple units. These were in turn replaced by class 643 (Bombardier Talent) or 642 (Siemens Desiro) diesel multiple units.

From 1994 to 2002, there was also a Regional-Express service (RE 4) via Kaiserslautern to Bingen Hauptbahnhof, running via the Alsenz Valley Railway (Alsenztalbahn). Since then, passengers have had to change trains in Kaiserslautern to go to Bingen.

Since 2006, Regionalbahn services have been restored in the evenings, weekends and on holidays between Pirmasens and Karlsruhe.

== Urban transport ==
Pirmasens Hbf was first connected to central Pirmasens in 1905 by the Pirmasens Tramway (Straßenbahn Pirmasens), which was replaced in 1943 by Pirmasens Trolleybuses (Oberleitungsbus Pirmasens). Since 1967, the station has been served by the buses of Pirmasens Municipal Transport (Stadtwerke Pirmasens Verkehr).

== Operations ==
Pirmasens Hbf is currently served by the following Regionalbahn services:

Line	Route	Frequency
RB 55	Pirmasens – Pirmasens Nord – Landau (Pfalz) Hauptbahnhof	Hourly
RB 64	Pirmasens – Pirmasens Nord – Waldfischbach – Kaiserslautern Hauptbahnhof	Hourly
RB 68	Pirmasens – Pirmasens Nord – Zweibrücken – St. Ingbert – Saarbrücken	Hourly
