= Zweibrücken Hauptbahnhof =

Railway station in Zweibrücken, Germany

Zweibrücken Hbf
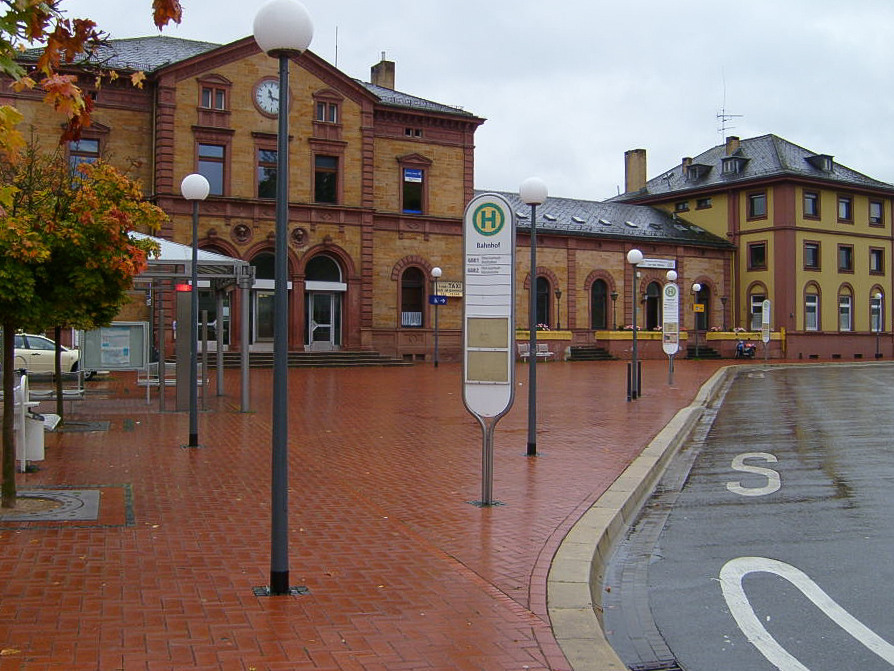

General information
- Location: Poststr. 37, Zweibrücken, Rhineland-Palatinate; Germany
- Coordinates: 49°14′49″N 7°21′25″E
- Lines: Pirmasens–Saarbrücken (KBS 674); Zweibrücken–Brenschelbach (closed); Homburg–Sarreguemines (closed)
- Platforms: 3

Construction
- Accessible: Yes

Other information
- Station code: 7066
- DS100 code: SZW
- IBNR: 510843
- Category: 5
- Fare zone: VRN: 709
- Website: www.bahnhof.de

History
- Opened: 25 November 1875

Services
Preceding station	DB Regio Mitte	Following station
Einöd (Saar) towards Saarbrücken Hbf	RB 68	Zweibrücken-Rosengarten towards Pirmasens Hbf
Location

Zweibrücken Hauptbahnhof is a through station with two platforms and three platform tracks in the city of Zweibrücken in the German state of Rhineland-Palatinate. It is located not far from the city centre, on the single-track, non-electrified, Queich Valley Railway, over which Regionalbahn trains operate between Saarbrücken Hauptbahnhof and Pirmasens Hauptbahnhof. It also connects with Landau, although this requires a change of trains at Pirmasens Nord.

== History ==
On 7 May 1857, the Blies Valley Railway (Bliestalbahn) was opened to neighbouring Homburg, now in the Saarland. On 25 November 1875, the extension of the Queich Valley Railway from Annweiler was opened to traffic. The extension of the Blies Valley Railway to Bierbach and Reinheim was opened in 1879. The link from Hornbach opened on 15 December 1913. Three years later, on 1 October 1916, the Hornbach railway was extended to Brenschelbach. After the Second World War, a series of closures and dismantlings were carried out. Until the 1980s the station was served by long-distance traffic of Deutsche Bundesbahn. Up to the station's reconstruction in 1991, when the number of track was reduced from 13 to four, the station was also served by freight traffic. In 2006, the platforms were modernised; this work included the installation of lifts.

== Location and infrastructure ==
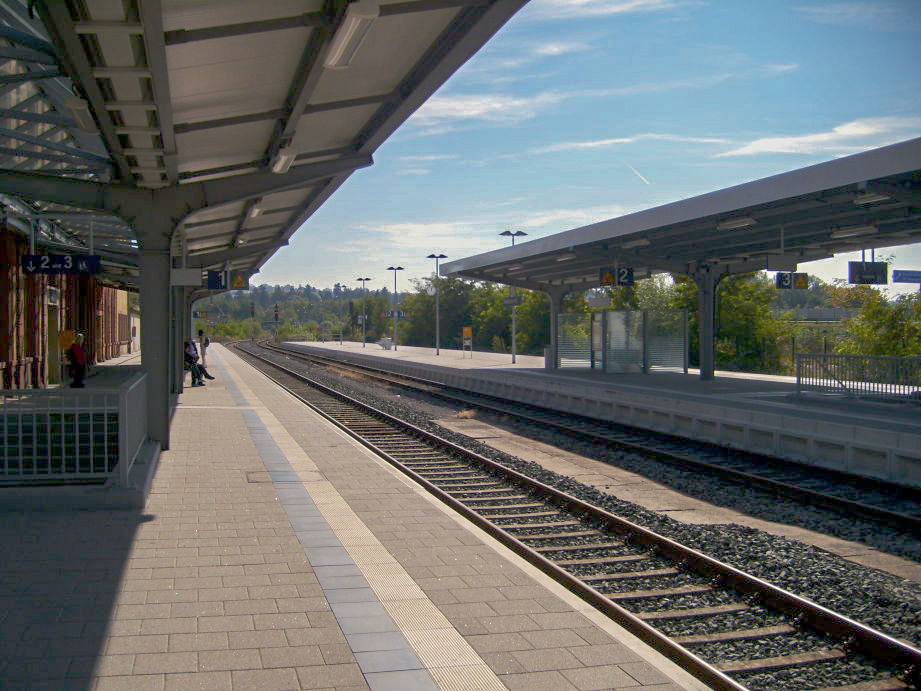
Platforms

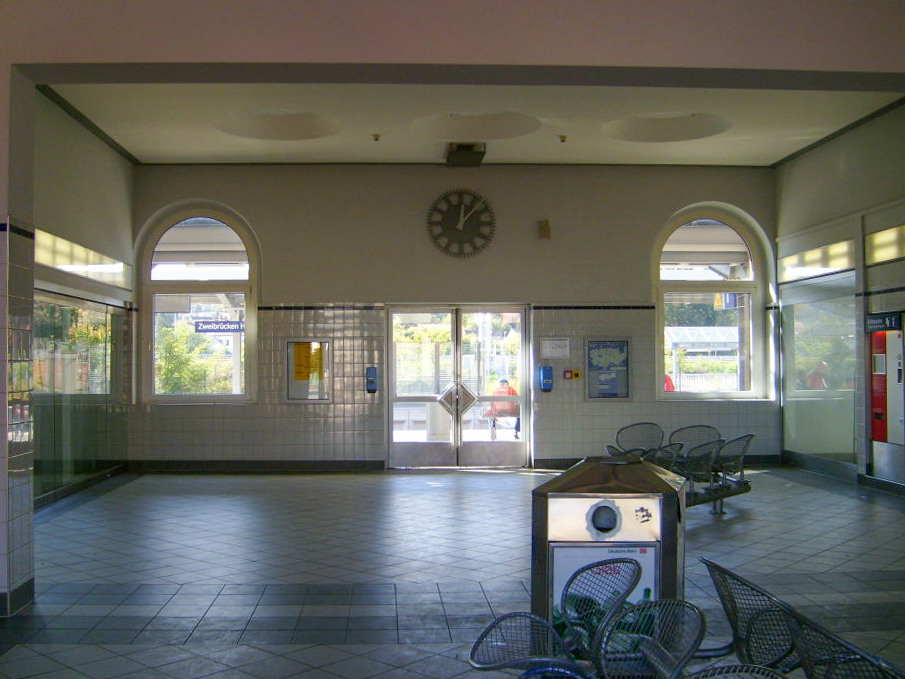
Station hall

The station is located west of the city of Zweibrücken at the southwest corner of Poststraße. The A 8 autobahn runs parallel and south of the station area. The station building has lockers, vending machines and toilets; there is also a bistro and a bar. The station forecourt has car parking and bike racks.

== Rail services ==
Zweibrücken station is served each hour by Regionalbahn line 68 operated by DB Regio Südwest.

Line	Route	Frequency
RB 68	Saarbrücken Hbf – St. Ingbert – Zweibrücken – Pirmasens	Hourly

There are also bus services from the station to Zweibrücken Airport and to Homburg. The latter serves as a replacement for the Blies Valley Railway closed in 1991.
