= Sankt Ingbert station =

Railway station in Sankt Ingbert, Germany

St Ingbert
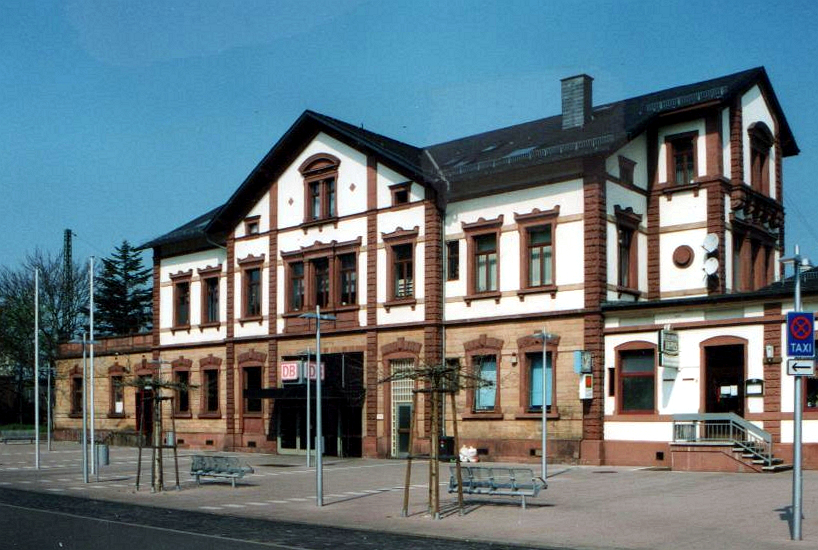
- St. Ingbert railway station

General information
- Location: Neue Bahnhofstr. 4, St. Ingbert, Saarland; Germany
- Coordinates: 49°16′28″N 7°06′38″E
- Lines: Mannheim–Saarbrücken railway; Landau–Rohrbach railway

Construction
- Accessible: Yes

Other information
- Station code: 5942
- DS100 code: SSI
- IBNR: 8005649
- Category: 3
- Fare zone: SaarVV: 571
- Website: www.bahnhof.de

History
- Opened: 1867/1879

Services
Preceding station	DB Regio Mitte	Following station
Saarbrücken Hbf towards Koblenz Hbf	RE 1 Südwest-Express	Homburg (Saar) Hbf towards Heidelberg Hbf
Saarbrücken Ost towards Saarbrücken Hbf	RB 68	Rohrbach (Saar) towards Pirmasens Hbf
Rentrisch towards Merzig (Saar)	RB 70	Rohrbach (Saar) towards Kaiserslautern Hbf
Rentrisch towards Schweich DB	RB 71	Rohrbach (Saar) towards Kaiserslautern Hbf
Location

Sankt Ingbert station (German: Bahnhof Sankt Ingbert) is a railway station in St. Ingbert, located in the federal state of Saarland, Germany. The station was originally opened in 1867, with the current concourse building completed in 1879. Positioned on the edge of the town center, it is one stop away from the central bus station. Classified as a class 3 station, Sankt Ingbert is served by several Regional-Express and Regionalbahn services operated by Deutsche Bahn.

== History ==
=== Initial operations ===
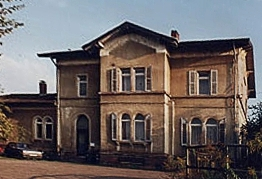
The old station building from 1867 in which there is now a restaurant.

Historical records indicate that the first station building was constructed in 1867 during the development of the Palatine Ludwig Railway between Homburg and St. Ingbert. For several years, the station functioned as a terminus until the 1870s, when a line extension to Saarbrücken was completed. Due to growing passenger numbers, a new station building was needed, resulting in the construction of the current building, situated south of the platforms and opposite its predecessor.

=== Interregio services ===
In the early 1970s, Sankt Ingbert station became a stop for Interregio trains traveling as far as Berlin and Paris, alongside semi-fast and local regional services. However, these Interregio services were discontinued following a 1991 timetable change and the introduction of an Interregio service between Stuttgart and Frankfurt-am-Main.

== Architecture ==
Architecturally, Sankt Ingbert station exemplifies the style of Saarland stations from that era. Notable features include the arched windows on the ground floor, rectangular windows on the first floor, and a generally sober design lacking vertical detailing. However, the single entrance through an avant-corps remains a distinctive aspect of the station's structure.

== Current operations ==
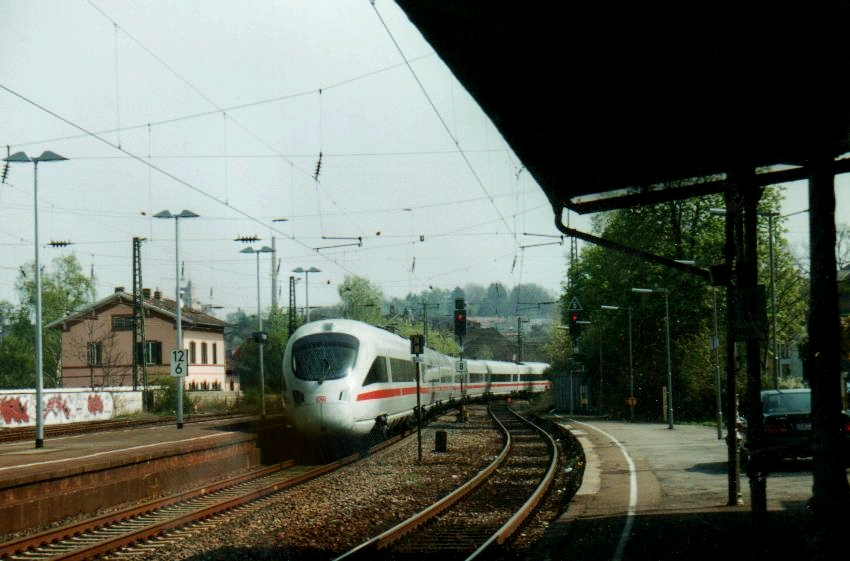
An Intercity-Express train passes through the station. The only services that stop here are shorter-distance regional services. The old station building is on the left.

All of the trains operating on the Palatine Ludwig Railway and the Landau–Rohrbach railway stop at the station. There are half-hourly services in the direction of Homburg, with hourly extensions to Kaiserslautern. In the other direction all services travel to Saarbrücken with extensions to Trier. On the Landau–Rohrbach railway, services travel to Pirmasens, with morning extensions to Landau via the Saar Railway.

Line	Route	Interval
RE 1	Koblenz Hbf – Trier Hbf – Saarbrücken Hbf – St. Ingbert – Kaiserslautern Hbf – Mannheim Hbf	60 min
RB 68	Saarbrücken Hbf – St. Ingbert – Rohrbach (Saar) – Zweibrücken Hbf – Pirmasens Hbf	60 min
RB 70	Saarbrücken Hbf – St. Ingbert – Homburg (Saar) Hbf – Kaiserslautern Hbf	60 min
RB 71	Dillingen (Saar) – Saarlouis Hbf – Saarbrücken Hbf – St. Ingbert – Homburg (Saar) Hbf	60 min
