= Hasseler Tunnel =

Tunnel in Saarland, Germany

Coordinates: 49°16′01″N 7°08′18″E

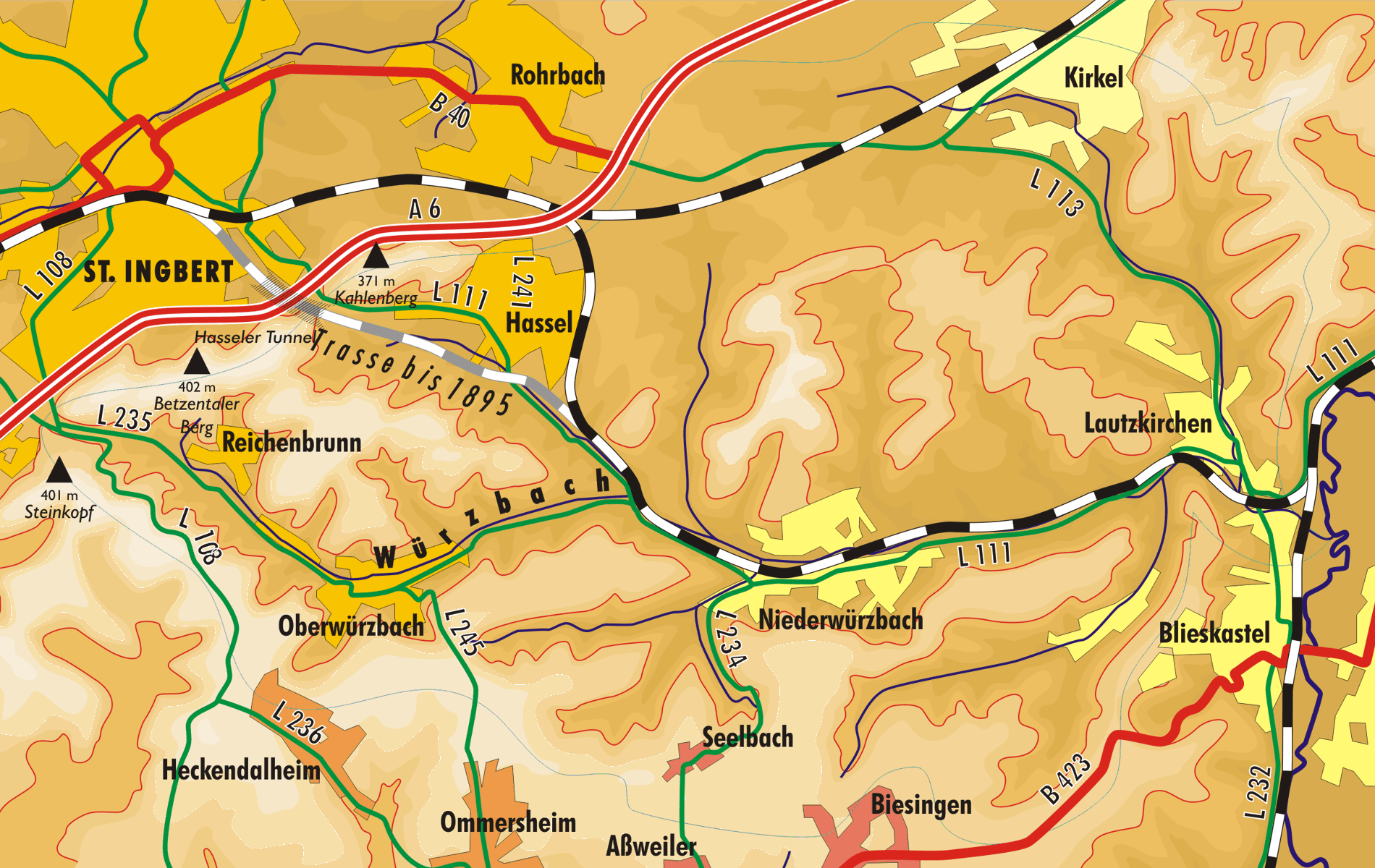
Hasseler Tunnel

Hasseler Tunnel was a 507-metre tunnel in Saarland, Germany.

== See also ==
- Palatine Ludwig Railway
