= Landau (Pfalz) Hauptbahnhof =

Railway station in Landau in der Pfalz, Germany

Landau (Pfalz) Hbf
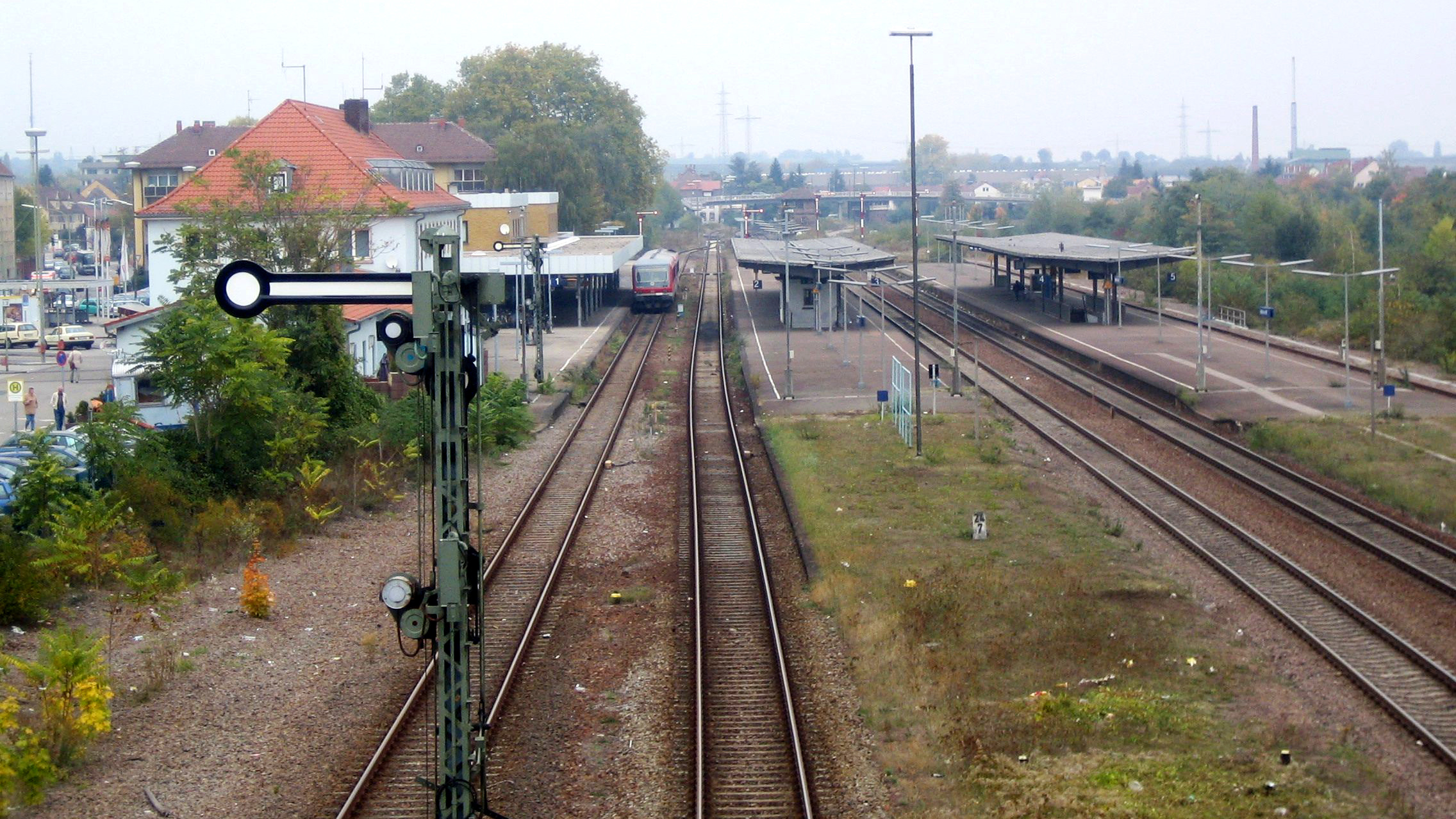
- Track field and platforms with a Regionalbahn service to Pirmasens

General information
- Location: Landau in der Pfalz, Rhineland-Palatinate; Germany
- Coordinates: 49°11′53″N 8°7′34″E
- Lines: Neustadt–Wissembourg railway; Landau–Rohrbach railway; former Germersheim–Landau railway
- Platforms: 5

Construction
- Accessible: Yes

Other information
- Station code: 3505
- DS100 code: RLA
- IBNR: 8000216
- Category: 4
- Fare zone: VRN: 192; KVV: 570 (VRN transitional tariff)
- Website: www.bahnhof.de

History
- Opened: 1855

Services
Preceding station	DB Regio Mitte	Following station
Neustadt (Weinstraße) Hbf towards Kaiserslautern Hbf	RE 6	Winden (Pfalz) towards Karlsruhe Hbf
Knöringen-Essingen towards Neustadt (Weinstraße) Hbf	RB 51	Insheim towards Karlsruhe Hbf
Knöringen-Essingen towards Neustadt (Weinstraße) Hbf	RB 53	Winden (Pfalz) towards Wissembourg
Landau (Pfalz) Süd towards Pirmasens Hbf	RB 55	Terminus
Location
- Location within Rhineland-Palatinate Location within Germany Location within Europe

Landau (Pfalz) Hauptbahnhof (Landau (Pfalz) main station) is the centre of public transport in the city of Landau in the German state of Rhineland-Palatinate.

== History ==
The history of the station begins in 1855, when the Palatine Maximilian Railway was opened on the Neustadt–Landau–Winden–Wissembourg route. In 1872, a new station building was built in the Romanesque revival style, replacing the original timber building. In the same year, the Lower Queich Valley Railway (Untere Queichtalbahn) was opened from Germersheim to Landau. The Landau–Rohrbach railway (also known as the Queichtalbahn—"Queich Valley Railway"), connecting Landau, Annweiler, Biebermühle and Zweibrücken, was opened in 1874/5.

Long-distance trains ran in all directions, on the Amsterdam–Bingerbrück–Bad Kreuznach–Neustadt–Landau–Strasbourg–Basel route and on the Munich–Ulm–Stuttgart–Bruchsal–Germersheim–Landau–Biebermühle–Zweibrücken–Saarbrücken route.

In 1898 the branch line to Herxheim was opened. The Palatine Overland Railway (Pfälzer Oberlandbahn), an overland tramway (interurban) running from Neustadt to Landau, was completed in 1913 to the station, but it was closed to Landau in 1953.

The station building was completely destroyed in World War II. A temporary structure existed for several years until the current station building was built. In the early 1980s, the Lower Queich Valley Railway and the branch line to Herxheim were closed. In the 1990s, the operations depot and the smaller marshalling yard were closed.

In 2010, the station was renovated, the platforms was modernised and lifts were installed.

== Operations ==
The main station consists of five platform tracks: tracks 1, 2 and 5 are served by trains on the Queich Valley Railway, although tracks 1 and 5 are rarely used. Track 3 and 4 are used by trains on the Maximilian Railway. Three services run in each direction on the Neustadt–Wissembourg railway, the RE 6 Regional-Express service on the Karlsruhe–Neustadt route, the RB 53 Regionalbahn service on the Neustadt–Wissembourg route and the RB 51 service on the Karlsruhe–Neustadt route, each hourly. Once an hour the RB 55 runs on the Landau–Rohrbach railway.

On Sundays and public holidays three pairs of regional long-distance services operate: the Elsass-Express from Mainz to Wissembourg, the Weinstraßenexpress from Wissembourg to Koblenz and the Bundenthaler: Mannheim–Bundenthal–Rumbach/Pirmasens. The train is split coupled in Hinterweidenthal Ost.

Buses operate to the suburbs from a central bus station located in the station forecourt.

In the station building there is a restaurant and a kiosk. On 2 September 2010 a new travel centre opened.
