= Kaiserslautern–Enkenbach railway =

Railway line in Germany

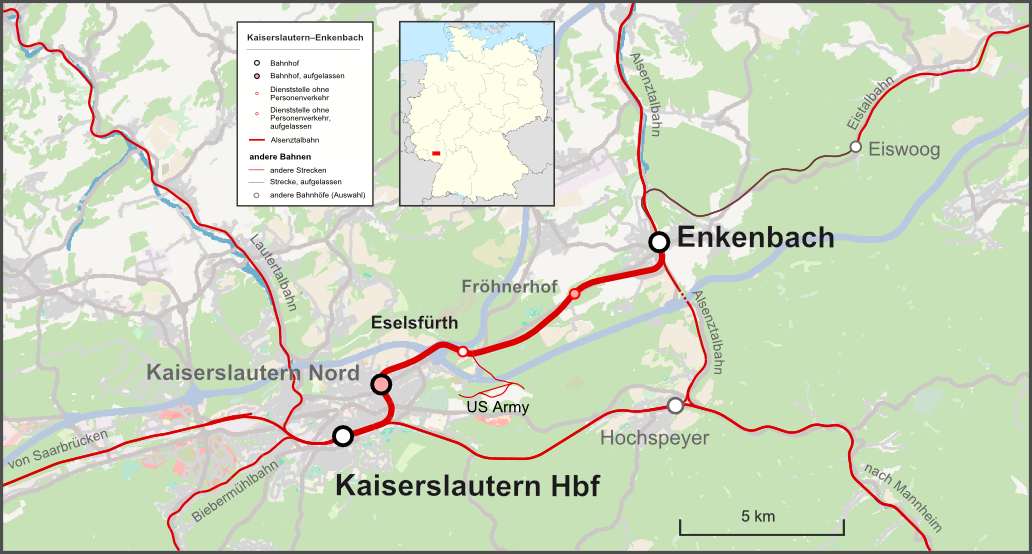

Overview
- Line number: 3303
- Locale: Rhineland-Palatinate, Germany

Service
- Route number: 672

Technical
- Track gauge: 1,435 mm (4 ft 8 1/2 in) standard gauge

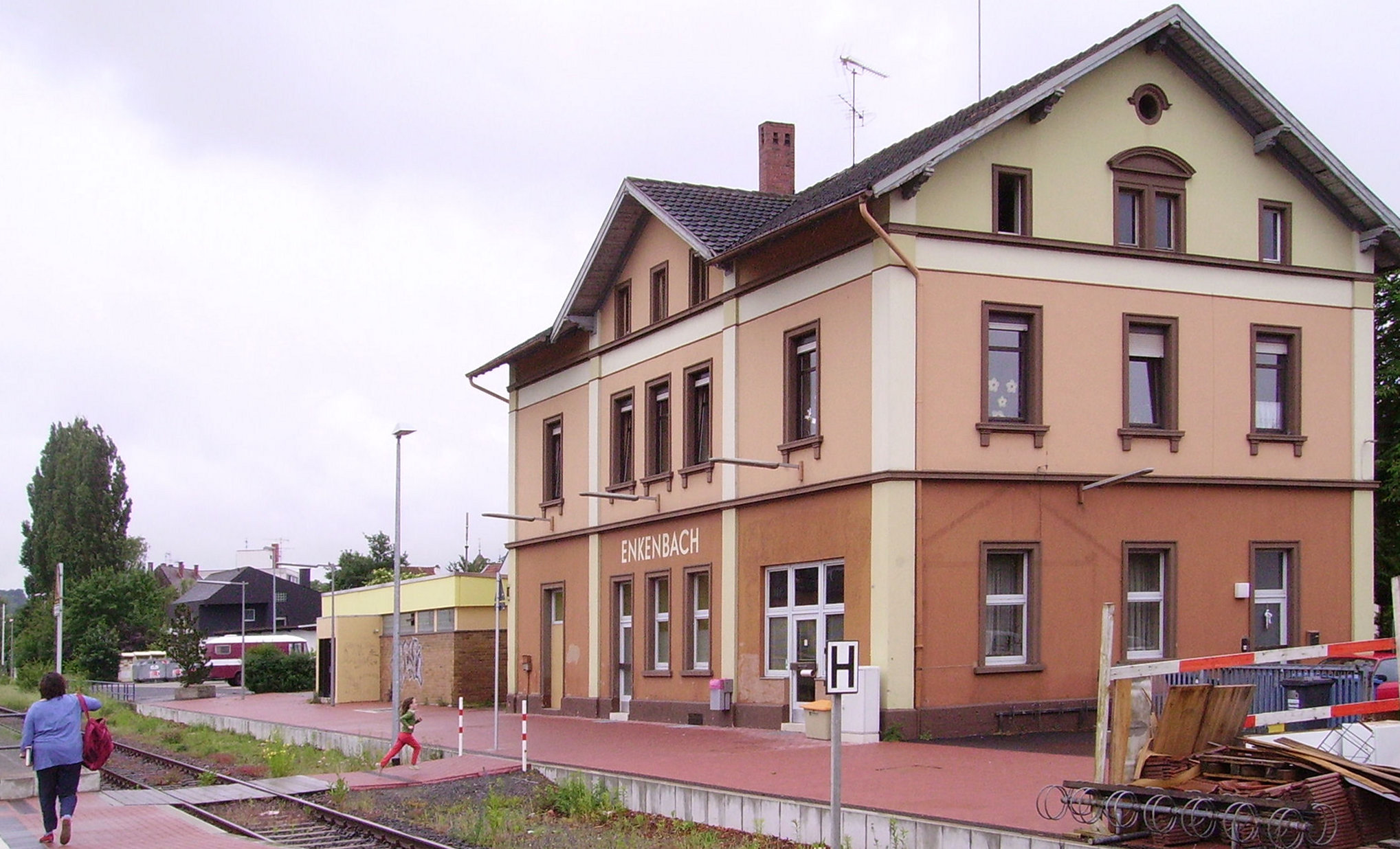
Enkenbach station

The Kaiserslautern–Enkenbach railway is a single-track main line in the Western Palatinate. It runs within the area of the Verkehrsverbund Rhein-Neckar (Rhene-Neckar transport association, VRN). It was built in 1875 to shorten the route for trains on the Alsenz Valley Railway (Alsenztalbahn) running to Kaiserslautern. In the following years, several express trains ran over this line. Passenger traffic was discontinued in 1987, but it was reactivated ten years later.

== History ==
=== Planning, construction and opening (1870–1875) ===
As early as 1863, a proposal was presented in a memorandum to build the so-called Donnersbergerbahn (Donnersberg railway) from Kaiserslautern via Kirchheimbolanden to a connection on the Rhineland border in Alzey. The course of the line was planned to run parallel to an important long-distance road that was already important at that time and later became federal highway B 40 and is now largely replaced by the A 63. During the development of this proposal, a route from Kaiserslautern via Enkenbach was conceived for the first time. Since it was feared that it would have negative effects on the operation and above all the income of the Palatine Ludwig Railway (Pfälzischen Ludwigsbahn), it was not built.

After the Franco-Prussian War of 1870 and 1871, there was an increased interest in strategic lines in South-West Germany. As a result, demands were made for a direct connection between Kaiserslautern and Enkenbach since the previous line via Hochspeyer was regarded as too indirect, especially after 1873 and 1874, when the Zeller Valley Railway (Zellertalbahn) between Langmeil and Monsheim and the Donnersberg Railway (Donnersbergbahn) between Alzey and Marnheim had been completed. The town of Kaiserslautern was particularly supportive of this, as it stood to benefit. The connection between Kaiserslautern and Enkenbach eventually came into operation on 15 May 1875. It included the intermediate stations of Kaiserslautern Nord and Eselsfürth.

=== Developments up to the Second World War (1875–1945) ===
The operator of the railway was the Palatine Northern Railway Company (Gesellschaft der Pfälzischen Nordbahnen). Because the Enkenbach–Eselsfürth–Kaiserslautern route is shorter than the route via Hochspeyer, most of the trains in the subsequent period—especially long-distance trains—ran towards Kaiserslautern via Eselsfürth. They ran via the Alsenz Valley Railway to Langmeil and from there to the Rhine-Main area via Worms to Frankfurt am Main or via Alzey to Mainz. Although it was originally planned to build a second track, it has always remained single-track.

On 1 January 1909, the line, together with the remaining railway routes within the Palatinate, were absorbed into the Royal Bavarian State Railways (Königliche Bayerische Staats-Eisenbahnen).

The line was absorbed into Deutsche Reichsbahn on 1 April 1920. The line was integrated into the newly founded Reichsbahndirektion Ludwigshafen (Railway division of Ludwigshafen) in 1922. After the extension of the Eis Valley Railway (Eistalbahn), which was opened from Grünstadt to Eisenberg (Pfalz) in 1876, to Enkenbach in 1932, some of its trains ran over the connecting line to Kaiserslautern. During the dissolution of the railway division of Ludwigshafen, the Kaiserslautern–Eselsfürth section was transferred to the responsibility of the railway division of Saarbrücken on 1 April 1937, while the rest of the line was taken over by the railway division of Mainz.

=== Recent past ===
After the Second World War, Deutsche Bundesbahn (DB) integrated the railway into the railway division of Mainz, which was assigned all the railway lines within the newly created state of Rhineland-Palatinate. DB received financial support from the federal government, which aimed to maintain the line for strategic reasons within the context of the Cold War. On 1 August 1971, the line came within the sphere of responsibility of Saarbrücken during the dissolution of the railway division of Mainz.

Passenger traffic on the line ceased on 29 May 1987. Military considerations prevented a total closure. A year later, after the train crash in the Heiligenberg Tunnel on the Mannheim–Saarbrücken railway and its closure between Kaiserslautern and Hochspeyer for about three days, it served as a diversion route for the trains of the Alsenz Valley Railway and for some trains on the trunk line from Saarbrücken to Mannheim. The latter trains were hauled by a diesel locomotive that was attached in Kaiserslautern in front of the electric locomotive and had to reverse in both Enkenbach and Hochspeyer, in order to subsequently follow their regular route.

On 1 June 1997, the line was reactivated for passenger operations in order to save trains running on the Alsenz Valley Railway to or from Kaiserslautern having to make the detour via Hochspeyer. However, the two intermediate stations have not been served since then.

== Route ==
The route begins at Kaiserslauter Hauptbahnhof and runs next to the Mannheim–Saarbrücken railway to the east and then turns northwards. It crosses federal highway 37 and reaches Kaiserslautern Nord station. This is followed by a turn to the north-east and it crosses the A6 and runs parallel to the Eselsbach stream to Eselsfürth station. A few kilometres further east, it reaches the southern edge of the residential area of Enkenbach. It passes through the watershed between the Lauter and the Alsenz and ends shortly after crossing federal highway 48. It joins the Alsenz Valley Railway coming from Hochspeyer to run to Enkenbach station.

== Operations ==
The last express trains to use the line ran in 1985. These ran from Paris via the Alsenz Valley Railway and Mainz to Frankfurt.

== Operating points ==
=== Kaiserslautern Hauptbahnhof ===
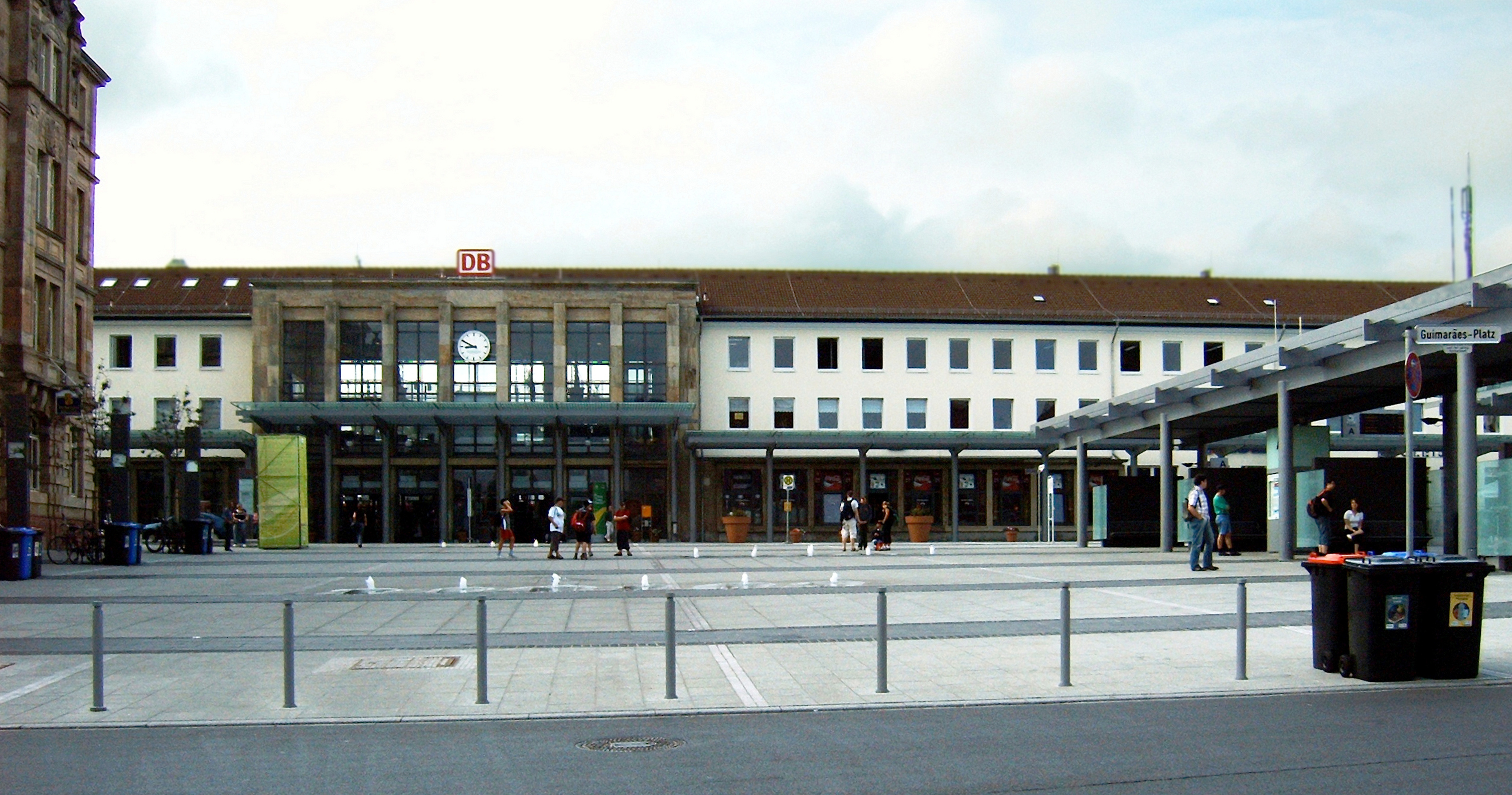
Kaiserslautern Hbf., starting point of the Kaiserslautern–Enkenbach railway

The station was opened on 1 July 1848 with the opening of the Homburg–Kaiserslautern section of the Palatine Ludwig Railway. Half a year later the line was extended to Frankenstein and in 1849 the whole route from Rheinschanze (now Ludwigshafen) to Bexbach was open to traffic. In spite of its great importance, it was not until 1875 that it became a railway junction with the opening of the Kaiserslautern–Enkenbach railway. It gained additional importance with the opening of the Lauter Valley Railway in 1883 and the completion of the Biebermühl Railway to Pirmasens in 1913.

=== Kaiserslautern Nord ===
The station was on the north-eastern outskirts. The entrance building was built of red sandstone and was thus typical of buildings of the Palatine Northern Railways Company. It had been abandoned even before the temporary cessation of the passenger traffic and it is still not served by passenger trains.

=== Eselsfürth ===
The station is located in the Eselsfürth settlement, which is part of Kaiserslautern. The station has a mechanical signal box, which was put into operation in 1938 and is now out of service. The entrance building was also built in the 1930s. No passenger trains stop at this station. A siding connects to a US barracks.

=== Fröhnerhof ===
Little is known about the Fröhnerhof operating point. It was used from the 1940s until 29 May 1976. The operating point formed a four-way junction on the single-track line.

=== Enkenbach ===
The station is located on the eastern outskirts of Enkenbach. It was opened in 1870 along with the Hochspeyer–Winnweiler section of the Alsenz Valley Railway. With the opening the line to Kaiserslautern it became a railway junction. From 1932 it was the western terminus of the Eis Valley Railway.
