= Hochspeyer station =

Railway station in Hochspeyer, Germany

Hochspeyer
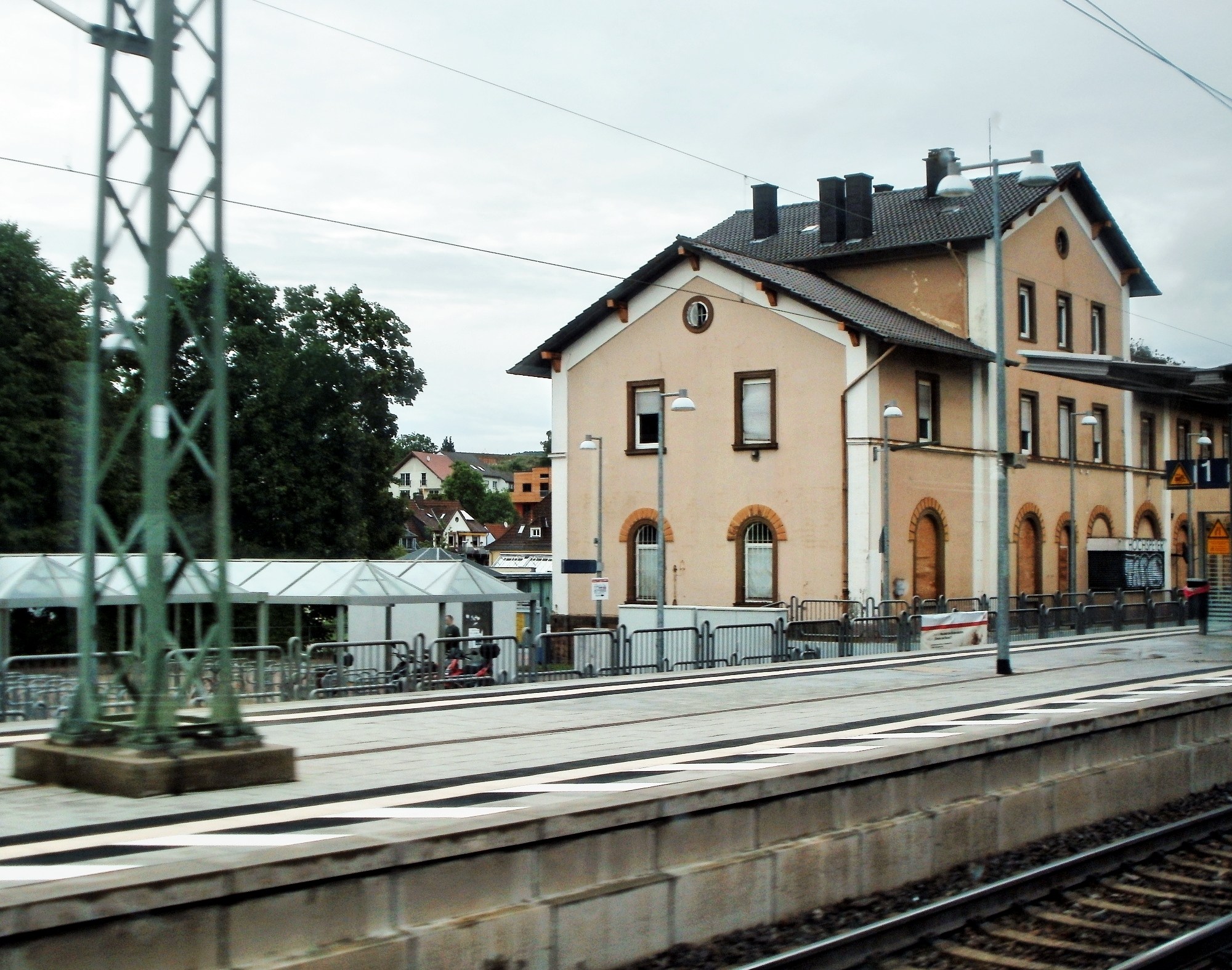
- Former entrance building and one of two current platforms

General information
- Location: Bahnhofstr. 1, Hochspeyer, Rhineland-Palatinate; Germany
- Coordinates: 49°26′39″N 7°54′17″E
- System: Junction station
- Lines: Mannheim–Saarbrücken (km 54.236); Hochspeyer–Bad Münster (km –0.2)
- Platforms: 4

Other information
- Station code: 2805
- DS100 code: SHY
- IBNR: 8002875
- Category: 4
- Fare zone: VRN: 100
- Website: www.bahnhof.de

History
- Opened: 29 October 1870
- Former names: Neuhochspeyer; Neu-Hochspeyer
Location

Hochspeyer station – originally officially Neuhochspeyer or Neu-Hochspeyer – is the station of the town of Hochspeyer in the German state of Rhineland-Palatinate. Deutsche Bahn classifies it as belonging to category 4 and it has four platform tracks. The station is located in the network of the Verkehrsverbund Rhein-Neckar (Rhine-Neckar transport association, VRN) and belongs to fare zone 100. Its address is Bahnhofstraße 1.

It is located on the Mannheim–Saarbrücken railway, which essentially consists of the Palatine Ludwig Railway (Pfälzische Ludwigsbahn, Ludwigshafen–Bexbach). It became a junction station on 29 October 1870, with the opening of the Alsenz Valley Railway (Alsenztalbahn) to Winnweiler; half a year later this line was extended to Bad Münster. The importance of this line, however, fell with the opening of Kaiserslautern–Enkenbach railway a few years later. Since December 2003, it has also been a stop for lines S1 and S2 of the Rhine-Neckar S-Bahn.

== Location ==
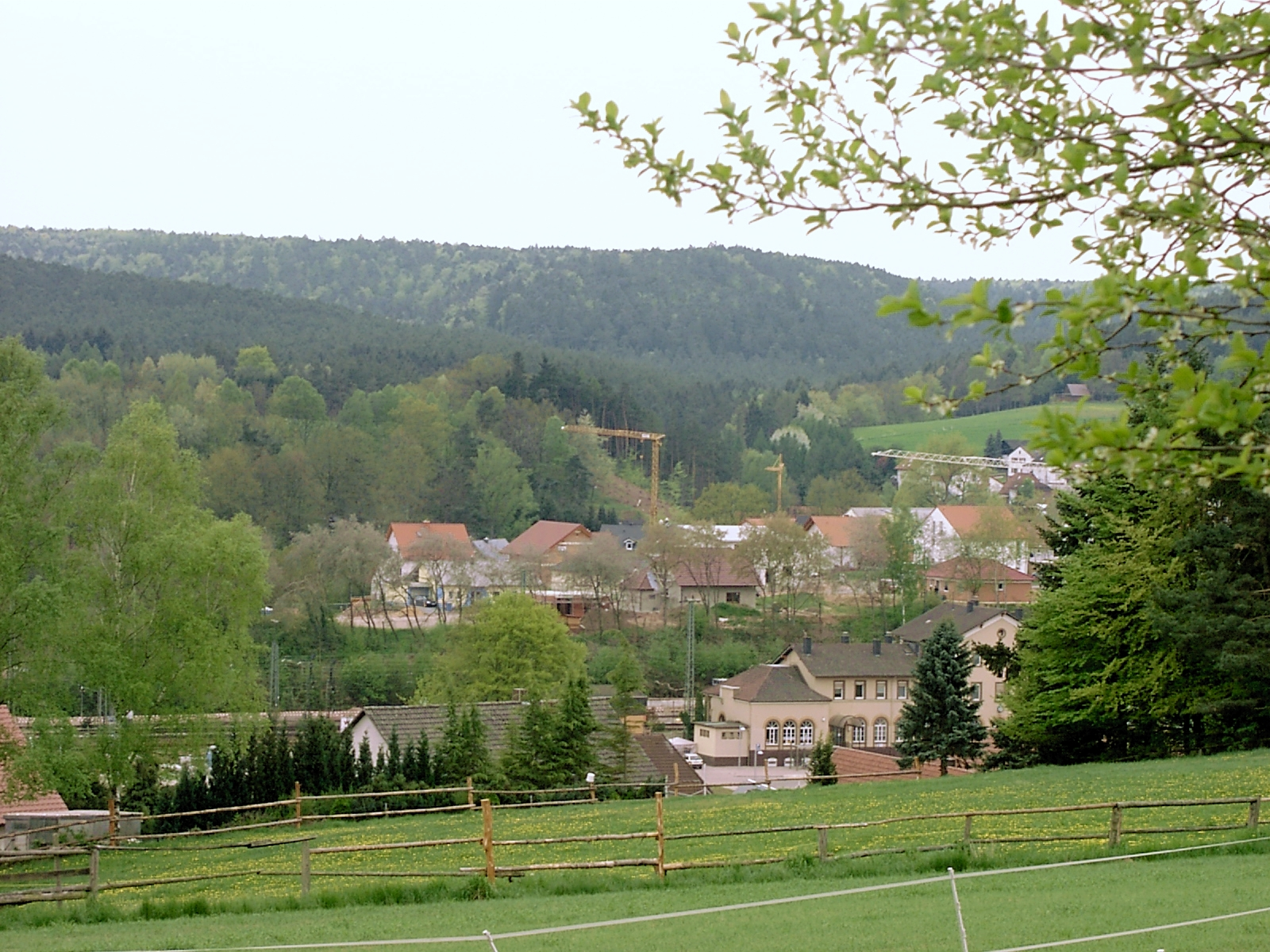
Hochspeyer station (to the right in the photo) from the north

The station is located on the eastern outskirts of Hochspeyer. The Hochspeyerbach and federal highway 48 run north of it and almost parallel. Bahnhofstraße ("station street") branches off from the latter and ends a little later at the station. The Mannheim–Saarbrücken railway runs through the village in the east–west direction. The Alsenz Valley Railway branches off to the northeast to Enkenbach as a single track. The station itself is at line-kilometre 54.236. The zero point for the line-kilometre calculation is between Bexbach and Neunkirchen on the former Bavarian–Prussian national border on what is now part of the Homburg–Neunkirchen railway, although different chainages are now used on that line.

== History ==
Although the selected route for the Palatine Ludwig Railway passed through Kaiserslautern and thus also through Hochspeyer from early in its planning, initially no station was envisaged for Hochspeyer. The then mayor Wilhelm Ritter convinced the Palatine Ludwig Railway Company (Pfalzische Ludwigsbahn-Gesellschaft) of its merits, so that finally a station was developed on the western outskirts. Around 1860, there were initial efforts to build a railway line along the Alsenz. This would have been used in combination with the Palatine Maximilian Railway (Pfälzische Maximiliansbahn, now forming parts of the Neustadt–Wissembourg railway and the Winden–Karlsruhe railway) and the section of the Ludwig Railway directly west of Neustadt as a through route in the north–south direction. The engineers rejected plans for the railway line to run via Otterberg and recommended a route through Enkenbach, which would connect to the Ludwig Railway to the east of Hochspeyer towards Neustadt. A connecting curve to Hochspeyer was built to the south of Fischbach to allow through train to run to Kaiserslautern. A new Hochspeyer station was built to the east of its built-up area. The Hochspeyer–Winnweiler section was opened on 29 October 1870 and on 16 May of the following year it was extended to Münster am Stein.

The station, which had existed since 1848, now operated exclusively as a freight depot and was given the new name of Alt-Hochspeyer (old Hochspeyer). The newly created junction station was called Neuhochspeyer or Neu-Hochspeyer (both meaning "new Hochspeyer") by the railway company at different times. However, since this caused confusion, it was permanently changed to Hochspeyer. The connection via Hochspeyer was an indirect route to Kaiserslautern. On its initiative, therefore, the Kaiserslautern–Enkenbach railway was built, which meant that Hochspeyer station lost its importance as a junction station. At the beginning of the 20th century, the station came under the management of the Betriebs- und Bauinspektion Kaiserslautern I ("operations and construction inspectorate Kaiserslautern I"). The station was also the location of a Bahnmeisterei (track master's office), which was responsible for the maintenance of the railway along the east–west route almost as far as Frankenstein and including the Heiligenberg Tunnel and the Franzosenwoog Tunnel. Its responsibilities extended over the Alsenz Valley Railway almost to Enkenbach.

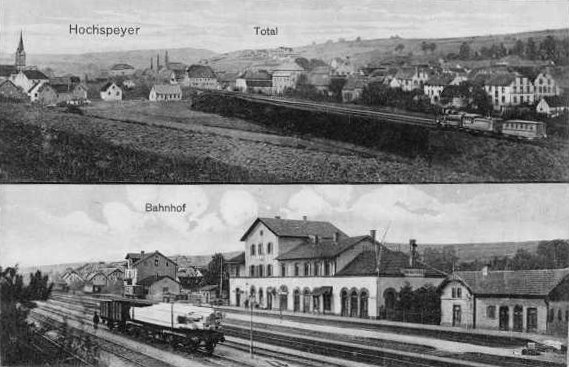
Hochspeyer station (below) in 1921

In 1922, the station was integrated into the newly founded Reichsbahndirektion Ludwigshafen (railway division of Ludwigshafen). During the dissolution of the railway division of Ludwigshafen on 1 April 1937, it was transferred to the railway division of Mainz. Within that, it was responsible to the Betriebsamt (operations office) of Neustadt.

=== After the Second World War ===
As the Mannheim–Saarbrücken railway has always been of great importance for long-distance traffic, it was gradually electrified, starting in 1960. The Saarbrücken–Homburg section could be electrically operated from 8 March 1960. The Homburg–Kaiserslautern section followed on 18 May 1961 and, on 12 March 1964, the entire length of the route, including Hochspeyer station, was electrically operated. The electrification of the remaining section had been delayed mainly because of the numerous tunnels between Kaiserslautern and Neustadt, which had to be enlarged. The Hochspeyerer Bahnmeisterei has already been incorporated into that of Kaiserslautern. In the course of the gradual dissolution of the railway division of Mainz from 1 August 1971, its counterpart in Saarbrücken took responsibility for the station. A prototype ICE 1 train stopped in the station on 20 December 1985. On 28 June 1988 there was a train crash in Heiligenberg Tunnel, as an express train collided with an on-coming freight train. The two locomotives of both trains were demolished and an affected UIC-X wagon was for some time abandoned on a siding in Hochspeyer. A few months later, the locomotives were dismantled on site.

Since 1996 the station has been in the area covered by the Verkehrsverbundes Rhein-Neckar (Rhine-Neckar transport association, VRN). From 2000 to 2006, it belonged to the Westpfalz-Verkehrsverbund (Western Palatinate transport association, WVV). The platforms were upgraded during the integration of the Mannheim–Saarbrücken railway to Kaiserslautern into the network of the Rhine-Neckar S-Bahn. The S-Bahn network was established on 14 December 2003 and the station has since been integrated into it. Deutsche Bahn renewed the station points from 2 to 13 August 2013, mainly at night and on weekends.

== Infrastructure ==
=== Entrance buildings, outbuildings and signal boxes ===
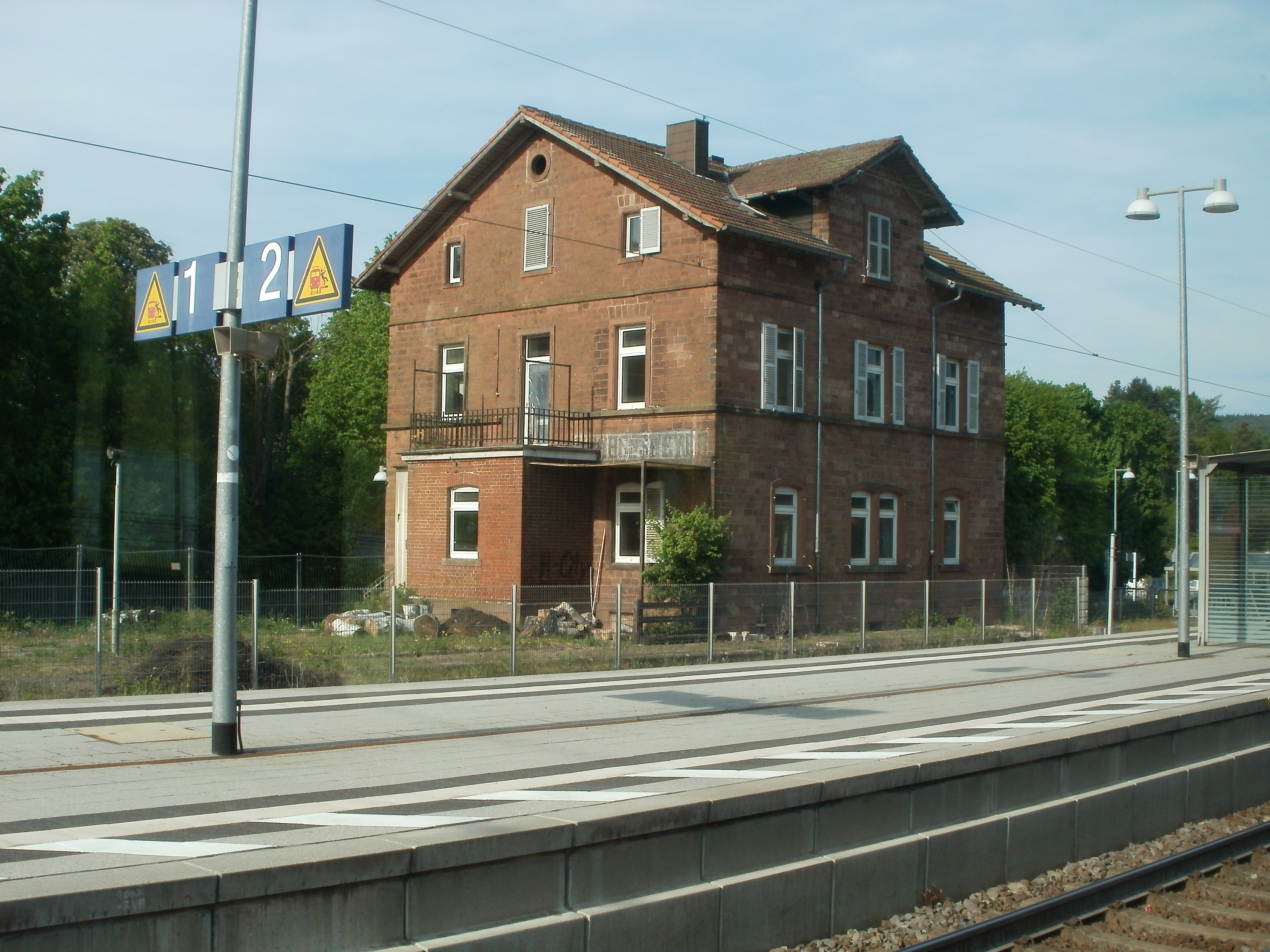
Former auxiliary building in the western railway station area

Like all other station buildings built in the Palatinate around 1870, the entrance building was built in the neoclassical style. So it resembles Albersweiler and Langmeil stations. It was comparatively large and is now disused. Just west of it is a former auxiliary building made out of sandstone. Several signal boxes were abandoned after the Second World War. That at the overpass over federal highway 48 was renovated and converted into a restaurant. This was built during the period of Deutsche Reichsbahn and consists of natural sandstone. The roof is made of natural slate.

Since the 1970s, the station has received colour-light signals as well as a type 60 Relay interlocking (operated with push-buttons on a track-plan, Spurplandrucktastenstellwerk) from Standard Elektrik Lorenz (now part of Nokia), which remained in use unlike many of the other operations. It was taken out of operation at the end of April 2007; so the local controller was no longer required and the station is now remotely controlled. Since then, the station has been controlled by the electronic interlocking in Neustadt, which in turn is controlled by the Betriebszentrale Karlsruhe (Karlsruhe Operations Centre).

=== Installations ===
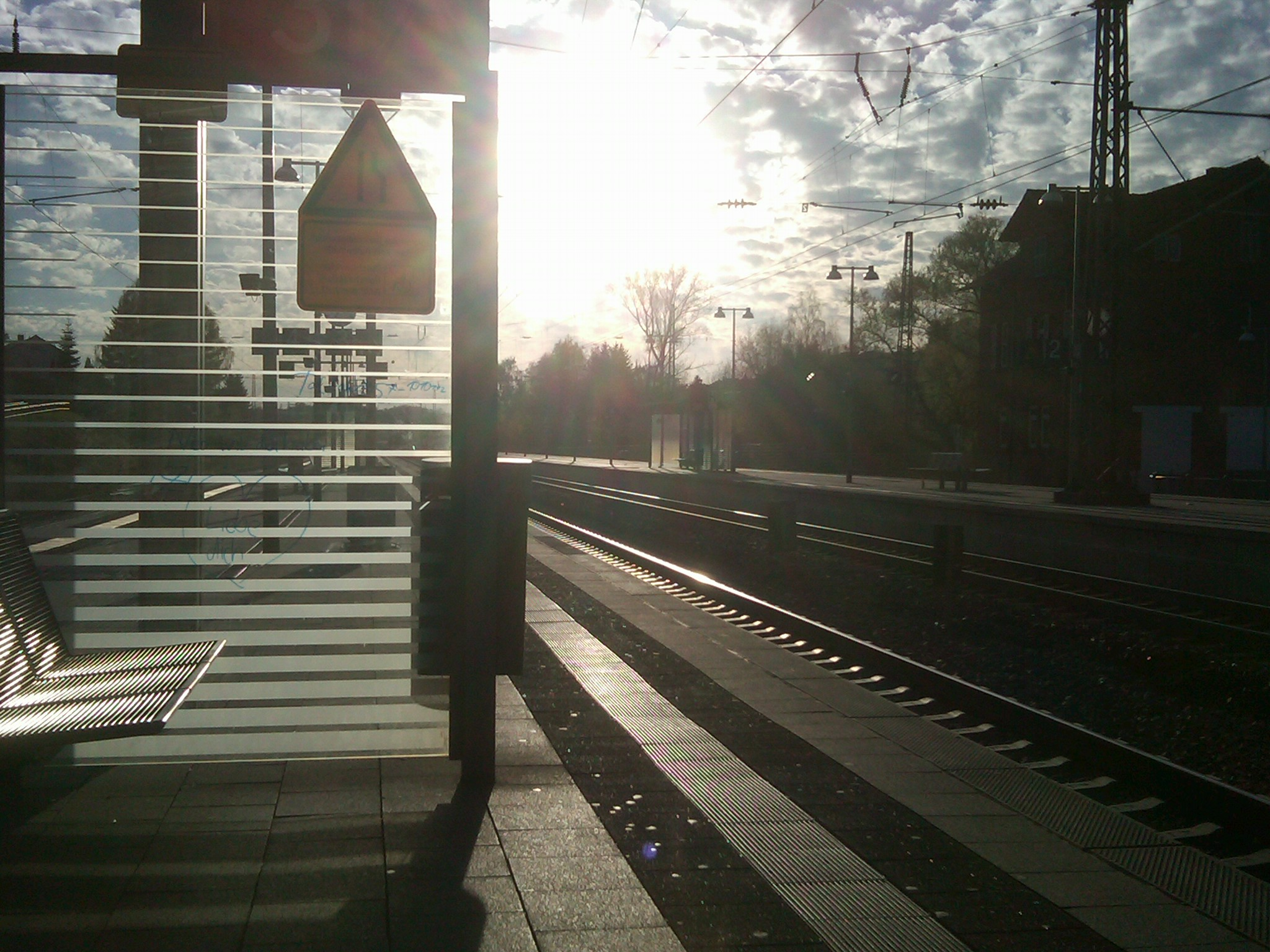
View of platforms 2 and 3

In the southern area, the station had several freight and storage sidings until the 1990s. In addition, in the past there was a "house" platform (next to the station building) and its track, both of which have disappeared however with the use of the entrance building for railway operations. Currently it has four platform faces. Platforms 2 and 3 serve as through tracks. The platform was modernised in the course of the integration of the station into the network of the Rhine-Neckar S-Bahn. There are two different entry heights on platform 3 and 4. On platform 1 is a through track and a siding for a fire engine that has been adapted so that it can run on rails in order to fight fires in the Heiligenberg Tunnel.

In addition, about one kilometre further east of the station, there is a part of the station designated as Hochspeyer Ost (abbreviated SHY-O), from which a connection curve branches off from Neustadt to the Alsenz Valley Railway. The latter used to serve long-distance trains on the Bingerbrück–Neustadt route and is now rarely used. There is also the station part on the Alsenz Valley Railway designated as Hochspeyer-Nord (SHY-N), which is located in the municipality of Fischbach and where the connecting curve from the Alsenz line meets the line from Kaiserslautern.

Platforms
Platform	Usable length	Platform height	Current use
1	220 m	76 cm	Trains towards Kaiserslautern and Enkenbach
2	205 m	76 cm	Trains towards Kaiserslautern and Enkenbach
3	220/38 m	76/38 cm	Trains towards Neustadt and Enkenbach
4	220/38 m	76/38 cm	Rarely used

== Operations ==
=== Passenger services ===
In 1871, the journey time from Hochspeyer station to Kaiserslautern lasted between 17 and 19 minutes for passenger trains and to Neustadt it took at least three-quarters of an hour. In 1884, local trains ran primarily on the Neunkirchen–Worms route. In addition, there were trains that only included sections such as Neustadt–Kaiserslautern and Kaiserslautern–Worms. Some of them did not stop at all the subway stations, and Hochspeyer was not approached by all local trains. The trains of the Alsenz Valley Railway ran in the summer of 1914 on the Bad Münster–Neustadt route, reversing in Hochspeyer. In 1944, not all trains ran from the Alsenz Valley Railway to Hochspeyer; some ran from Enkenbach via the connecting line to Kaiserslautern instead. Similarly some services ran on the Hochspeyer–Langmeil route. Most of the local services on the Mannheim–Saarbrücken railway during this time only ran on sections of it. Running to the west, they generally reached only as far as Homburg.

The station is served by S-Bahn services on line S1 (Homburg–Osterburken) and S2 (Kaiserslautern–Mosbach), both running hourly, which results in a half-cycle between Kaiserslautern and Mosbach. Some services of the Alsenz Valley railway (RB 65) do not run directly from Kaiserslautern to Enkenbach on the Kaiserslautern–Enkenbach railway, but take a small detour and stop in Hochspeyer. Furthermore, individual Regional-Express and Regionalbahn services from Karlsruhe/Neustadt to Kaiserslautern stop in Hochspeyer in the peaks. Since 2005, services have run on Sundays and public holidays from May to October from Hochspeyer via the Zeller Valley Railway to Worms.

Services in the 2017 timetable
Train service	Route	Interval
S1	Homburg (Saar) – Kaiserslautern – Hochspeyer – Neustadt (Weinstr) – Mannheim – Heidelberg – Eberbach – Mosbach (Baden) –Osterburken	Hourly
S2	Kaiserslautern – Hochspeyer – Neustadt (Weinstr) – Mannheim – Heidelberg – Eberbach – Mosbach (Baden)	Hourly
RB 65	Kaiserslautern – (Hochspeyer –) Enkenbach – Rockenhausen – Bad Münster a Stein – Bad Kreuznach – Langenlonsheim – Bingen (Rhein)	Individual services
RE 6	Karlsruhe – Wörth (Rhein) – Winden (Pfalz) – Landau (Pfalz) – Neustadt (Weinstr) – Lambrecht (Pfalz) – Hochspeyer – Kaiserslautern	Individual services
RB	Neustadt-Böbig – Neustadt (Weinstr) – Lambrecht (Pfalz) – Hochspeyer – Kaiserslautern	Individual service

=== Freight traffic ===
In 1871, normal freight trains on the Ludwigs Railway stopped between three and five minutes at the station. These were on the Kaiserslautern–Mainz, Homburg–Frankenthal. Ludwigshafen–Neunkirchen and Worms–Homburg lines. In addition there was a stone train of the Kaiserslautern–Ludwigshafen route. This and the coal trains stopped at the station between two and three minutes. A freight train ran on the Kaiserslautern–Münster route over the Alsenz Valley Railway. In addition, there was a so-called "supplemental freight train" that stopped at only the stations of Enkenbach, Winnweiler, Rockenhausen, Alsenz and Ebernburg between Kaiserslautern and Münster. The stay in the station running north was ten minutes and in the opposite direction 15 minutes. At the beginning of the twentieth century, freight trains running on the Ludwigshafen–Kaiserslautern, Kaiserslautern–Bingerbrück and Marnheim–Neustadt–Kaiserslautern routes stopped at the station. In the 1970s, Hochspeyer was a stop on the Einsiedlerhof–Enkenbach–Grünstadt route. However, freight operations at the station have been abandoned.

=== Car parking, buses, cycling and hiking ===
The station has car parking, bicycle parking and bus services. There is a bus stop in the northern part of the station. It is served by two bus routes, one of which runs to Kaiserslautern and one to Enkenbach and Otterberg. In addition, a hiking bus runs from the station to sightseeing destinations in the catchment area of Hochspeyer, which is marketed as Fuchsbus ("fox bus"). In addition, the station is the starting point of Tour 4 of the Palatine Forest Mountain Bike Park (Mountainbikepark Pfälzerwald). The Nahegau–Wasgau–Vogesen long distance path, which is marked with a white cross, also passes the station and forms the alternative southern route of the E8 European long distance path.

== Sources ==
=== Further reading ===
- Franz Neumer (1999). Vor 150 Jahren fuhr die erste Eisenbahn durch Hochspeyer (in German). Heimatjahrbuch des Landkreises Kaiserslautern 1999. pp. 116–118.
