= Lambrecht (Pfalz) station =

Railway station in Lambrecht, Germany

Lambrecht (Pfalz)
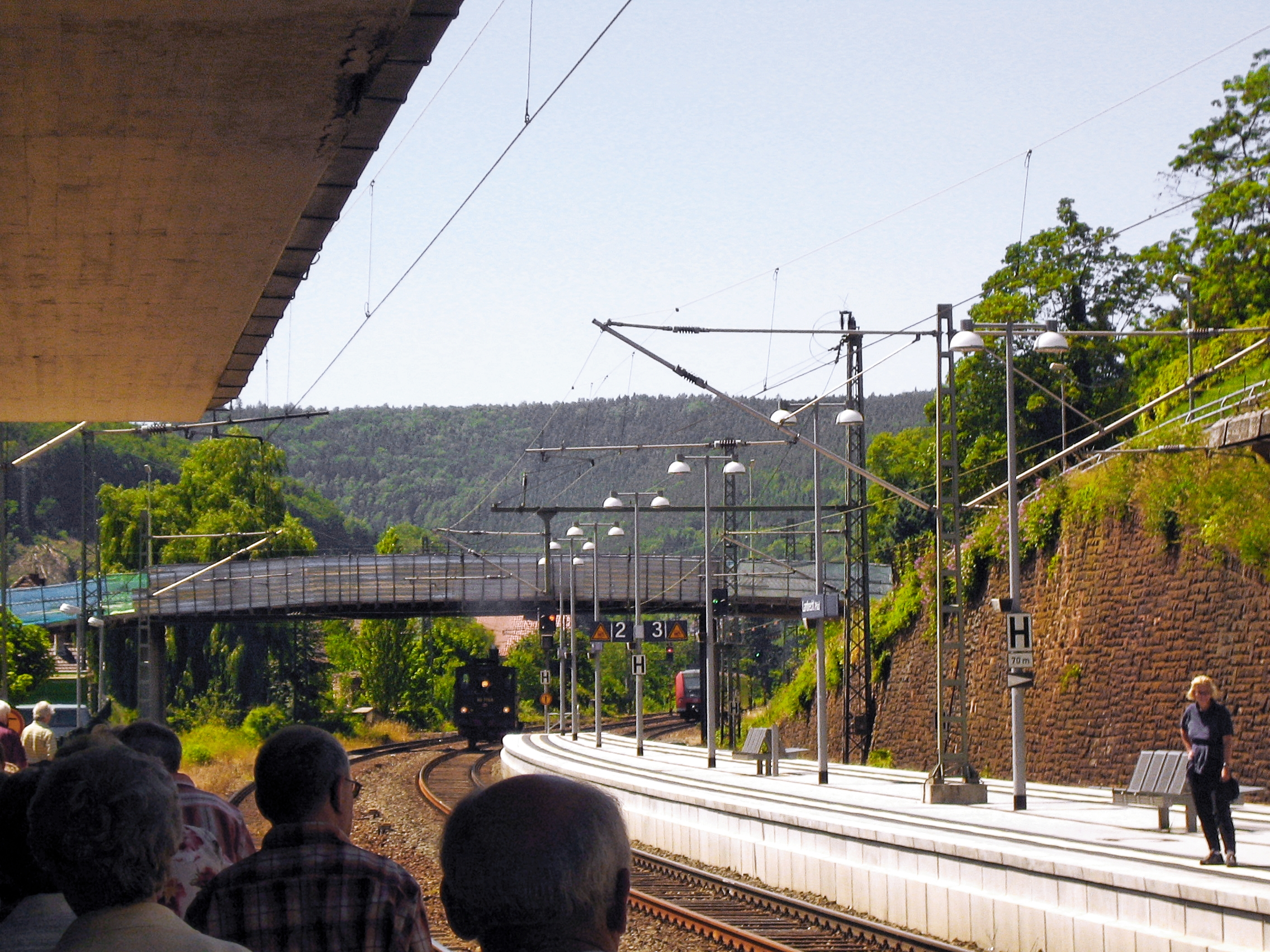
- Lambrecht station in 2005

General information
- Location: Bahnhofstr. 4, Lambrecht, Rhineland-Palatinate; Germany
- Coordinates: 49°22′24″N 8°04′28″E
- Lines: Mannheim–Saarbrücken (km 70.75) (KBS 670); Lambrecht (Pfalz)–Elmstein (km 0.00) (12670)
- Platforms: 3

Construction
- Accessible: Yes
- Architectural style: Neoclassical

Other information
- Station code: 3497
- DS100 code: RLBP
- IBNR: 8003497
- Category: 4
- Fare zone: VRN: 121
- Website: www.bahnhof.de

History
- Opened: 25 August 1849
Location

Lambrecht (Pfalz) station is the station of the town of Lambrecht in the German state of Rhineland-Palatinate. Deutsche Bahn classifies it as belonging to category 4 and it has three platform tracks. The station is located in the network of the Verkehrsverbund Rhein-Neckar (Rhine-Neckar transport association, VRN) and belongs to fare zone 121. Its address is Bahnhofstraße 4.

It is located on the Mannheim–Saarbrücken railway, which essentially consists of the Palatine Ludwig Railway (Pfälzische Ludwigsbahn, Ludwigshafen–Bexbach). It was opened on 25 August 1849, when the Ludwig Railway was put into full operation. In 1902 an industrial track was built to Sattelmühle and it was extended as a branch railway (called the Kuckucksbähnel—Little Cuckoo Railway) to Elmstein and fully opened in 1909. This carried normal passenger services up until 1960 and was reopened as a heritage railway in 1984.

== Location ==
The station is located on the northern outskirts of the town and is surrounded by sandstone formations. Bahnhofstraße (station street) runs immediately south – approximately parallel to the tracks – and continues through a long S-curve into Hauptstraße (main street), which is also the route of federal highway 39. To the west, it becomes Sommerbergstraße. The latter bridges the station area and runs back to the east – also approximately parallel to the railway – through a residential area to the north of the railway. The station itself is at line-kilometre 70.752. The zero point for the kilometrage is between Bexbach and Neunkirchen on the former Bavaria–Prussia national border.

The Mannheim–Saarbrücken railway runs from east to west on a slight curve. About a kilometre and a half from the station area, the Little Cuckoo Railway branches off the main line and turns south across the federal highway and runs through the Elmstein valley to Frankeneck.

== History ==
=== Planning, construction and opening (1835–1849) ===
Originally it had been planned to build a railway running north–south in the then Bavarian Circle of the Rhine (Rheinkreis). However, it was agreed to first build a railway running east–west, which was to be used primarily for transporting coal from the Saar district (now part of the Saarland) to the Rhine. Two options were discussed for the general route through Kaiserslautern, as the development of a route through the Palatinate Forest (Pfälzerwald) proved to be complicated. At first the responsible engineers considered a route through the Dürkheim valley. However, this proved impractical because its side valleys were too low, and above all the climb to Frankenstein would have been too steep. This would have required stationary steam engines and rope haulage to overcome the differences in altitude. For this reason, they chose an option through the Neustadt valley, which would also be difficult to climb according to expert opinion, but this would be feasible and, in contrast to the Dürkheim valley, would avoid the need for stationary steam engines. A station would also be built in the then St. Lambrecht-Grevenhausen – called Lambrecht from 1887.

After the construction of the Palatine Ludwig Railway route from Rheinschanze to Bexbach had been approved, the Ludwigshafen (formerly Rheinschanze)–Neustadt section was opened on 11 June 1847. Operations were also possible from Homburg to Frankenstein from 2 December of the following year. Completion of the Neustadt–Frankenstein section was delayed by difficulties in acquiring land needed for the construction and the need to overcome difficult topography. For example, ten tunnels had to be built through hills and foothills. The opening ceremony finally took place on 25 August 1849. Previously, stagecoaches ran between the two completed parts of the line. Lambrecht station was opened along with Weidenthal as an intermediate station on the last section.

=== Further development and the opening of the Little Cuckoo Railway ===
In the 1880s, there were first efforts to improve transport links with the neighbouring Elmstein valley (Elmsteiner Tal). However, plans to build a tramway from Neustadt via Lambrecht to Elmstein did not proceed. The Bavarian government accepted a bill which would have allowed the construction of branch lines in the Palatinate on 5 April 1892; this would have granted interest rate guarantees for certain routes. During this time, the construction of a branch line from Lambrecht to Elmstein was also discussed by Andreas Deinhard in the Chamber of Deputies. With the gradual demise of timber rafting at the end of the 19th century, the main source of livelihood in the Elmstein Valley was threatened and the population was forced to find other sources of income. Those affected saw the solution to the problem as a railway link that would act as a replacement for the transportation of wood using timber rafts. In addition the planned line was seen as a way of stimulating the economy of the valley.

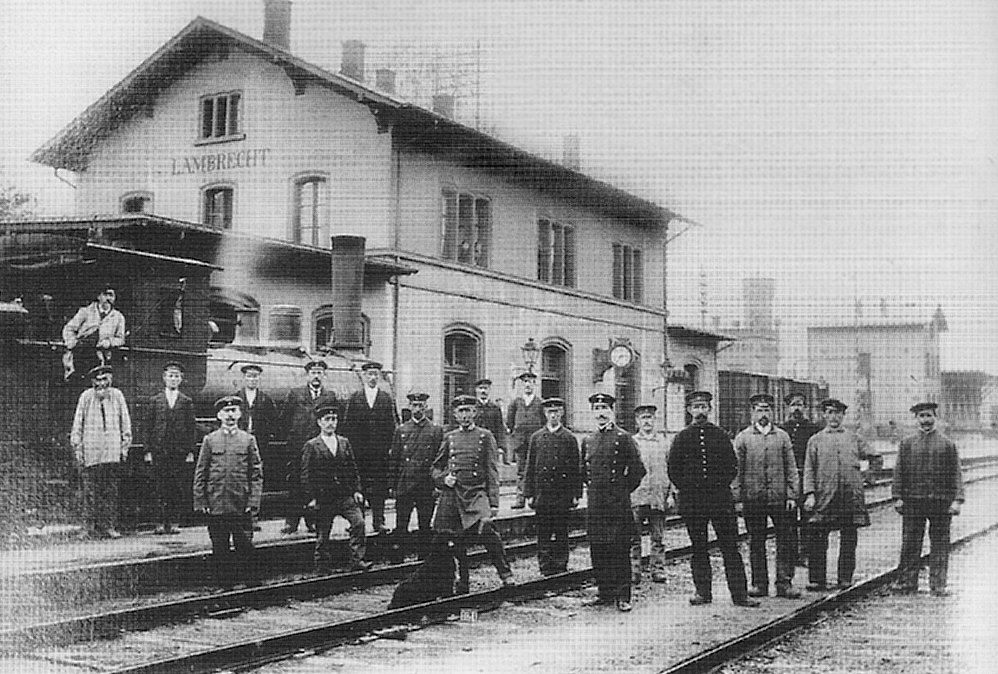
Station about 1900

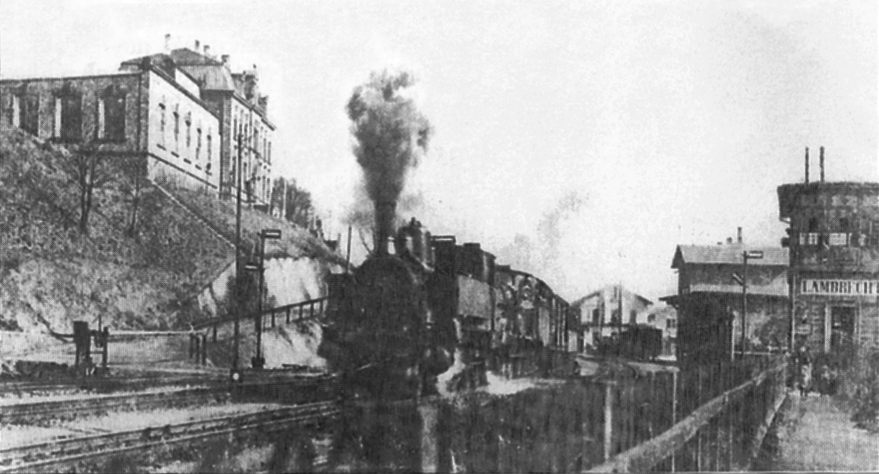
Express train passing through the station

In 1902, an industrial siding was opened via Frankeneck to the hamlet of Sattelmühle as a stage towards building a line to Elmstein. Finally, the Little Cuckoo Railway running up to Elmstein was opened on 23 January 1909. The train that was expected to make the opening trip from Elmstein, however, was involved in an accident, and had to be replaced by a train from Lambrecht.

At the beginning of the twentieth century, the station had ticket gates like other stations in the Palatinate. During this time, the station was managed by the operations and construction inspectorate (Betriebs- und Bauinspektion) of Neustadt an der Haardt and was the site of a Bahnmeisterei (office of the supervisor of track maintenance). The Königliche Eisenbahndirektion (Royal railway division of Ludwigshafen, which was established when the Palatine Ludwig Railway Company (Pfälzische Ludwigsbahn-Gesellschaft) was taken over by the Royal Bavarian State Railways (Königliche Bayerische Staats-Eisenbahnen) in 1909, became the Reichsbahndirektion (Reichsbahn division) of Ludwigshafen after the founding of the Deutsche Reichsbahn in 1922. A year later, the railway workers employed at the railway station were expelled during the operation of the railway by the French military during the occupation of the Palatinate by France. They then returned to work. During the dissolution of the railway division of Ludwigshafen on 1 April 1936, it was transferred to the railway division of Mainz and the Betriebsamtes (RBA) Neustadt (operations office of Neustadt).

In the course of the combat operations during the Second World War, the station building was destroyed in March 1945 by a fire, which was fought by foreign forced labourers. As a result, a barracks, which had previously been used by the Wehrmacht to accommodate horses, had to assume its function.

=== Deutsche Bundesbahn and Deutsche Bahn ===
In 1949, the newly founded Deutsche Bundesbahn (DB) transferred the station to the Bundesbahndirektion Mainz (Bundesbahn railway division of Mainz), which was assigned all railway lines within the newly created state of Rhineland-Palatinate. The new entrance building was opened on 5 June 1957. Regular passenger services ended as early as 1960 on the Little Cuckoo Railway. Due to the thin population of the area, it was mainly useful for freight traffic; passenger traffic had always been minor. Since the main line from Mannheim had always had a great significance for long-distance traffic to Saarbrücken, it was gradually electrified, starting in 1960. The Saarbrücken–Homburg section could be operated electrically on 8 March 1960. The Homburg–Kaiserslautern followed on 18 May 1961 and from 12 March 1964 the entire line, including Lambrecht station, was electrically operated. The electrification of the remaining section was delayed mainly because of the numerous tunnels between Kaiserslautern and Neustadt that had to be enlarged. On 1 August 1971, the station came under the jurisdiction of the railway division of Karlsruhe with the dissolution of the railway division of Mainz. At the same time the platforms were raised. The last scheduled freight train south of Frankeneck operated on the Cuckoo Railway on 30 June 1976. A year later the traffic on it was officially abandoned. In the last years of operations, the branch was officially designated as only a siding of Lambrecht station. From the mid-1970s onwards, Frankeneck station, which was located on the branch, was officially designated as a part of Lambrecht station. Since 1984, the branch line has been operated as a heritage railway. Since 1990, the station has been part of the Verkehrsverbund Rhein-Neckar (Rhine-Neckar transport association, VRN).

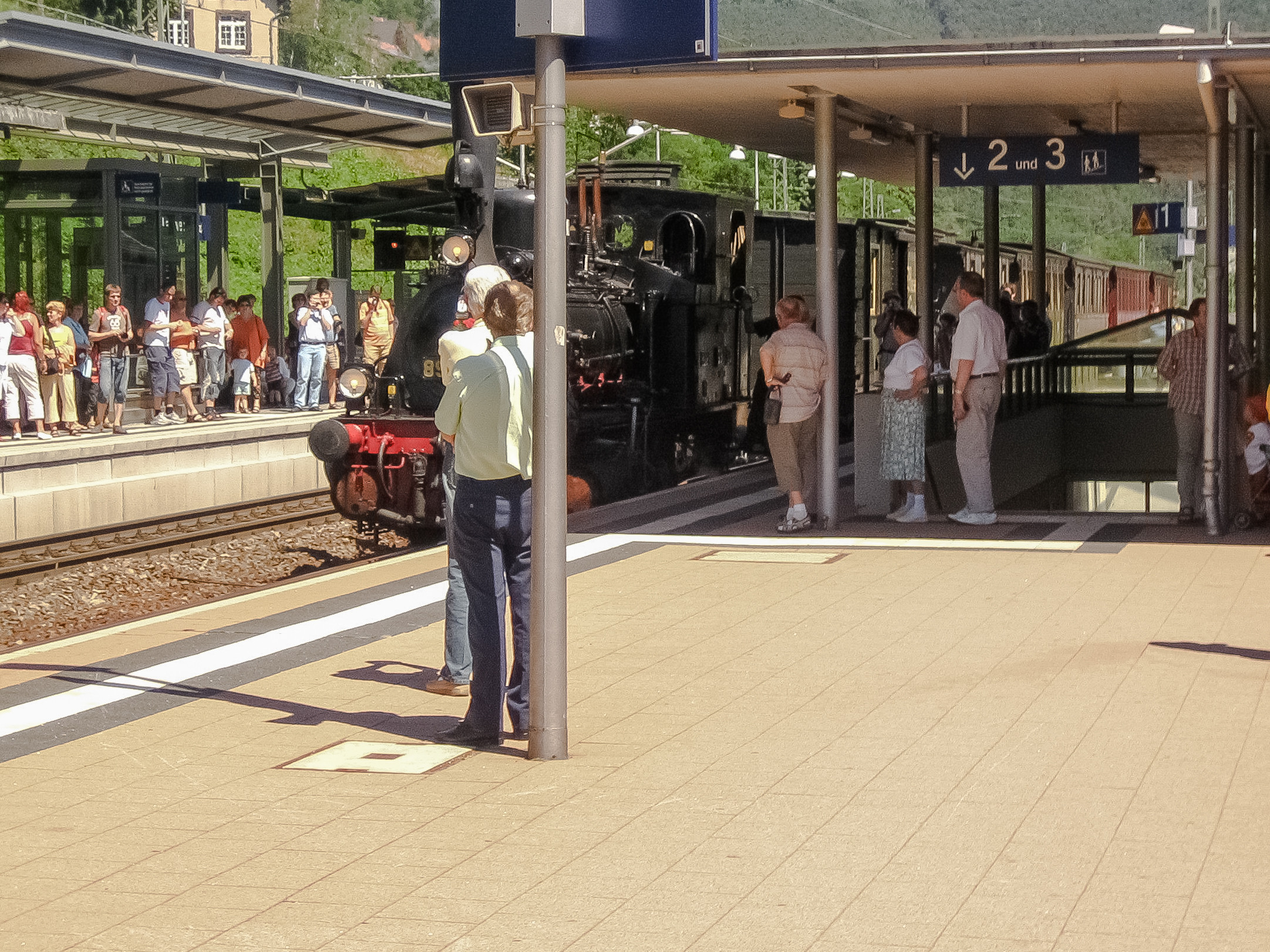
Train of the Cuckoo Railway on platform 1 in Lambrecht station in 2005

The former freight handling facility, which had last served as a private house, was demolished in 1999 to build a parking area. On 16 May of the same year, an electronic interlocking was installed in Neustadt, which meant that the station lost its last employee. In addition, DB Netz dismantled more railway tracks, so that since then the station has had three main tracks. The platforms were upgraded in preparation for the integration of the Mannheim-Saarbrücken railway as far as Kaiserslautern into the network of the Rhine-Neckar S-Bahn in 2003. This was carried out by Wieland & Schultz GmbH company on behalf of DB Station&Service. The S-Bahn was opened on 14 December 2003 and Lambrecht station has been integrated in it ever since.

== Infrastructure ==
=== First entrance building ===
The original entrance building was a sandstone building with two floors. It corresponded to the architectural style of the Palatinate, especially for railway stations, in the second half of the 19th century. Its longitudinal axis ran parallel to the tracks. Along the gable and the longitudinal walls, there were three windows on each side per floor. The doors as well as the windows had sandstone frames. On the ground floor there were offices, the ticket counter, a room for the driver, waiting rooms and the express goods and baggage handling room. The latter was moved to a specially built one-storey annex in 1900. On the upper floor were the apartments of the railway officers and the station's board room. The traffic volume had grown only to a limited extent, so that in 1900 an extension was opened for baggage and express goods. In 1907, the goods handling department received a three-storey extension. It was burnt down in the Second World War during military action.

=== Current entrance building ===
The current entrance building was completed in 1957 and is located on the site of its predecessor, but is smaller. The sale of tickets and the handling of express goods and luggage took place on the lower floor. The main entrance and the waiting room were in the middle of the building. There was a restaurant and adjoining rooms in the eastern wing. The upper floor accommodated administrative rooms and the office of the station master. At the beginning of the 1980s, the station was abolished as a separate agency. This was connected with a reconstruction of the station building and the closing of the station restaurant.

=== Signal boxes ===
In the 1880s the Palatinate Railway (Pfälzische Eisenbahnen) built a two two-storey mechanical signal box— then called a Zentralapparate ("central apparatus")—of the Bruchsal G class. One of them was built at the western end of the station and the other on the eastern. In addition to a siding to the timber loading area and the industrial siding to Sattelmühle, there was a third siding branching from the Ludwig Railway. Under Deutsche Reichsbahn, two new mechanical signal boxes were built in 1934 to a single design. The one in the west of the station served as a control box, and the one in the east as a guard box. They were demolished in 1985. They were replaced by a Siemens press button relay interlocking without automatic route-setting (class DrS2), which was located in the entrance building. This functioned as a route-setting system, which was designated as Lf. It has been out of operation Since 1999.

Today the station is controlled by the Neustadt 2 dispatcher of the Neustadt (Weinstraße) control centre, which is supervised by the signalling control centre of Karlsruhe.

=== Track layout and other buildings ===
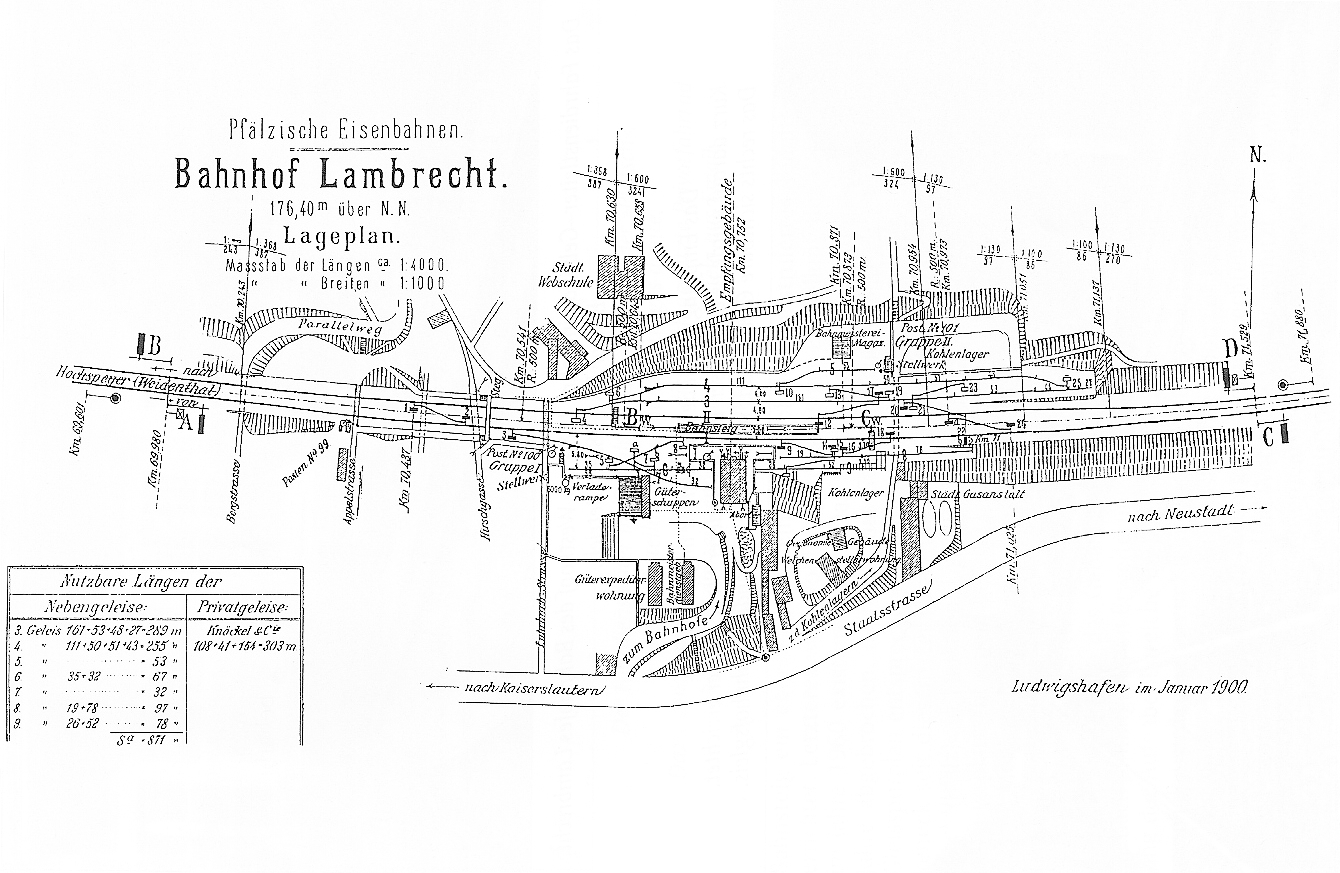
Track layout in about 1900

In 1900, the station had a total of eight tracks. In the south-west area there were several dead-end tracks. Over decades the track layout remained essentially unchanged. At the beginning of the 1960s, during the electrification work, the pedestrian subway, track layout and safety devices were modified. Thus, for example, the island platform between tracks 1 and 2 was replaced by a new island platform between tracks 2 and 3. At the end of the 1980s, the track layout was significantly reduced, so that since then there have been only three tracks. Track 1 next to the station building serves both freight trains as an overtaking track and the trains of the Cuckoo Railway, while tracks 2 and 3 serve the main line.

== Operations ==
=== Passengers ===
Up to 1865, there were no passenger-only trains in local operations, but only mixed trains. These often did not stop at all stations. In 1865, three train pairs on the Worms–Neunkirchen route stopped at the station. Some of the trains ran to Mainz in 1871. They stayed at the station for one minute. In 1884, local trains ran primarily on the Neunkirchen–Worms route. In addition there were trains, which ran only on part of the line such as Neustadt–Kaiserslautern and Kaiserslautern–Worms. Some did not stop at all stations.

At the end of the 1890s, seven trains went to Kaiserslautern and six to Neustadt; another train ran between Neustadt and Lambrecht. In the summer of 1914, the trains on the Alsenz Valley Railway (Alsenztalbahn) ran on the Bad Münster–Neustadt route, requiring a reversal in Hochspeyer station with the locomotive running around the train, and also stopping in Lambrecht. During the First World War and the inter-war period, local transport was largely limited to the Neustadt–Kaiserslautern route. The number of services was also reduced.

In the middle of the Second World War, most local services on the Mannheim–Saarbrücken railway ran only on sections of the line. As a rule, they ran as far west as Homburg at the most. In the post-war period, services were largely limited to the Neustadt–Kaiserslautern section. In 1948 there were six trains on weekdays and on weekends. In addition, three pairs of trains ran over the Cuckoo Railway on working days and two pairs on Sundays. These ran through to Neustadt.

From 1991, trains on the Trier–Offenburg route stopped at all stations to the east of Kaiserslautern and thus also in Lambrecht. A few years later the Homburg–Neckarelz route was added, continuing to Osterburken or Heilbronn. From 2001 onwards the trains that previously ran to Offenburg, largely ran only as far as Karlsruhe.

Trains services in the 2025 timetable
Train type	Route	Interval
S1	Homburg (Saar) – Kaiserslautern – Hochspeyer – Lambrecht (Pfalz) – Neustadt (Weinstr) – Mannheim – Heidelberg –Eberbach – Mosbach (Baden) –Osterburken	Hourly
S2	Kaiserslautern – Hochspeyer – Lambrecht (Pfalz) – Neustadt (Weinstr) – Mannheim – Heidelberg – Eberbach – Mosbach (Baden)	Hourly
S44	Homburg (Saar) – Kaiserslautern – Hochspeyer – Lambrecht (Pfalz) – Neustadt (Weinstr) – Ludwigshafen – Ludwigshafen (Rhein) BASF Nord	Some services on weekdays

=== Freight ===
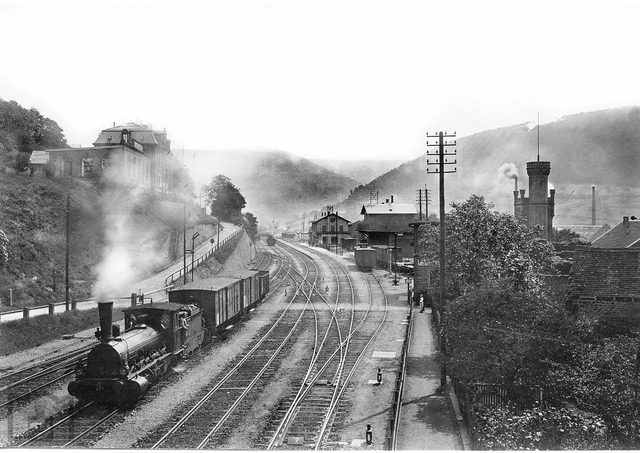
Freight trains about 1900 passing through Lambrecht station

Like all stations along the Ludwig Railway at that time, the station had facilities for handling freight. In 1871, the normal freight trains on the Ludwig Railway on the Kaiserslautern–Mainz, Homburg–Frankenthal, Ludwigshafen–Neunkirchen, Worms–Homburg routes stopped at the station for five minutes. In addition there was a stone train on the Kaiserslautern–Ludwigshafen route, which stopped at the station for a total of three minutes. Coal trains stopped at the station for two minutes, although not all of them served the station.

On 24 December 1881, Palatine Ludwig Railway Company (Pfälzische Ludwigsbahn-Gesellschaft) established a yard for loading timber near the station in order to improve operations. This later developed into Lambrecht freight yard, since Lambrecht station had reached the limits of its capacities and, for reasons of topography, an extension of the track layout was impossible. Frankeneck freight yard was also built at the other end of the track that developed into the Little Cuckoo Railway. In order to get to the freight yard, the trains had to reverse in Frankeneck station, with the locomotive running around the train. The freight yard itself had four main tracks.

From the 1980s onwards Übergabezüge (goods exchange trains) served the station, which at that time no longer had an important market. It was based in Neustadter Hauptbahnhof. In the meantime, the former Frankeneck station, which functions as a part of Lambrecht station, is served by the Little Cuckoo Railway. Freight traffic has now been discontinued.

=== Individual and bus services ===
The station has parking, bicycle parking and a bus connection. There is a bus stop in the southern part of the station. Bus route 517 connects the station to Neustadt an der Weinstraße, Lindenberg, Esthal, Elmstein and Iggelbach. In addition, it is the starting point of Tour 5 of the Palatine Forest Mountain Bike Park and the Geißbockwanderweg (billy goat hiking trail), which runs north via the Palatinate Forest to Deidesheim.
