= Enkenbach station =

Railway station in Enkenbach-Alsenborn, Germany

Enkenbach
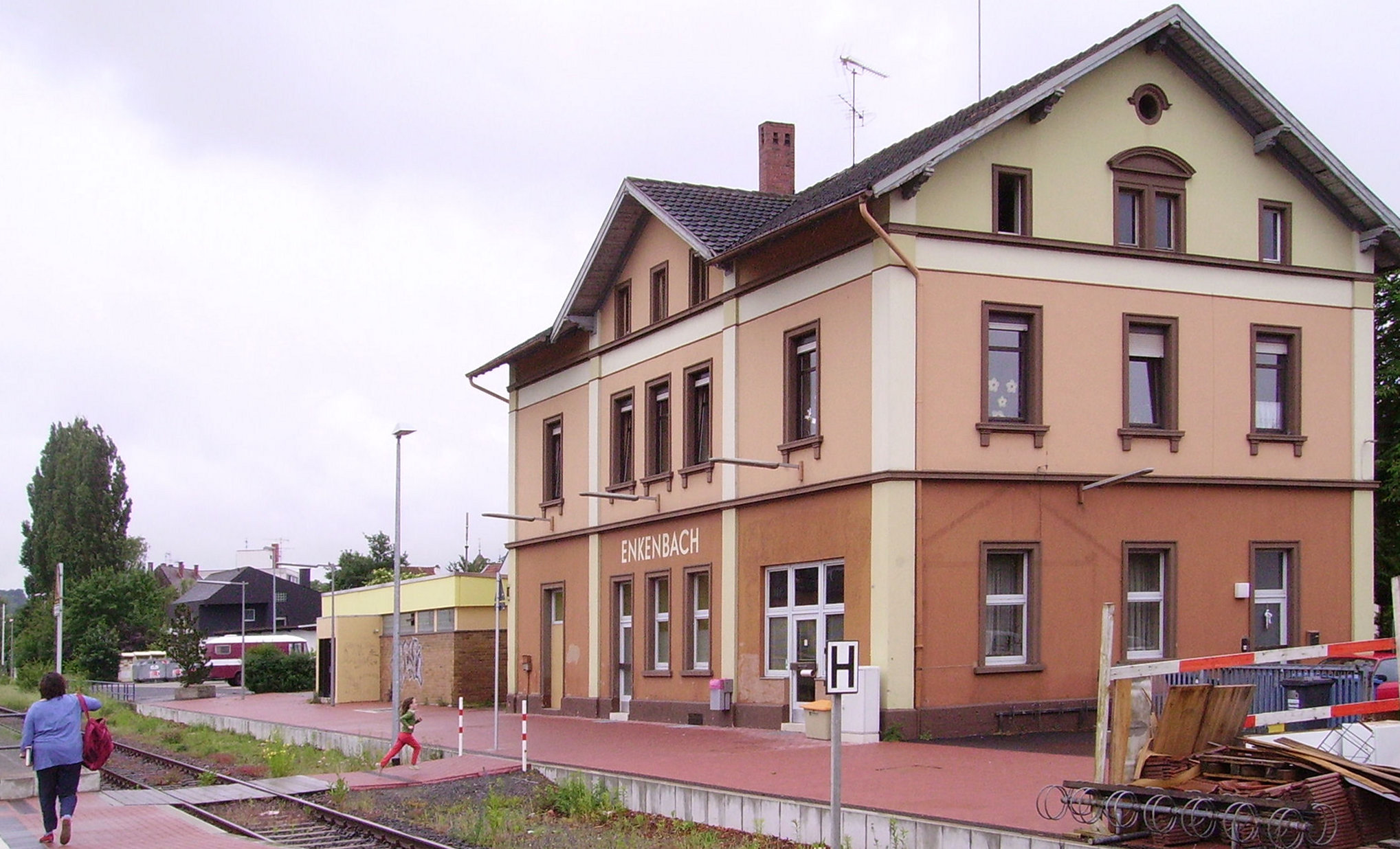
- Station building

General information
- Location: Bahnhofstr. 2, Enkenbach, Enkenbach-Alsenborn, Rhineland-Palatinate; Germany
- Coordinates: 49°29′25″N 7°53′58″E
- System: Junction station
- Lines: Hochspeyer–Bad Münster (km 5.8); Kaiserslautern–Enkenbach (km 13.1); Grünstadt–Enkenbach (km 26.3)
- Platforms: 2

Construction
- Accessible: Yes
- Architectural style: Neoclassical

Other information
- Station code: 1602
- DS100 code: SENK
- IBNR: 8000372
- Category: 6
- Fare zone: VRN: 828
- Website: www.bahnhof.de

History
- Opened: 29 October 1870

Services
Preceding station	Vlexx	Following station
Hochspeyer towards Kaiserslautern Hbf	RE 15	Winnweiler towards Bodenheim
Preceding station	DB Regio Mitte	Following station
Hochspeyer towards Kaiserslautern Hbf	RB 65	Münchweiler (Alsenz) towards Bingen Hbf
Location

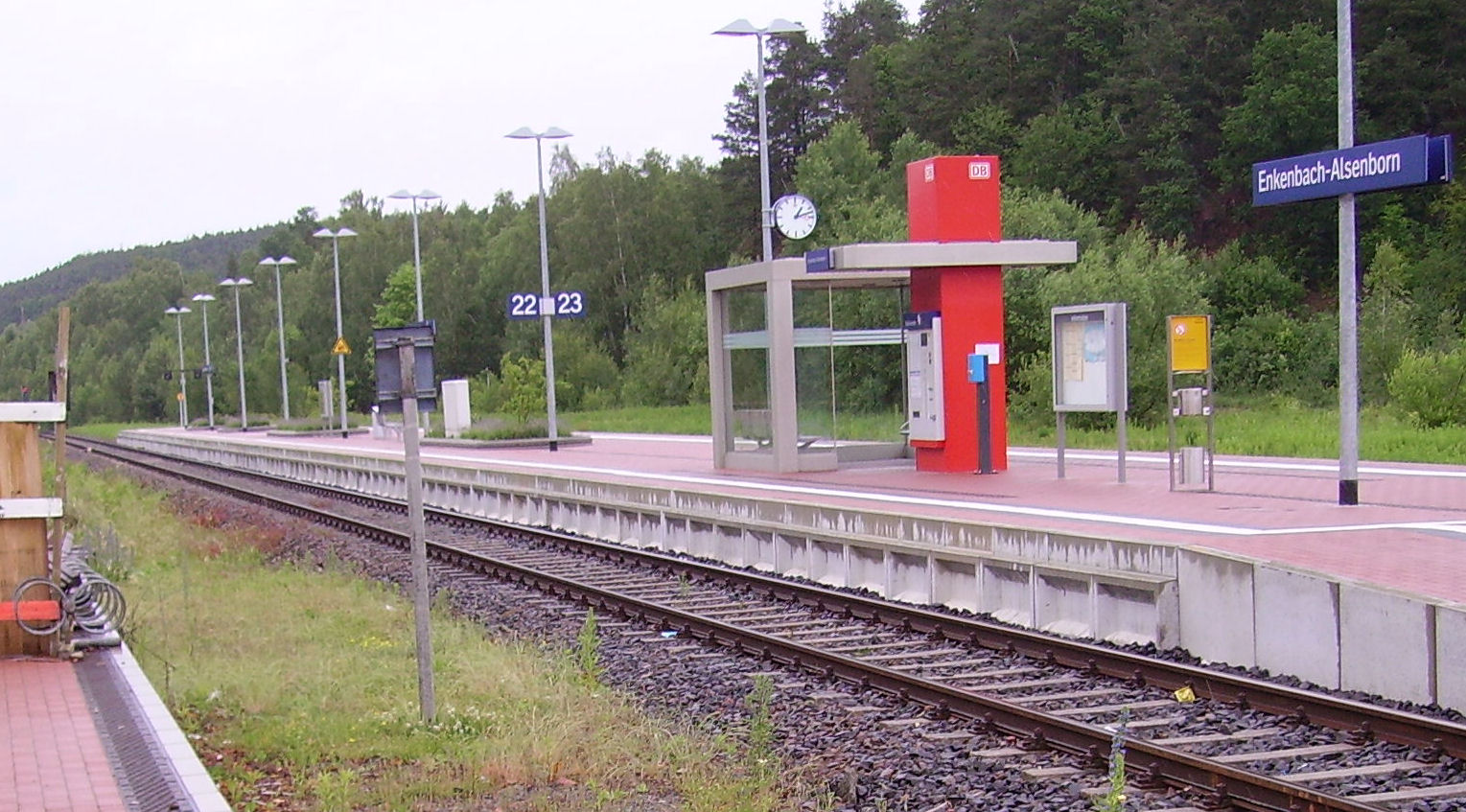
Platform of Enkenbach station

Enkenbach station is the only station in Enkenbach-Alsenborn in the German state of Rhineland-Palatinate. It has two platforms tracks and is located in the network of the Verkehrsverbund Rhein-Neckar (Rhine-Neckar transport association, VRN) and belongs to fare zone 828. Its address is Bahnhofstraße 2.

It is located on the Alsenz Valley Railway (Alsenztalbahn, Hochspeyer–Bad Münster) and was put into service on 29 October 1870 with the opening of the section from Hochspeyer to Winnweiler. On 16 May of the following year it was opened over its whole length. In 1875, the station became the eastern end of the Kaiserslautern–Enkenbach railway, which formed a shorter route for trains from the Alsenz line to Kaiserslautern. In 1932, the Eis Valley Railway (Eistalbahn, Grünstadt–Eisenberg), which was opened in 1876, was extended through to Enkenbach. Between Eiswoog and Enkenbach, the latter line has now been closed.

== Location ==
The station is located on the eastern edge of the Enkenbach district of the Enkenbach-Alsenborn municipality of Rhineland-Palatinate. The local streets of Bahnhofstraße and Klosterbach run to the west of and parallel to it. Rosenhofstraße – which is also marked as state route 395 – crosses the southern station area. Just east of the station is the village of Alsenborn. It has parking, bicycle parking, a bus stop and a barrier-free entrance.

=== Railway lines ===
The Alsenz Valley Railway runs in the station area from the south-southeast to the north-northwest. South of Enkenbach the otherwise two-track line has only one track. The Kaiserslautern–Enkenbach railway reaches the station from a south-west direction in a 90-degree curve. The Eis Valley Railway, which has been closed in this area, crossed the Alsenz line north of the station, and then entered the Stumpfwald via Alsenborn.

== History ==
=== Planning, construction and early years ===
Around 1860, there were the first plans for a railway line along the Alsenz. This would have connected with the Neustadt–Wissembourg railway (Maximiliansbahn) and the section of the Palatine Ludwig Railway (Pfälzischen Ludwigsbahn, now mainly the Mannheim–Saarbrücken railway) immediately west of Neustadt as a through route in the north–south direction. Since Enkenbach itself is not on the river, it was unclear whether the line would have passed through it. The town of Otterberg, which lies further west, sought, for example, a route through its territory. However, the competent engineer rejected this and recommended a route through Enkenbach to Hochspeyer, since this was topographically easier.

The Hochspeyer–Winnweiler section was opened on 29 October 1870 and on 16 May of the following year, the line to Münster was completed. In the beginning, Enkenbach was a stop for long-distance trains towards Neustadt and Kaiserslautern.

Although the line connected towards Kaiserslautern at Hochspeyer station, the municipality felt the route through Hochspeyer was inconvenient. Therefore, the Kaiserslautern–Enkenbach railway was opened on 15 May 1875.

=== Further development ===
Already during the planning of the Eis Valley Railway, which opened in 1876 and ran from Grünstadt to Eisenberg, there were plans to extend it to Enkenbach in the long term. This would have also given the shortest possible connection between Kaiserslautern and Worms. However, the resistance of Bavaria prevented the connection being built. At the beginning of the 20th century, construction was prevented by the First World War.

In 1922, the station was integrated into the newly founded Reichsbahndirektion Ludwigshafen (railway division of Ludwigshafen). In the same year the construction of the extension of the Eis Valley Railway to Enkenbach began, but it was interrupted by the occupation of the Palatinate by the French. It was not until 5 November 1932 that the Eis Valley Railway was connected to Enkenbach. During the dissolution of the railway division of Ludwigshafen, on 1 April 1937, it was transferred to the railway division of Mainz.

After the Second World War, the newly founded Deutsche Bundesbahn (DB) incorporated the station into the railway division of Mainz, which was assigned all the railway lines in the newly created state of Rhineland-Palatinate. As early as 1971, it became a part of the railway division of Trier with the dissolution of the railway division of Mainz.

In 2000, the station, like the entire Western Palatinate, became part of the Westpfalz-Verkehrsverbund (Western Palatinate transport association, WVV) at its foundation, but the WVV was absorbed into the Verkehrsverbund Rhein-Neckar (Rhine-Neckar transport association, VRN) six years later.

== Entrance building ==
The entrance building was built in the neoclassical style. Similar buildings were also found in the railway network of the Palatinate Railway stations of Annweiler am Trifels, Kirchheimbolanden, Langmeil and Marnheim.

== Operations ==
=== Passenger services ===
In the first years services to Kaiserslautern ran exclusively via Hochspeyer, until 1875 with the Kaiserslautern–Enkenbach railway a shortcut was created. After the completion of the Biebermühl Railway (Kaiserslautern–Pirmasens) in 1913, a continuous service ran through Enkenbach over the Donnersberg Railway (Donnersbergbahn) to Mainz and over the Zeller Valley Railway (Zellertalbahn) and on to Darmstadt. The trains of the Alsenz Valley Railway used to continue to Pirmasens from 1994 to 2002.

The following service stops at Enkenbach station:

Rail services in the 2025 timetable
Train service	Route	Interval
RB 65	Kaiserslautern – (Hochspeyer –) Enkenbach – Rockenhausen – Bad Münster a Stein – Bad Kreuznach – Langenlonsheim – Bingen (Rhein)	Hourly

=== Freight ===
Freight transport has now been abandoned and all the tracks have been dismantled.

== Sources ==
=== Bibliography ===
- Heinz Sturm (2005). Die pfälzischen Eisenbahnen (in German). Ludwigshafen am Rhein: pro MESSAGE. ISBN 3-934-84526-6.
