= VRN =

VRN may refer to:

- Vehicle Registration Number on license plates
- Verkehrsverbund Rhein-Neckar, a German transport association
- Verona Airport, Italy (IATA:VRN)
- Varig, a Brazilian airline (ICAO:VRN)
