= Frankenstein (Pfalz) station =

Railway station in Frankenstein, Germany

Frankenstein (Pfalz)
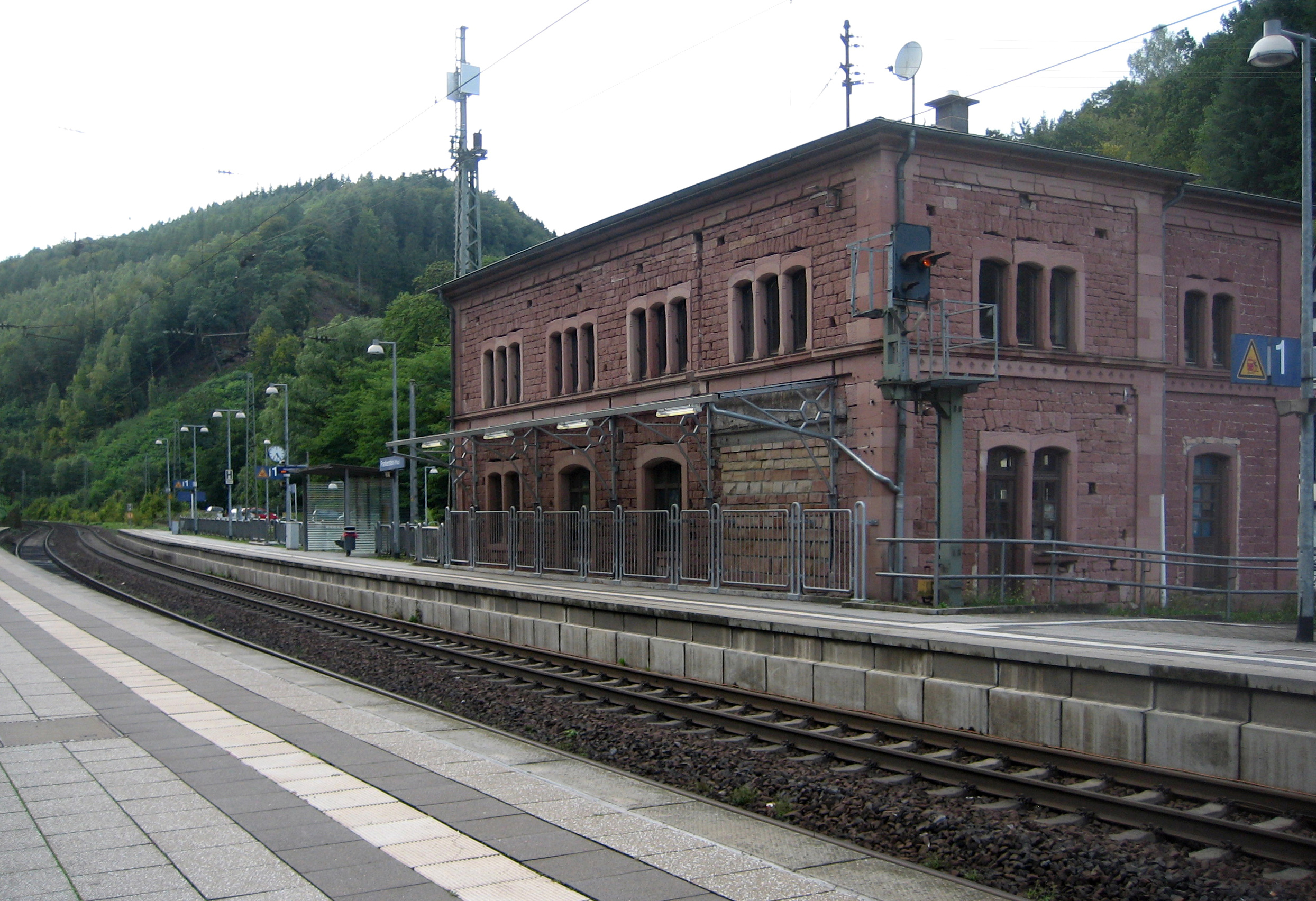
- Frankenstein station with the former station building in the background

General information
- Location: Hauptstr. 9, Frankenstein, Rhineland-Palatinate; Germany
- Coordinates: 49°26′21″N 7°58′11″E
- Lines: Mannheim–Saarbrücken (km 59.25) (KBS 670)
- Platforms: 2

Construction
- Accessible: Yes
- Architectural style: Neoclassical

Other information
- Station code: 1846
- DS100 code: RFST
- IBNR: 8002036
- Category: 6
- Fare zone: VRN: 990
- Website: www.bahnhof.de

History
- Opened: 2 December 1848
Location

Frankenstein (Pfalz) station is the station of the town of Frankenstein in the German state of Rhineland-Palatinate. Deutsche Bahn classifies it as a category 6 station and it has two platforms.

It is located on the Mannheim–Saarbrücken railway, which essentially consists of the Palatine Ludwig Railway (Pfälzische Ludwigsbahn, Ludwigshafen–Bexbach). It was opened on 2 December 1848 with the Kaiserslautern–Frankenstein section of the Ludwig Railway. On 25 August of the following year, the gap to Neustadt was closed, so that the Ludwig Railway had reached its full length. Since December 2003 it has been a stop for services on line S1 and S2 of the Rhine-Neckar S-Bahn. Its entrance building is a protected monument.

== Location ==
The halt (Haltepunkt) is located on the northwestern outskirts of Frankenstein (Pfalz). Its address is Hauptstraße 9. Federal highway 37 and the Hochspeyerbach run directly parallel to the railway track. A few hundred metres east of it is the Schlossberg (castle hill) of Frankenstein Castle, which the line passes under through the Schlossberg Tunnel. North of the station, the village of Diemerstein is located in the Diemerstein valley. The Glasbach flows into the Hochspeyerbach to the west of the station.

== History ==
Originally, it had been planned to build a railway orientated north–south within the then Bavarian Circle of the Rhine (Rheinkreis) to compete with the Baden’s projected Mannheim–Basel railway. At the same time, industrialists from the Palatinate, which had also been called the Rheinkreis since the 1830s, had an interest in facilitating the transport of coal to the Rhine from the mines in the area around Bexbach. A route running generally through Kaiserslautern and as a result Frankenstein was established during the early planning period. Frankenstein had a station from the beginning, unlike the larger neighbouring town of Hochspeyer. The interests of Paul Camille Denis, the builder of the Ludwig Railway played an important role In the process. On the one hand, he was a friend of Carl Adolph Ritter, who was living in the village. In addition, Denis settled down temporarily in the village, acquired Diemerstein Castle and built a villa, the so-called Villa Denis, in the immediate vicinity. On 21 December 1837 the Bavarian king Ludwig I. approved the construction of a main line running east–west from Rheinschanze to Bexbach.

The Ludwigshafen–Neustadt section was opened on 11 June 1847. As the crossing of the Palatinate Forest (Pfälzerwald) between Kaiserslautern and Neustadt proved to be particularly expensive, the railway was not continually extended to the west after the opening of the section from Ludwigshafen (formerly Rheinschanze) to Neustadt. The earth base of the Homburg–Kaiserslautern section had been built at this time and the embankments were largely complete as far as Frankenstein. The Homburg–Kaiserslautern section was opened on 2 July 1848. The section was continued past Frankenstein on 2 December. The entrance building had already been completed on 16 November. The station clock had been installed by 3 November. On 6 June of the following year, the line was extended to Bexbach in the west. The completion of the Neustadt–Frankenstein section was especially delayed by the acquisition of the land required for railway construction and the need to overcome difficult topography. As a result, ten tunnels had to be built through hills and foothills of different mountains. The opening ceremony finally took place on 25 August 1849.

=== Further development ===
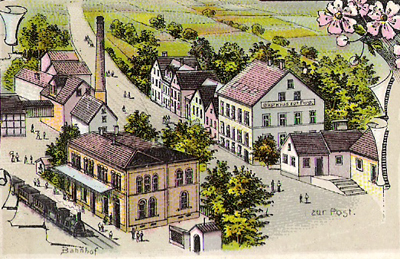
Frankenstein station in 1900

At the beginning of the twentieth century, the station had ticket gates like other stations in the Palatinate. During this time, the station was managed by the operations and construction inspectorate (Betriebs- und Bauinspektion) of Neustadt an der Haardt and was part of the responsibility of the Bahnmeisterei Lambrecht (office of the track master of Lambrecht). In 1922, the station was integrated into the new Reichsbahndirektion Ludwigshafen (railway division of Ludwigshafen). A year later, the railway workers employed at the railway station were expelled during the operation of the railway by the French military during the occupation of the Palatinate by France. They then returned to work.

During the dissolution of the railway division of Ludwigshafen on 1 April 1937, it was transferred to the railway division of Mainz and the Betriebsamtes (RBA) Neustadt (operations office of Neustadt). After the Second World War, the newly founded Deutsche Bundesbahn (DB) transferred the station to the Bundesbahndirektion Mainz (Bundesbahn railway division of Mainz), which was assigned all railway lines within the newly created state of Rhineland-Palatinate. The trunk line from Mannheim to Saarbrücken has always been of great importance for long-distance traffic and it was gradually electrified starting in 1960. The Saarbrücken–Homburg section could be operated electrically on 8 March 1960. The Homburg–Kaiserslautern section followed on 18 May 1961 and the line could be electrically operated along its entire length from 12 March 1964. The electrification of the remaining section was delayed mainly because of the numerous tunnels that had to be enlarged between Kaiserslautern and Neustadt. In 1962, the masts and gantries were already in place at the station, while the wire was not yet installed. A set of points was installed in the eastern part of the station since only the southern track in the adjoining Schlossberg tunnel could be used during the electrification work. The entire line, including Frankenstein station, could be used by 12 March 1964.

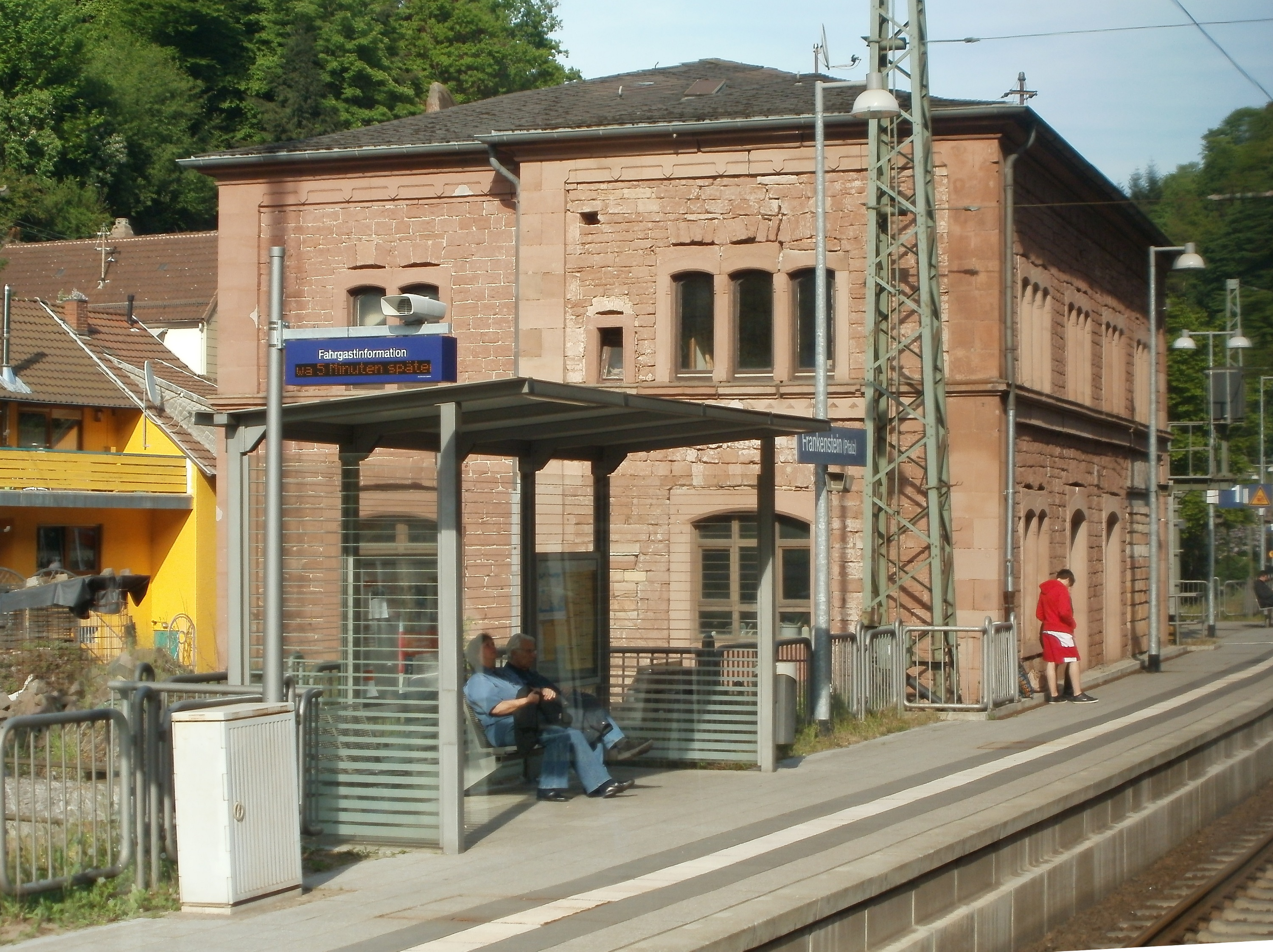
Platform for services towards Kaiserslautern in 2011, with the former entrance building in the background

It became a part of the railway division of Karlsruhe with the dissolution of the railway division of Mainz on 1 August 1971. At the same time the platforms were raised. The border with the neighboring railway division of Saarbrücken was immediately west of the station. Since 1996 the station has been part of the Verkehrsverbund Rhein-Neckar (Rhine-Neckar transport association, VRN). From 2000 to 2006, it had been part of the Westpfalz-Verkehrsverbund (Western Palatinate transport association, WVV). With the integration of the Mannheim–Saarbrücken railway as far as Kaiserslautern into the network of the Rhine-Neckar S-Bahn in 2003, the expansion of the railway platform was upgraded on behalf of DB Station&Service by the company of Wieland & Schultz GmbH. The S-Bahn, which the station has since been integrated into, was opened on 14 December 2003.

== Infrastructure ==
=== Entrance building ===
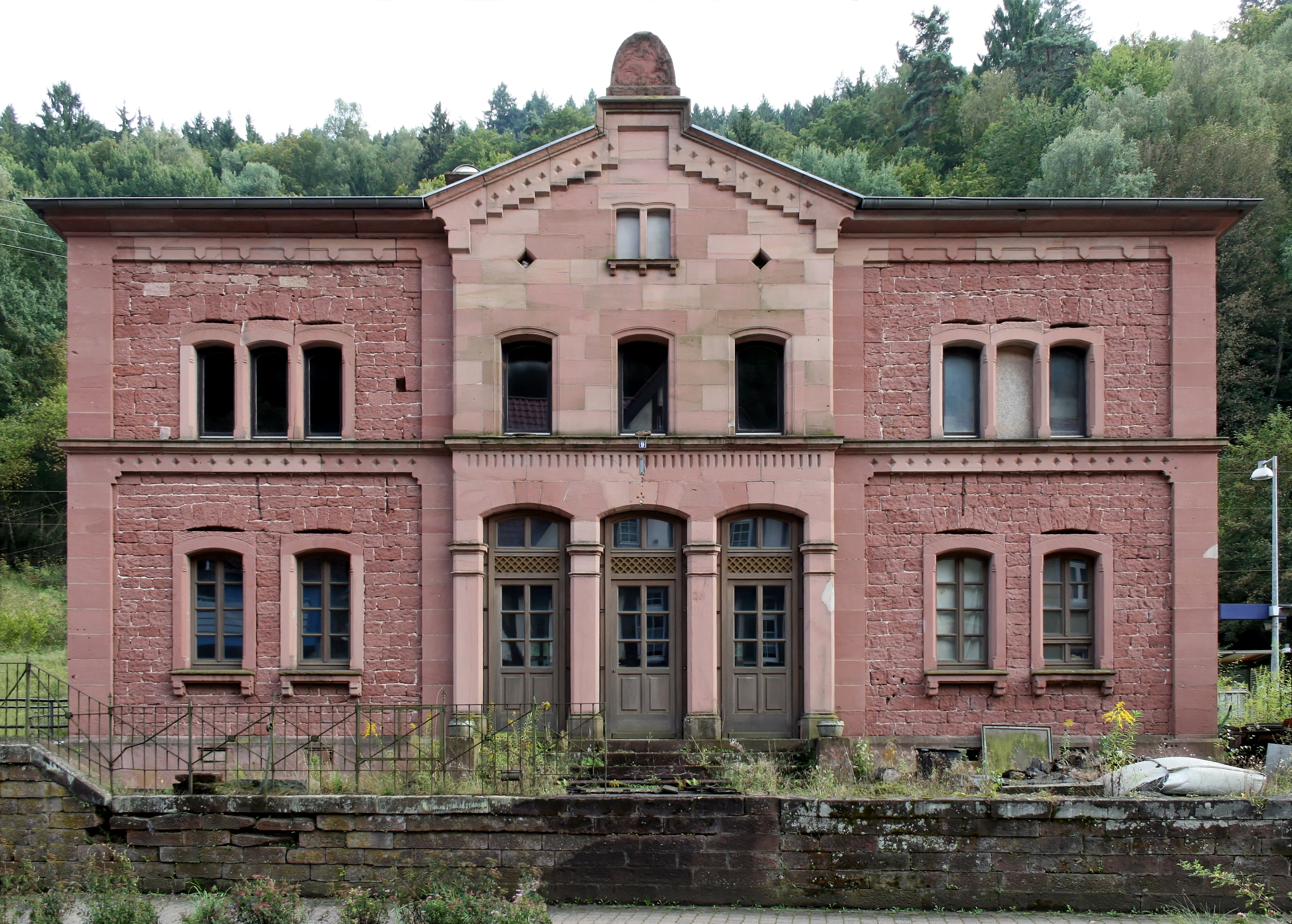
The entrance building seen from the street side

The entrance building was built during the time of the line's construction in the Italian style of architecture as many—some replaced in the meantime—of the entrance buildings on the then Ludwig Railway. It is built in the style of a Schloss (palace). For a village the size of Frankenstein, it was architecturally very sophisticated, which was due to the fact that Denis had settled locally in the village. In contrast, the entrance buildings of Kaiserslautern and Neustadt were made of wood only.

It is a two-and-a-half-storey building, with a shale-covered hip roof with neoclassical features, including a gabled Avant-corps. For a long time, the building was plastered and had a canopy over the "house" platform. This was restored in the 2010s. The building is not used for railway operations anymore and currently has no new purpose. Public access no longer exists.

=== Installations and other buildings ===
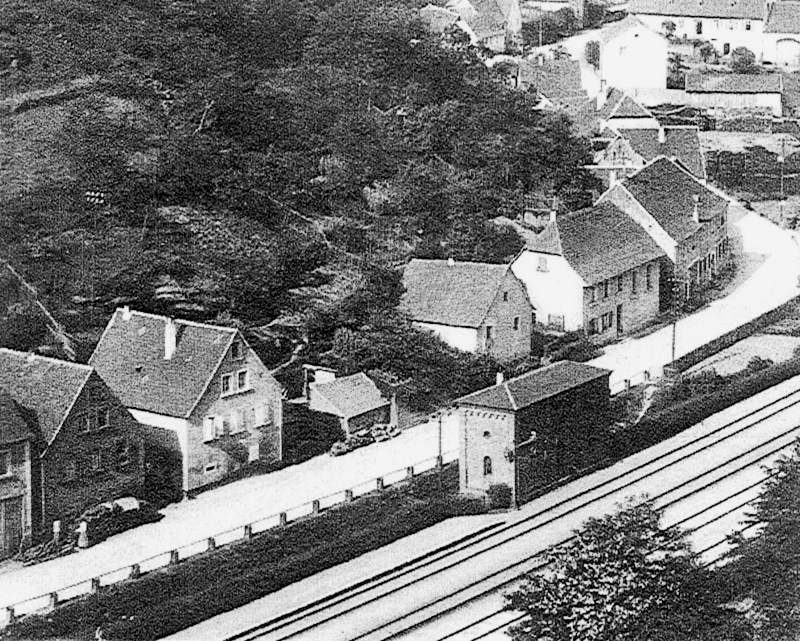
Eastern area of Frankenstein station with signal box in 1899

Next to the two through tracks, there was a dead-end track in the northern part of the station and another freight track in the southern part. In the eastern railway station area, there was a signal box on the north side of the railway tracks. In the meantime the facilities have been dismantled and the station has been reclassified as a Haltepunkt (halt). Remains of the northern dead-end track still exist. In addition to the platform, there was an island platform between the two main tracks, which was later replaced by an external platform on the southern side of the station.

== Operations ==
=== Passengers ===
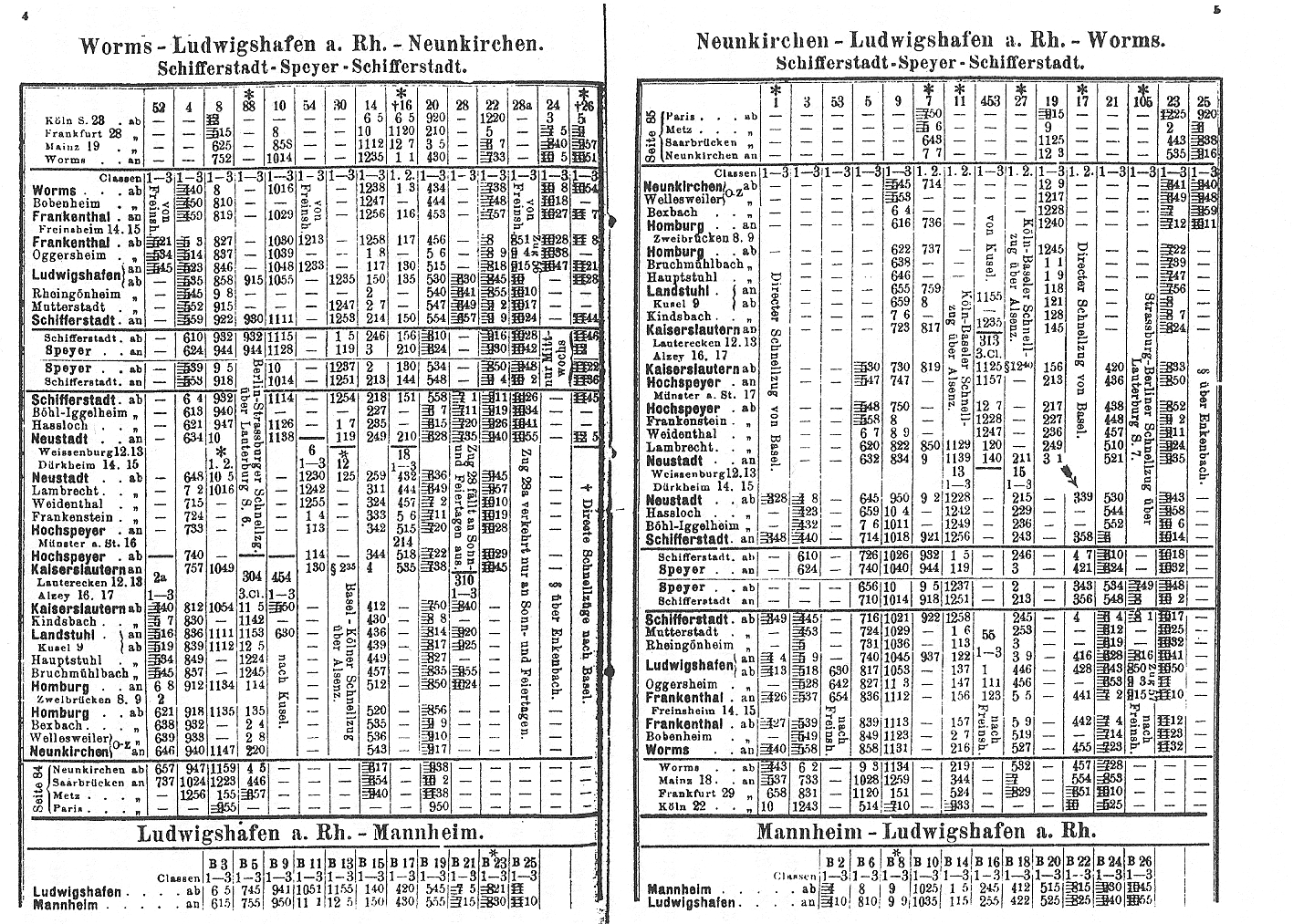
Timetable in 1884

After the opening of the Kaiserslautern–Frankenstein section in December 1848, a total of three train pairs originally ran to Homburg. In 1865, there were three train pairs on the Worms–Neunkirchen route. In 1871, the travelling time for passenger trains took between 27 and 31 minutes from Frankenstein to Kaiserslautern and up to 40 minutes to Neustadt. In 1884, local trains ran primarily on the Neunkirchen–Worms route. In addition there were trains, which ran only on part of the line such as Neustadt–Kaiserslautern and Kaiserslautern–Worms. Some did not stop at all stations, and Frankenstein was not served by all local trains.

In the summer of 1914, the trains on the Alsenz Valley Railway (Alsenztalbahn) ran on the Bad Münster–Neustadt route, requiring a reversal in Hochspeyer station with the locomotive running around the train, and also stopping in Frankenstein. During the First World War and the inter-war period, local transport was largely limited to the Neustadt–Kaiserslautern route. In the middle of the Second World War, most local services on the Mannheim–Saarbrücken railway ran only on sections of the line. As a rule, they ran as far west as Homburg at the most. In the post-war period, services were largely limited to the Neustadt–Kaiserslautern section. From 1991, trains on the Trier–Offenburg route stopped at all stations to the east of Kaiserslautern and thus also in Frankenstein. A few years later the Homburg–Neckarelz route was added, continuing to Osterburken or Heilbronn. From 2001 onwards the trains that previously ran to Offenburg, largely ran only as far as Karlsruhe.

In 2014, the Rheintal-Express and Weinstraßen-Express services, which ran from May to October on Sundays and holidays on the Koblenz–Bingen–Bad Kreuznach–Rockenhausen–Neustadt route, continuing to Wissembourg or Karlsruhe, stopped in Frankenstein.

Trains services in the 2017 timetable
| Line | Route | Interval |
|---|---|---|
| S1 | Homburg (Saar) – Kaiserslautern – Hochspeyer – Frankenstein (Pfalz) – Neustadt (Weinstr) – Mannheim – Heidelberg – Eberbach – Mosbach (Baden) –Osterburken | Hourly |
| S2 | Kaiserslautern – Hochspeyer – Frankenstein (Pfalz) – Neustadt (Weinstr) – Mannheim – Heidelberg – Eberbach – Mosbach (Baden) | Hourly |

=== Freight ===
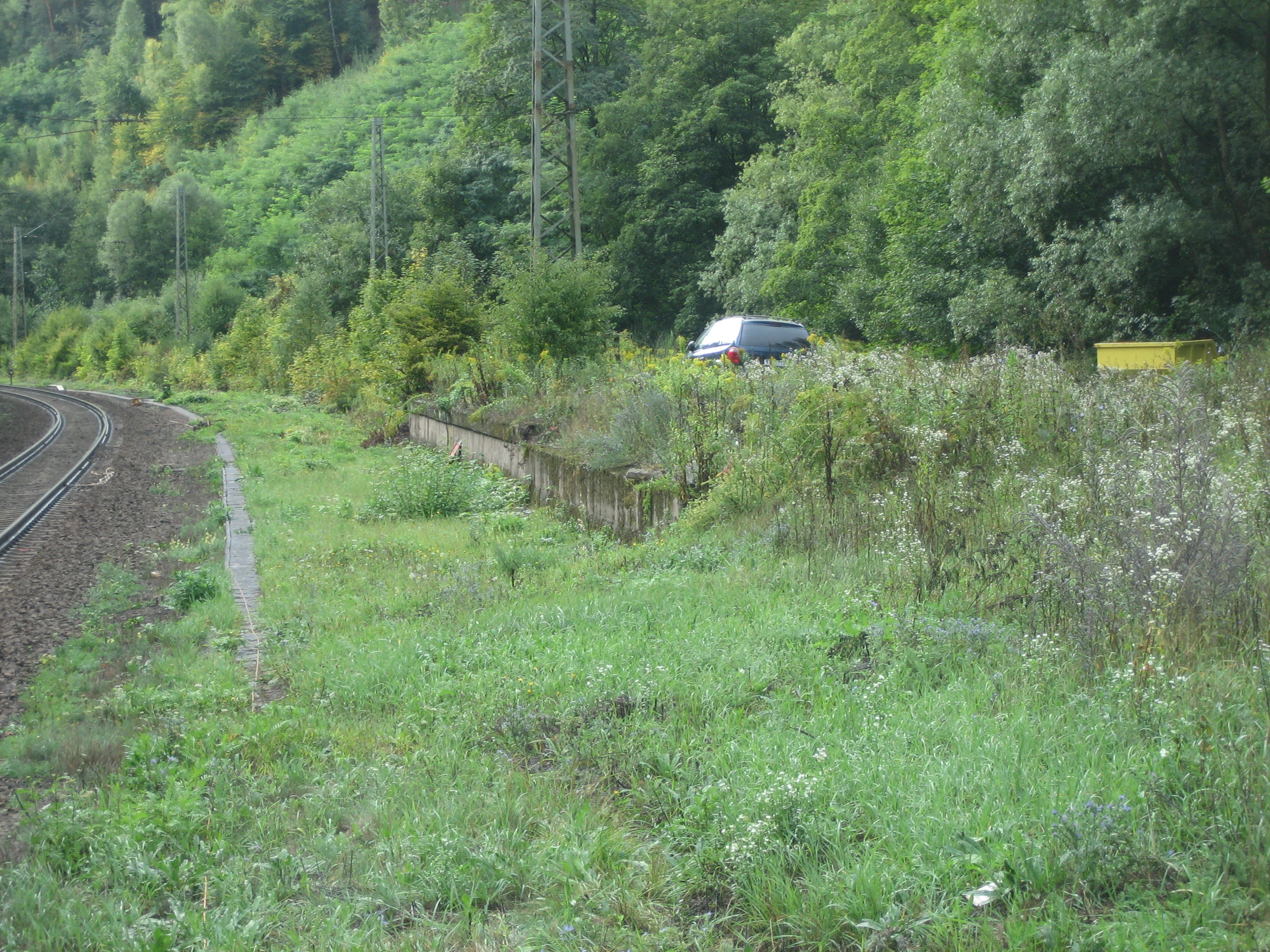
Former loading ramp at the station with remains of tracks

Like all stations along the Ludwig Railway at that time, the station had facilities for handling freight. In 1871, the normal freight trains on the Ludwig Railway on the Kaiserslautern–Mainz, Homburg–Frankenthal, Ludwigshafen–Neunkirchen, Worms–Homburg routes stopped at the station for between three and five minutes. In addition there was a stone train on the Kaiserslautern–Ludwigshafen route, which stopped at the station for a total of 20 minutes. Coal trains stopped at the station for between three and four minutes. From the 1980s onwards Übergabezüge (goods exchange trains) served the station. It was based in Neustadter Hauptbahnhof. All freight traffic has since been abandoned.

== Incidents ==
On 28 October 1863, an empty freight train arrived at the station. A van packed with 50 workers was attached at its rear. The driver had stopped to take on water for his locomotive and once this was done, he restarted the train. A passenger train running in the same direction crashed into the van, resulting in seven deaths.

== Sources ==
=== Further reading ===
- Heinz Sturm (2005). Die pfälzischen Eisenbahnen (in German). Ludwigshafen am Rhein: pro MESSAGE. ISBN 3-934845-26-6.
