= Alsenz Valley Railway =

Railway line in Germany

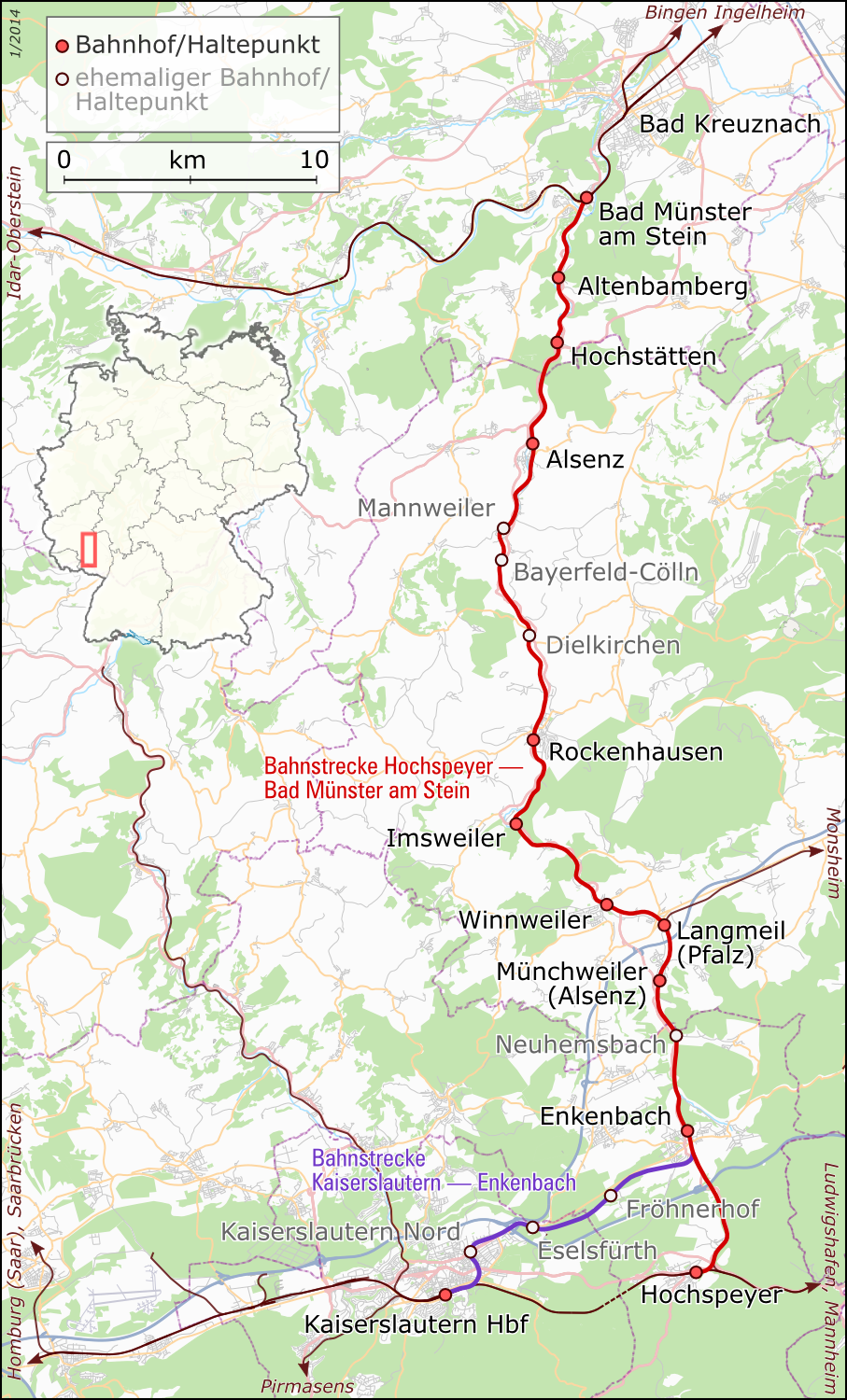
- Route

Overview
- Native name: Alsenztalbahn
- Line number: 3280 (Kaiserslautern–Hochspeyer); 3303 (Kaiserslautern–Enkenbach); 3320 (Hochspeyer–Bad Münster am Stein)
- Locale: Rhineland-Palatinate, Germany
- Termini: Hochspeyer; Bad Münster am Stein

Service
- Route number: 672

Technical
- Line length: 73.7 km (45.8 mi)
- Number of tracks: 2: Enkenbach–Bad Münster
- Track gauge: 1,435 mm (4 ft 8 1/2 in) standard gauge

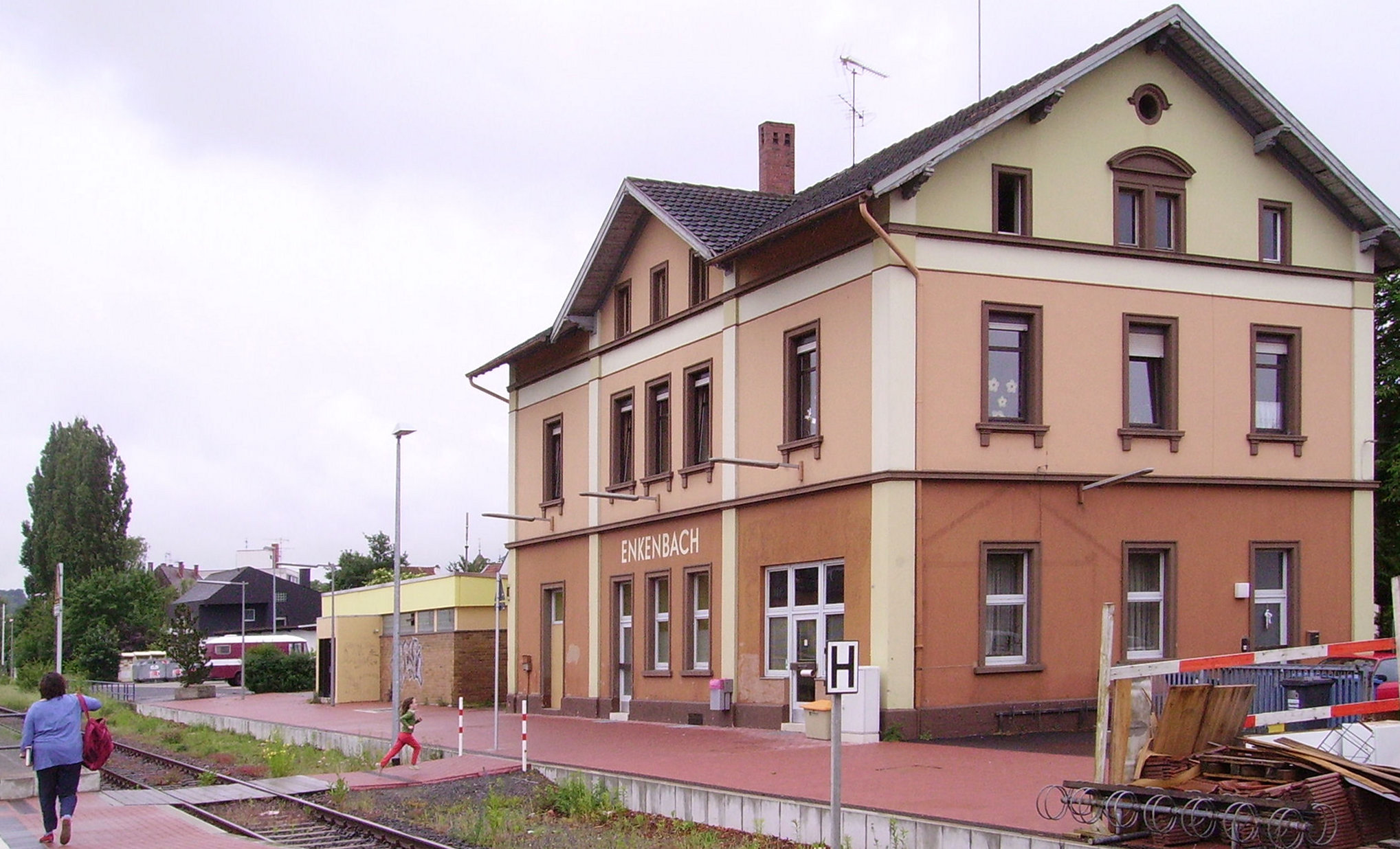
Enkenbach station

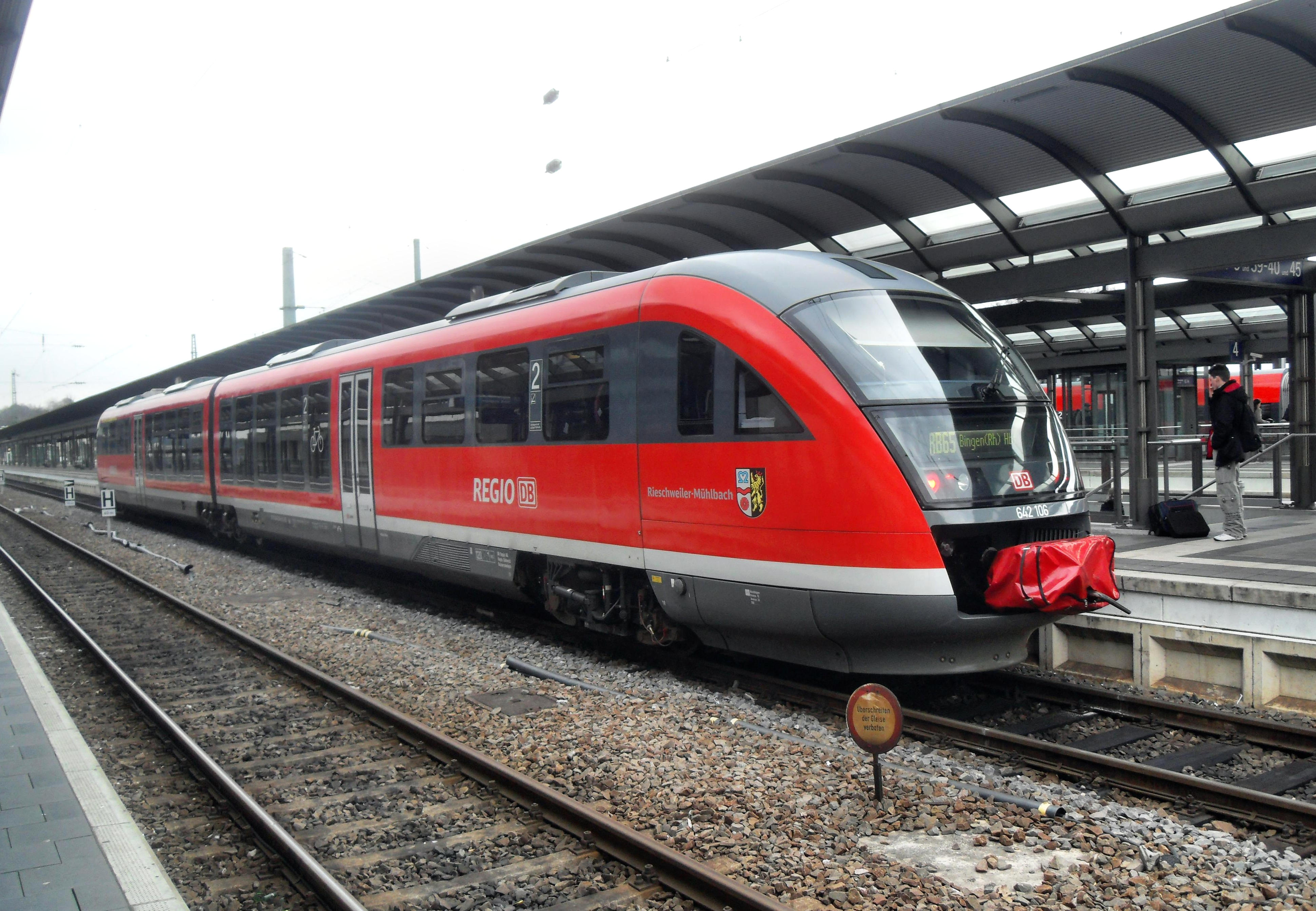
Regionalbahn service in Kaiserslautern on its way to Bingen

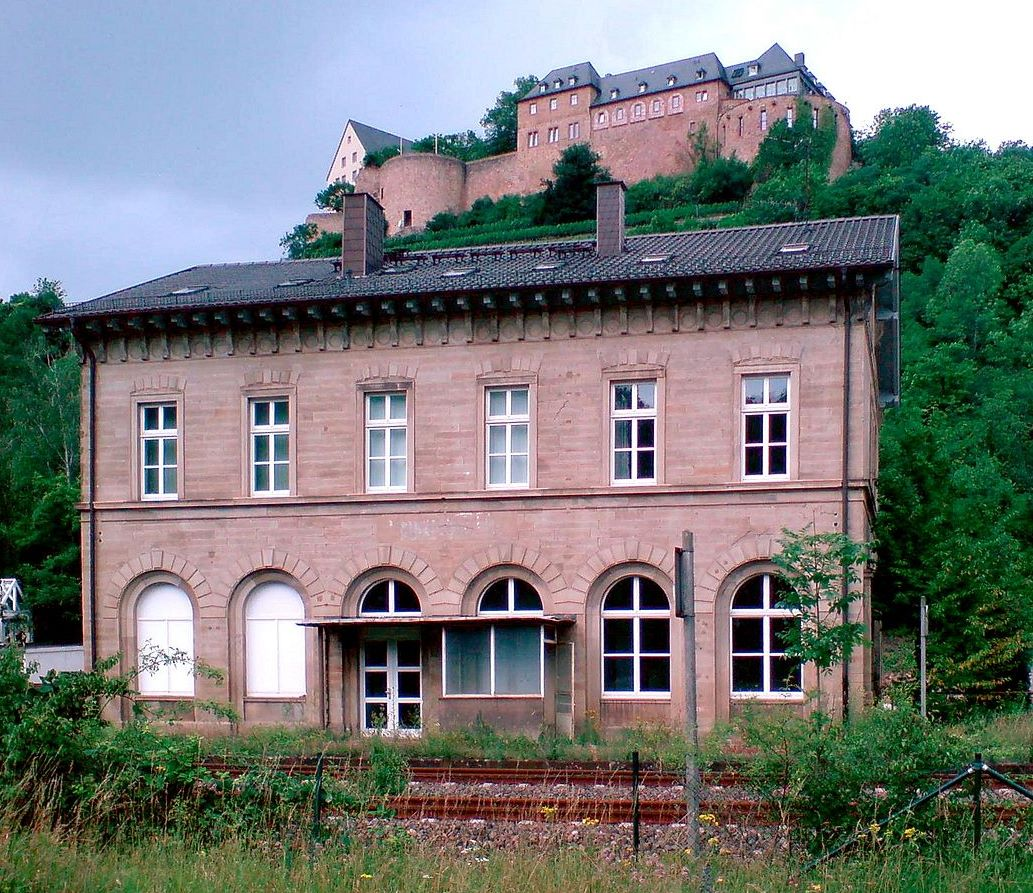
Ebernburg station below the Ebernburg

The Alsenz Valley Railway (German: Alsenztalbahn) is a line that runs from Hochspeyer via Winnweiler and Alsenz to Bad Munster am Stein in the German state of Rhineland-Palatinate. The line closely follows the Alsenz river from the Enkenbach district and crosses it several times. It was originally built primarily as a long-distance route, but it has lost this function since 1990 and is now exclusively used for local transport.

== Route ==
Between Enkenbach and Bad Münster the line has continuous double track; only the Enkenbach–Hochspeyer section is single track. From Enkenbach the line follows the Alsenz river to Alsenz. Due to the difficult topographical conditions, the line has to cross the Alsenz river several times and has three tunnels. It runs along the edge of the Palatinate Forest to about Langmeil, where it enters the North Palatine Uplands.

From Hochspeyer to the abandoned Neuhemsbach station the line is within the district of Kaiserslautern, from Münchweiler an der Alsenz to the Alsenz municipality it is in Donnersbergkreis and the remaining section is located in the district of Bad Kreuznach.

== History ==
From 1859 there was a continuous north-south trunk line from the Rhineland via Rhenish Hesse to Ludwigshafen in the form of the West Rhine Railway between Cologne and Mainz and the Mainz–Ludwigshafen railway. But the lines running via Mainz were indirect, so plans emerged for the building of a shorter line from about Bingen am Rhein south along the Alsenz to the catchment area of the Donnersberg via Enkenbach and from there towards Neustadt. In order to take account of the interests of the city of Kaiserslautern, a connection curve was created south of Fischbach to Hochspeyer to allow appropriate movements. The Hochspeyer–Winnweiler section was opened on 29 October 1870. The Winnweiler–Bad Munster am Stein section followed on 16 May 1871.

After the Franco-Prussian War of 1870 and 1871 there was an increased interest in building strategic railways in southwest Germany. There were demands for a direct connection between Kaiserslautern and Enkenbach, as the existing route via Hochspeyer was considered too roundabout for this purpose. The city of Kaiserslautern made land available for the proposed line. The connection between Kaiserslautern and Enkenbach was opened on 15 May 1875. The line included the stations of Kaiserslautern Nord and Eselsfürth.

=== Development up to the Second World War (1875–1945) ===
Alsenz Valley Railway was operated by the Palatine Northern Railway Company (Gesellschaft der Pfälzischen Nordbahnen) and functioned as its main line.

The Bad Münster–Enkenbach section was frequented by the 1920s by long-distance trains on the Cologne–Bingen–Neustadt–Landau–Wissembourg–Strasbourg route. However, after Alsace was ceded to France after the First World War, the line lost much of its traffic towards Neustadt. Since the Enkenbach–Eselsfürth–Kaiserslautern route is shorter than the route via Hochspeyer, most trains approach Kaiserslautern via Eselsfürth.

After the Zeller Valley Railway (Zellertalbahn) was completed from Langmeil to Monsheim) in 1873 and the Donnersberg Railway (Donnersbergbahn) was completed from Alzey to Marnheim in 1874, the section between Kaiserslautern and Langmeil also carried long-distance trains to the Rhine-Main area via Worms to Frankfurt or via Alzey to Mainz. The Eis Valley Railway (Eistalbahn) was opened in 1876 from Grünstadt to Eisenberg and connected to Enkenbach in 1932. Some of its services connected with Kaiserslautern.

In 1942, during the Second World War, a major accident occurred on the line: in the morning a military train and a freight train collided with each other in Enkenbach. The incident killed two people and wounded many others. A greater tragedy was avoided because the first two carriages of the military train were only lightly occupied.

=== Deutsche Bundesbahn and Deutsche Bahn (since 1945) ===
After the Second World War, several intermediate stops (Neuhemsbach, Dielkirchen, Bayerfeld-Colln, Mannweiler, Ebernburg) were abandoned due to low patronage. After all the connecting lines, the Eis Valley Railway, the Zeller Valley Railway and the Donnersberg Railway, had been closed for passenger services between 1983 and 1994, the Alsenz Valley Railway was the only line that was in full operation in the Donnersbergkreis. The narrow-gauge railway to Obermoschel had already been closed in the 1930s.

In 1970, the Hochstein tunnel, also called the Eisenschmelz tunnel, located at kilometre 19, was converted into a cutting. Until 1990 the line was also served by a Schnellzug (express) on the Paris Est–Metz–Saarbrücken–Kaiserslautern–Bad Kreuznach–Mainz–Frankfurt am Main route, which was operated until the mid-1970s with SNCF DEV Inox cars and then by Corail cars. Between 1988 and 1990 they were partially replaced by express services from Pirmasens via Kaiserslautern and Bingen to Cologne. Since then, these trains have been abandoned and the Alsenz Valley Railway has lost all long-distance services.

In 1999, a new station was set up in Münchweiler an der Alsenz between Langmeil and the abandoned station of Neuhemsbach. Consequently, the Langmeil station, which had previously been used by Münchweiler's population, lost its importance, which led to it being abandoned in late 2006. Even with the recommencement of services on Sundays and public holidays in 2001 on the now reactivated Zeller Valley Railway, trains no longer serve this once important junction station.

As part of the expanded Rhineland-Palatinate integrated regular-interval timetable being introduced from 2015, new Regional-Express services will be introduced on the Koblenz–Bingen–Bad Kreuznach–Kaiserslautern route (from December 2016) and the Mainz–Bad Kreuznach–Kaiserslautern route (from December 2014). They will both run on the Alsenz Valley Railway and be operated by Netinera.

== Operations ==
Deutsche Bahn operates hourly services on the line. It is listed in the Deutsche Bahn timetable (KBS) as line 672. Until the timetable change in December 2008, the services continued over the Biebermühl Railway to Pirmasens; since then only Regionalbahn services have run between Kaiserslautern and Bingen.

From Kaiserslautern to Alsenz, the line runs within the area of the Verkehrsverbund Rhein-Neckar (Rhine-Neckar Transport Association, VRN) and from Hochstätten to Bad Münster it is within the area of the Rhein-Nahe Nahverkehrsverbund (Rhine-Nahe Transport Association, RNN).

On Sundays and public holidays in the summer, the Rheintalexpress runs on the Bingen–Enkenbach section to Karlsruhe and the Weinstraßen-Express runs to Wissembourg, each stopping in Enkenbach, Rockhausen, Bad Münster and Bad Kreuznach and each consisting of push–pull trains hauled by class 218 locomotives or class 628 diesel multiple units. Furthermore, the Langmeil–Hochspeyer section is served in the summer on Sundays and public holidays by daily services on the Zeller Valley Railway route.

=== Rolling stock ===
In 2000, 628 diesel multiple units were replaced by modern Talent railcars of class 643. Since the timetable change in December 2008, Desiro trains of class 642 also operate. Previously, local services were mostly operated with Silberling carriages. These were hauled diesel locomotives of class 218; in the winter coupled French locomotives were also sometimes used.

== Future ==
There are plans to electrify and upgrade the line along with the Palatine Maximilian Railway to relieve the Rhine Valley lines between Bingen and Karlsruhe of freight trains. The state of Rhineland-Palatinate has recommended the project for the 2015 Federal Transport Infrastructure Plan (Bundesverkehrswegeplan).
