= Heiligenberg Tunnel =

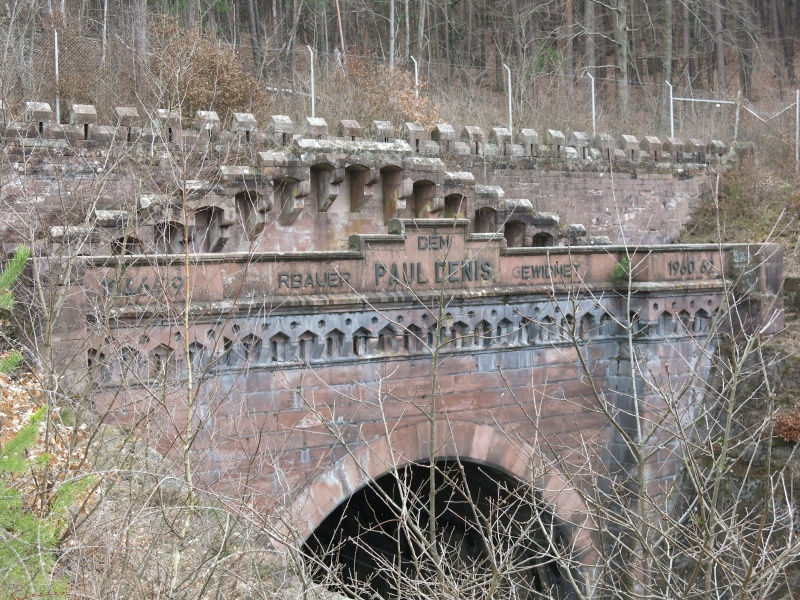
- Heiligenberg tunnel's West portal, with an inscription dedicated to Paul Denis
- Interactive map of Heiligenberg Tunnel

Overview
- Line: Mannheim–Saarbrücken railway
- Location: Hochspeyer, Rhineland-Palatinate, Germany; Kaiserslautern
- Coordinates: East portal: 49°26′17″N 7°52′5″E; West portal: 49°25′54″N 7°51′8″E

Operation
- Opened: 2 December 1848
- Owner: Deutsche Bahn
- Character: 1 bore

Technical
- Length: 1,347 m (4,419 ft)
- No. of tracks: 2
- Track gauge: 1,435 mm (4 ft 8 1/2 in) standard gauge
- Electrified: 15 kV/16.7 Hz AC overhead catenary

The Heiligenberg Tunnel is the longest of a total of twelve tunnels on the Mannheim-Saarbrücken railway and the longest in the Palatinate. The tunnel crosses the Palatine Watershed in the German state of Rhineland-Palatinate. It was originally built for a single track, but a second track was built a few years later.

== Location ==
The tunnel is located in the northwest of the Palatine Forest (Pfälzerwald). It is located mainly on the urban area of Kaiserslautern; the smaller, eastern part is in Hochspeyer. The tunnel passes through the Heiligenberg mountain without a curve.

== History ==
The Bavarian King Ludwig I approved the construction of a main line railway running east-west from Rheinschanze to Bexbach on 21 December 1837. Between Hochspeyer and Kaiserslautern numerous hills and mountains had to be overcome. The construction of the route was a problem, because line had to pass over the watershed between the Lauter and the Hochspeyerbach between these two towns. This required the construction of a 1347-metre-long tunnel. As early as 1847, railway traffic commenced between Ludwigshafen and Neustadt. The line between Kaiserslautern and Homburg opened on 2 July 1848; this was followed by the opening of the Frankenstein–Homburg section and then the Frankenstein–Kaiserslautern section, including the Heiligenberg Tunnel, which was opened on 2 December 1848.

Since the main line from Mannheim to Saarbrücken had always been of great importance for long-distance traffic, it was gradually electrified from 1960 onwards. This required the enlargement of the Heiligenberg tunnel. Work was carried out with trains running, with one side of the tunnel being widened at a time with the affected track blockaded. This delayed the introduction of the electrical operation, which eventually commenced on 12 March 1964.

The loading gauge was enlarged to allow the introduction of TGV services between November 2001 and May 2002. This was achieved by the installation of ballastless track using the Getrac A3 system, which allowed a lowering of the superstructure by 20 cm because of its lower profile. It was designed by Kirchner on behalf of the DB AG Regionalbüro Südwest, Stuttgart and cost €3.1 million.

A railway accident occurred in the Heiligenberg Tunnel on 28 June 1988. One passenger was killed on the D 2754 express (Heidelberg–Saarbrücken). 10 people had major and 28 had minor injuries. After a violent storm, part of the retaining wall east of the Heiligenberg Tunnel fell onto the tracks towards Mannheim. A freight train loaded with bulk goods from Saarbrücken ran into the rubble and partly derailed; the locomotive and three wagons were forced onto the track. An express train running immediately after it then ran straight into the damaged vehicles.

== Sources ==
=== References ===
- Engbarth, Fritz (2007). Von der Ludwigsbahn zum Integralen Taktfahrplan – 160 Jahre Eisenbahn in der Pfalz [From the Ludwig Railway to the Integral Timetable—160 years of Railways in the Palatinate] (in German).
- Sturm, Heinz (2005). Die pfälzischen Eisenbahnen [The Palatine Railways] (in German). Ludwigshafen am Rhein: pro MESSAGE. ISBN 3-934845-26-6.
