= Verkehrsverbund Rhein-Neckar =

Public transport network in Germany

Verkehrsverbund-Rhein-Neckar GmbH
- Company type: Gesellschaft mit beschränkter Haftung (GmbH)
- Industry: Public transport
- Founded: December 1, 1989; 36 years ago
- Headquarters: Mannheim, Germany
- Area served: Rhine Neckar Area
- Website: www.vrn.de

The Verkehrsverbund Rhein-Neckar (VRN) is a transport association covering parts of the German states of Baden-Württemberg, Rhineland-Palatinate and Hesse in south-west Germany. Founded in 1989, it initially served the Rhein Neckar Area, but has since grown beyond its borders to cover an oblong area of 10,000 km^{2} with a population of 3 million, including Mannheim and Ludwigshafen, Heidelberg, Kaiserslautern, the entire Palatinate Forest and the northernmost parts of Baden-Württemberg. VRN tickets can also be used for journeys to and from several neighbouring areas, including the French town of Wissembourg.

The VRN is owned by the three states, cities and rural districts whose area it serves. The public transport companies that operate the network are organized in a second company, Unternehmensgesellschaft Verkehrsverbund Rhein-Neckar GmbH (URN). URN member DB Regio operates standard gauge rail transport in the area; other URN members operate buses and trams. This includes the largest German metre gauge rail network, which connects Bad Dürkheim, Mannheim, Ludwigshafen, Heidelberg and Weinheim.

== See also ==
- Rhein-Neckar-Verkehr
