= Weingut Fritz Haag =

German winery

- Location: Brauneberg, Germany
- Appellation: Mosel (wine region)
- Founded: 1605
- Key people: Oliver Haag, Jessica Haag
- Cases/yr: 5,500
- Varietal: Riesling
- Website: http://www.weingut-fritz-haag.de/

Weingut Fritz Haag

Weingut Fritz Haag is a German wine grower and producer based in Brauneberg, in the wine-growing region of Mosel, Germany.

== History ==
The first record of the Fritz Haag estate is from 1605, with the Haag family having continuous ownership since that point.

Wilhelm Haag returned to the estate in 1957, due to his father Fritz being ill. Wilhelm intended to work one vintage before returning to studying in Austria, but this did not occur and he continued to work at the estate on a full-time basis. Wilhelm was named German Winemaker of the Year in 1994 by the Gault Millau Guide to German Wines.

Wilhelm retired in 2005 and the responsibility for the wine making was passed on to his younger son Oliver Haag. Oliver had graduated with a degree in oenology at Geisenheim College, and undertaken apprenticeships at Dönnhoff and Karthäuserhof. Oliver runs the winery with his wife Jessica. Oliver's older brother, Thomas Haag, has owned and run Weingut Schloss Lieser since 1993. Both are member of the Geisenheim Alumni Association.

In 2008, Weingut Fritz Haag was awarded "Collection of the Year" by both Gault Millau and Wein-Gourmet magazine.

Weingut Fritz Haag is a member of the Verband Deutscher Prädikatsweingüter (VDP). Wilhelm Haag was formerly chairman of the Grosser Ring VDP Mosel from 1984 to 2004 and continues as an honorary chairman.

== Vineyards and wine ==
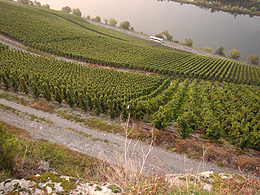
Brauneberger Juffer, an important vineyard for Fritz Haag

Weingut Fritz Haag owns a total of 19.5 hectares of Riesling vines around Brauneberg, with 6.5 hectares within Brauneberger Juffer and 3 hectares in the Brauneberger Juffer-Sonnenuhr vineyard. Wine writers Stephen Brook and Stephan Reinhardt both consider the parcels in the Brauneberger Juffer-Sonnenuhr site to be the best owned by Fritz Haag, with Reinhardt stating that the "Juffer vineyard has slightly heavier soils, so the wines are a little bit less refined ... but still of excellent quality".

Stephen Brook says that the estate's "forte lies in the superb range of sweeter styles, all produced without Süssreserve" and that the wines have "tremendous concentration, a bracing minerality, astounding depth of flavour, fine racy acidity and great longevity".

Fritz Haag uses both old oak and stainless steel at the discretion of the winemaker and indigenous yeast is used for the fermentation process.

The average annual production is around 5,500 cases of wine, dependent upon the conditions of each vintage. Wines are produced at all Prädikat levels, as well as top level dry wines designated as Grosses Gewächs.

== Assessment ==
- Tamlyn Currin ranks a Brauneberger Riesling Kabinett 2017 Mosel Ortswein among the very, very good value wines in Germany for Jancis Robinson
