= Prüm (disambiguation) =

Prüm, sometimes spelled Pruem, may mean one of the following:

== Places ==
- Prüm, a town in Rhineland-Palatinate, Germany
- Prüm (Verbandsgemeinde), an administrative district around Prüm
- Prüm (river), a river in Rhineland-Palatinate, Germany
- Abbey of Prüm, a former abbey near the town of Prüm

== People ==
- Pierre Prüm, the 14th Prime Minister of Luxembourg
- Émile Prüm, a Luxembourgian politician and father of Pierre Prüm
- Regino of Prüm, a Benedictine monk and chronicler at the Abbey of Prüm
- Richard Prum, an evolutionary biologist and ornithologist

== Other ==
- The Prüm Convention, a security information-sharing agreement signed by several EU member states at Prüm, Germany
- Weingut Joh. Jos. Prüm a wine estate in the Mosel wine region of Germany.
