= Weingut Wittmann =

German winery

- Location: Westhofen, Germany
- Appellation: Rheinhessen
- Founded: 1663
- Key people: Günter Wittmann, Philipp Wittmann
- Known for: Morstein
- Varietal: Riesling
- Website: www.weingutwittmann.de/en/

Weingut Wittmann

Weingut Wittmann is a German wine grower and producer based Westhofen, in the Wonnegau district of the wine-growing region of Rheinhessen, Germany. Weingut Wittmann is a member of the Verband Deutscher Prädikatsweingüter (VDP) since 1998.

== History ==
The Wittmann family winery was first mentioned in 1663 as leasehold estate of the Electoral Palatine ″Seehof″. The bottling of their own wines started in 1921. During the 1960s Georg and Irmgard Wittmann profiled the viticultural part of their typical craft ″Rhinehesse mixed farm″.

The owners Günter and Elisabeth Wittman started the environmentally sustainable turnaround already in the 1980s and changed over to organic viticulture. After an episode within the Ecovin movement, the winery is belonging to the Naturland association of organic farmers since 1990.

== Vineyards and wine ==
Wittmann works with 28 hectares vineyards, including vines in Morstein, Aulerde and Kirchspiel. These are selected sites, capable to produce ″Grosses Gewächs″, top-level dry wines. Chief enologist is the Geisenheimer Philipp Wittmann.
