= Willi Schaefer =

Coordinates: 49°56′03″N 7°03′50″E

- Location: Graach, Germany
- Appellation: Mosel (wine region)
- Key people: Willi Schaefer, Christopher Schaefer
- Cases/yr: 2000-3000
- Varietal: Riesling

Willi Schaefer

Willi Schaefer is a German wine grower and producer based in Graach, in the wine-growing region of Mosel, Germany.

== History ==
The Schaefer family believe their viticulture roots in Graach extend back to 1121, with documentation from 1590.

The current winery came into the hands of the Schaefer family in 1950 and Willi Schaefer took over as the winemaker in 1971.

Willi Schaefer has been a member of the Verband Deutscher Prädikatsweingüter since 1993. In 1997, Schaefer was awarded "Newcomer of the Year" by the Gault Millau wine guide.

Since 2001 Willi Schaefer's son Christoph, and Christoph's wife Andrea have been assisting with running the winery.

== Vineyards and wine ==
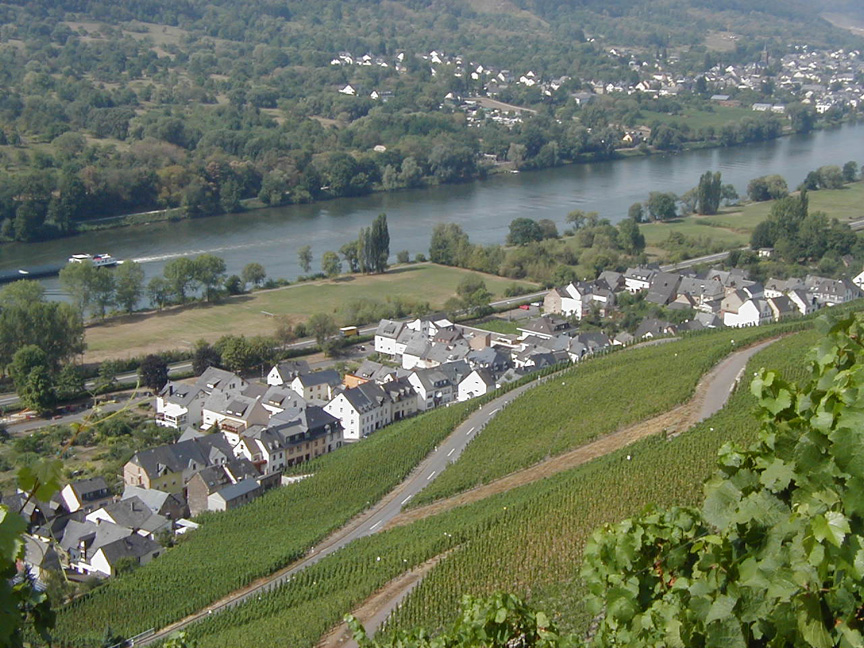
Vineyards above the town of Graach.

Willi Schaefer works with 3 hectares of Riesling vineyards, including vines in Graacher Himmelreich, Graacher Domprobst and Wehlener Sonnenuhr. Wine writers Stephen Brook and Stephan Reinhardt are of the opinion that the best wines from this estate are usually produced from the Graacher Domprobst parcels. The oldest vines are around 60 years of age and 60-70% of the vines are ungrafted, resulting in low yields.

The wines ferment and are matured for around six months on lees in old 1000 litre foudres before bottling.

Around 2000 to 3000 cases of wine are produced each year. Only a very small number are made in a Trocken or off-dry style and Schaefer avoids the presence of too much botrytis influence in his sweet wines where permissible.
