= Iron Gate Private Wine Management =

Canadian wine storage

Iron Gate Wine
- Type: Private company
- Industry: Wine collection sales, storage and services
- Founded: 2004
- Headquarters: Toronto, Canada
- Number of locations: 3
- Key people: Warren F. Porter
- Number of employees: 15
- Website: www.irongate.wine

Iron Gate Private Wine Management is a Canadian wine storage, wine auction and collector services company which operates a 150,000-bottle subterranean storage facility and sells wine for their collector clients. The facility is 6,000 square feet in size and located 20 feet under ground. Iron Gate typically stores larger wine collections.

== History ==
Iron Gate was founded by the Canadian businessman and wine enthusiast Warren F. Porter in 2004.

In 2006, Iron Gate acquired wine storage competitor Urban Cellars Inc and launched the "bag-a-cork" initiative in cooperation with the Girl Guides of Canada. Iron Gate was featured in Episode 2 of the television show Risky Business with W. Brett Wilson of Dragon's Den fame.

In 2010, the company integrated the new version of eSommelier that enables their collectors to value their wine and calculate their Robert Parker maturity date. In February 2011, Iron Gate organized an auction on behalf of the wine collector Ian Grant at the Spoke Club in Toronto.

In 2017 Iron Gate launched its online retail channel Irongate.wine, selling wine collections from the cellars of Canadians to US and international wine collectors.

In 2021 Iron Gate launched Canada's first auction dedicated to wine and spirits and as of YE2022 became the largest wine auction in the country with auctions frequently hammering over $1,000,000 per sale.

== Activities ==
Iron Gate Private Wine Management is a Canada-based company that provides wine storage services to wine collectors. The company also sells the stocked wine on the behalf of its collectors.

In connection with wine auctioneer Stephen Ranger, Iron Gate runs wine auctions and other related events. In 2007, Iron Gate organized the largest private order wine tasting in Toronto and in 2011 put on the first ever wine auction in Ontario.
