= Weingut Joh. Jos. Prüm =

German winery

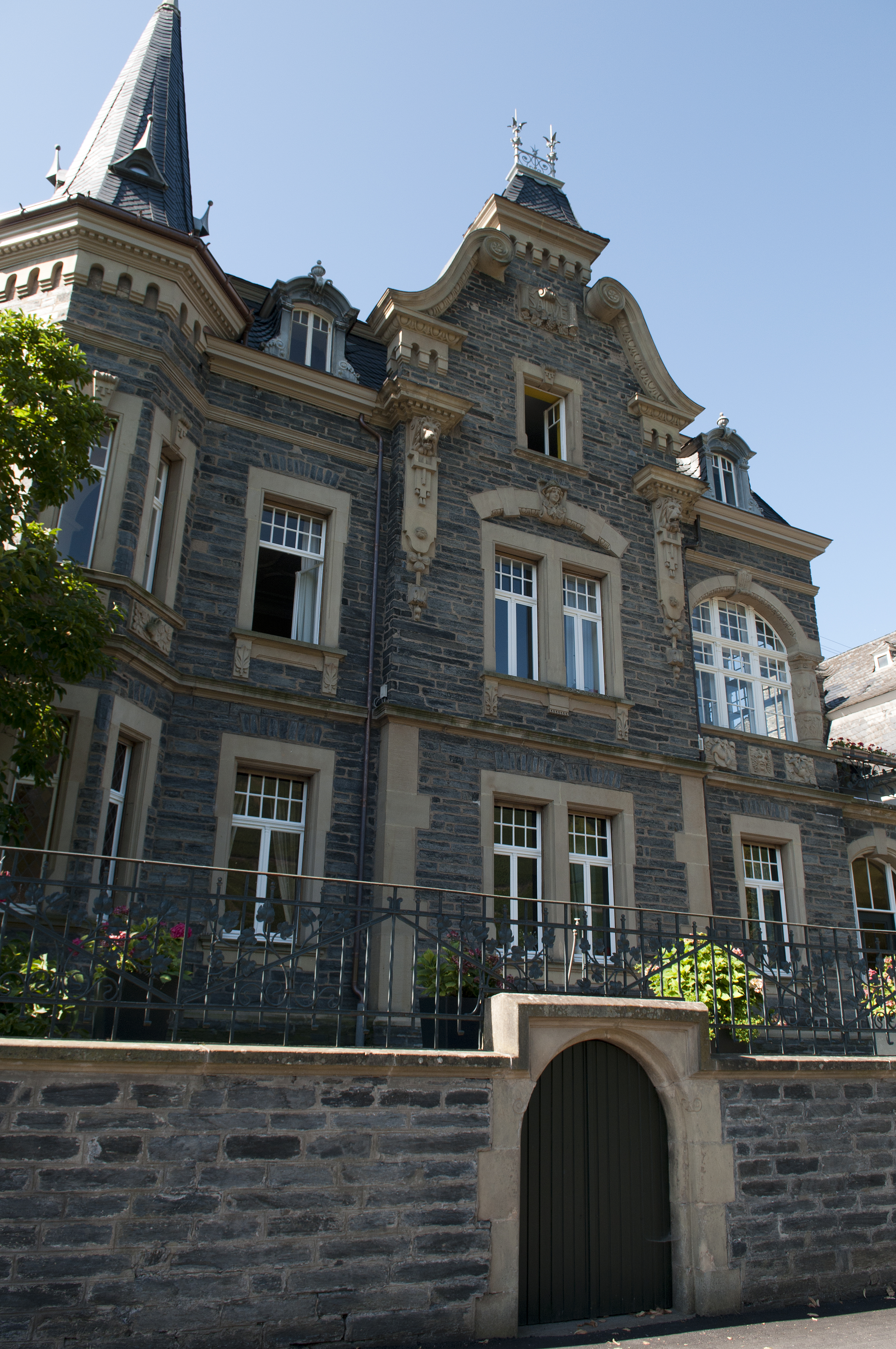
- Location: Wehlen, Germany
- Appellation: Mosel
- Founded: 1911
- Key people: Dr Manfred Prüm, Wolfgang Prüm, Dr Katharina Prüm
- Cases/yr: 10,000
- Varietal: Riesling
- Website: http://www.jjpruem.com/

Weingut Joh. Jos. Prüm

Weingut Joh. Jos. Prüm (Note: "Joh. Jos." is a traditional abbreviation for "Johann Josef".) is a German wine grower and producer based in Bernkastel-Wehlen, in the wine-growing region of Mosel, Germany.

== History ==
The Prüm family have had a presence in Wehlen for over 400 years. The estate was founded in 1911 by Johann Josef Prüm, after the splitting up of the S.A Prum winery. In 1920, Johann Josef's son, Sebastian, started working for the estate. Robert M. Parker, Jr. says that the estate's reputation was largely built by Sebastian and that he "developed the distinct style of the Prüm wines during the 1930s and 1940s". Sebastian died in 1969 and his sons, Dr Manfred Prüm and his younger brother Wolfgang Prüm, took over. Manfred has been working with his daughter Dr Katharina Prüm since 2003. Manfred Prüm was named German Winemaker of the Year in 1996 by the Gault Millau Guide to German Wines.

J.J. Prüm is a member of the Verband Deutscher Prädikatsweingüter (VDP).

== Vineyards and wine ==
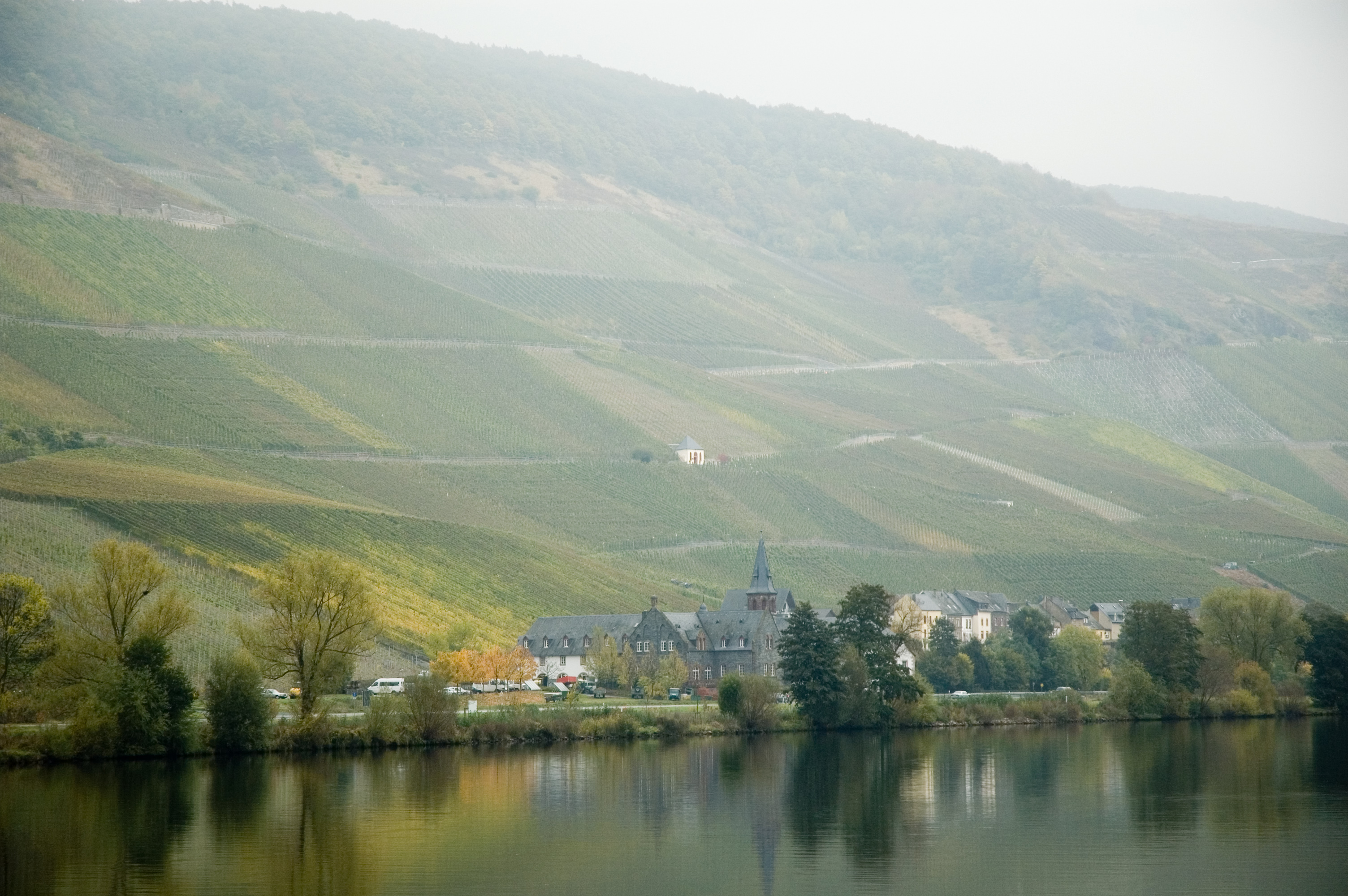
Looking toward the Graacher Himmelreich vineyard

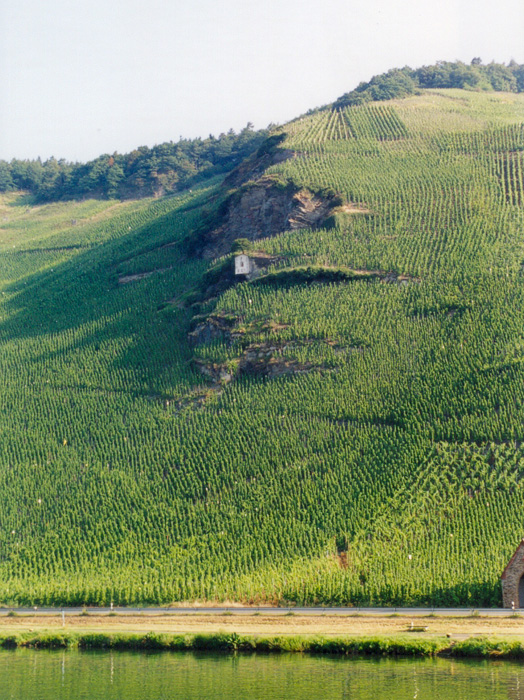
The eponymous sundial in the Wehlener Sonnenuhr vineyard

The estate has 14 hectares (35 acres) of holdings in the Wehlener Sonnenuhr, Graacher Himmelreich, Bernkasteler Lay, Bernkasteler Badstube and Zeltinger Sonnenuhr vineyards. Only Riesling is grown and harvested at these sites by Joh. Jos. Prüm. The most important of these sites are Wehlener Sonnenuhr and Graacher Himmelreich, in terms of both quantity and quality for the winery. Seventy percent of the vines are ungrafted.

Depending on the vintage, the average annual production is 10,000 to 13,000 cases of wine.

Stuart Pigott says of J.J. Prüm that "since the early 1920s its wines have been among Germany's best Rieslings with the Mosel's vivacious aroma and racy elegance in its highest form" and wine writer Stephen Brook says that "The wines, whether a modest Kabinett or an opulent Beerenauslese, are the epitome of filigree elegance: light in body but intense in flavour, exquisitely balanced and precisely tuned, and capable of the most extra-ordinary longevity".
