= Verband Deutscher Prädikatsweingüter =

German winery association

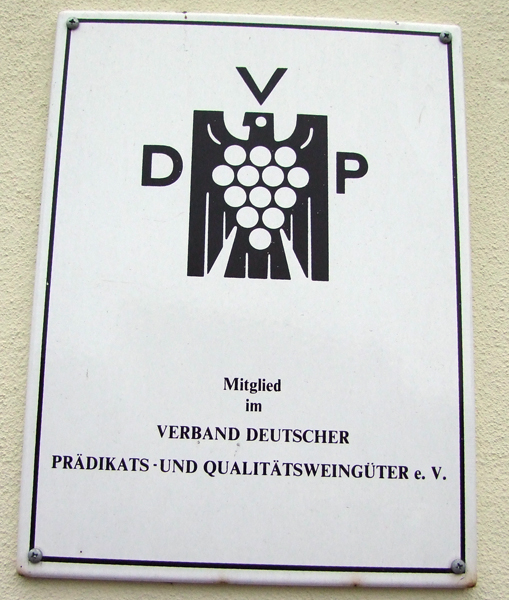
A sign showing that a winery is a member of VDP

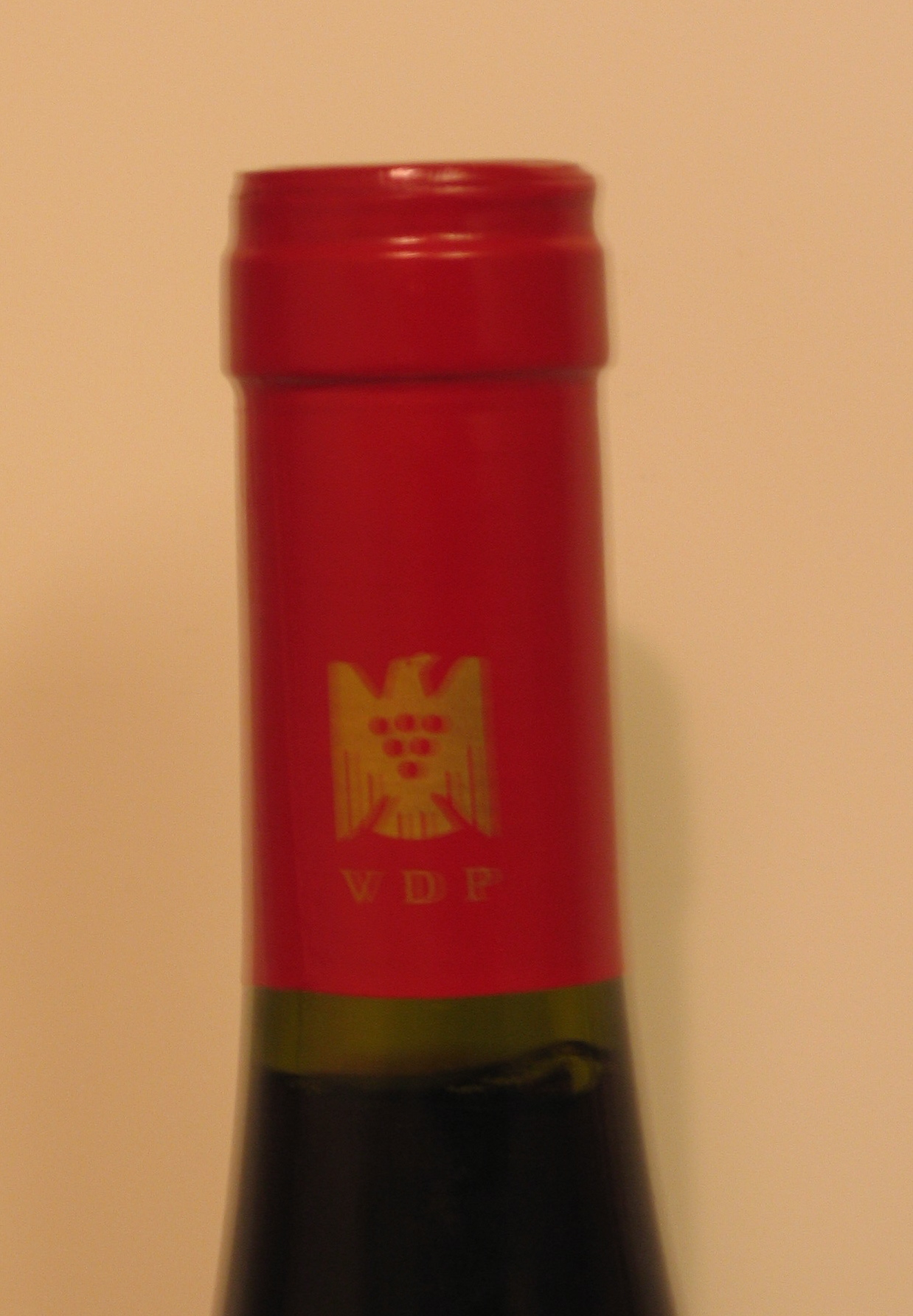
VDP logotype on the capsule of a wine bottle

Verband Deutscher Prädikatsweingüter e.V. or the Association of German Prädikat Wine Estates, is an association of more than 200 wineries in Germany that promotes binding quality standards and – since 1990 – also ecological management of its members' wineries. Many of Germany's top wine producers are members. It is commonly known by its abbreviation VDP.

== History ==
It was founded in 1910 as Verband Deutscher Naturweinversteigerer e.V., Association of German Natural (i.e. not chaptalized) Wine Auctioneers. Founding members were the four regional associations

- Association of Natural Wine Auctioneers of the Rhine Palatinate, founded in 1908
- Rheingau Vineyard Owners Association, founded in 1897 in Rüdesheim on the Rhine
- Trier Association of Vineyard Owners of Mosel, Saar and Ruwer, founded probably in 1910
- Association of natural wine auctioneers in Rheinhessen, founded in 1910.

It consists of 11 regional associations, one for each region in the German wine classification system.

== Classification ==
In order to be a VDP member, a wine estate must adhere to certain standards which are slightly more stringent than those set down in the German wine law. VDP members may (and almost always do) use the VDP logotype, a stylized eagle with a cluster of grapes, on their wine bottles. Also, the members have access to the new VDP-specific classifications Erste Lage and Grosses Gewächs for top dry wines that fulfill the requirements. VDP and its regional associations also arrange German wine auctions and various marketing events.

Especially in the Mosel region, where the regional VDP association is known as Grosser Ring, several well-renowned wine estates are instead members of Bernkasteler Ring, which arranges similar auctions and marketing events.

In July 2018, the members adopted a sparkling wine classification that, like the wine classification, defines quality according to origin and provides for aging on the lees as an additional quality criterion. Accordingly, the focus is on origin with the qualitatively increasing levels of VDP-Gutssekt, VDP-Ortssekt, VDP-Erste Lage and VDP-Große Lage. The fruit must be grown in the estate of a VDP member and be produced specifically for Sekt production. The fruit must be picked early by hand, whole cluster pressed, and the wine made by the traditional method only. For non-vintage VDP Sekt, sparkling wines must lie on their lees for at least 15 months, vintage sparkling wines for 24 months and VDP Sekt Prestige for at least 36 months.

== Member estates ==
(As of 2019):

Ahr:

- Weingut Adeneuer
- Burggarten
- Deutzerhof
- Weingut Kreuzberg
- Weingut Meyer-Näkel
- Weingut Nelles
- Rotweingut Jean Stodden

Baden:

- Weingut Markgraf von Baden
- Weingut Bercher
- Weingut Blankenhorn
- Staatsweingut Freiburg & Blankenhornsberg
- Weingut Burg Ravensburg
- Weingut Freiherr von und zu Franckenstein
- Weingut Dr. Heger
- Weingut Heitlinger
- Weingut Reichsgraf und Marquis zu Hoensbroech
- Weingut Bernhard Huber
- Weingut Stadt Lahr
- Weingut Andreas Laible
- Weingut Lämmlin-Schindler
- Weingut Michel
- Weingut Franz Keller Schwarzer Adler
- Weingut Schloss Neuweier
- Weingut Burg Ravensburg
- Weingut Salwey
- Weingut Seeger
- Privat-Weingut Schlumberger-Bernhart
- Weingut Schlör
- Weingut Stigler
- Weingut Wöhrle
Franconia:
- Weingut Johann Arnold
- Weingut Wilhelm Arnold
- Weingut Bickel-Stumpf
- Bürgerspital zum Heiligen Geist
- Fürstlich Castell'sches Domänenamt
- Weingut Michael Fröhlich
- Weingut Rudolf Fürst
- Weingut Glaser-Himmelstoss
- Staatlicher Hofkeller Würzburg
- Weingut Höfler
- Weingut Juliusspital
- Weingut Stadt Klingenberg - Benedikt Baltes
- Weingut A.F. Kreglinger
- Weingut Fürst Löwenstein
- Weingut Rudolf May
- Weingut Max Müller I
- Weingut Johann Ruck
- Weingut Horst Sauer
- Weingut Rainer Sauer
- Weingut Egon Schäffer
- Weingut Schmitt's Kinder
- Weingut Schwab
- Weingut Zur Schwane
- Weingut Schloss Sommerhausen
- Weingut am Stein
- Steintal
- Weingut Störrlein Krenig
- Weingut Paul Weltner
- Weingut Hans Wirsching
- Weingut Zehnthof

Hessische Bergstraße:

- Hessische Staatsweingüter Kloster Eberbach

Mittelrhein:

- Weingut Bastian
- Weingut Toni Jost – Hahnenhof
- Weingut Lanius-Knab
- Weingut Matthias Müller
- Weingut Ratzenberger

Mosel:

- Weingut Clemens Busch
- Weingut Joh. Jos. Christoffel Erben
- Weingut Dr. Fischer
- Weingut Le Gallais
- Weingut Forstmeister Geltz-Zilliken
- Weingut Grans-Fassian
- Weingut Fritz Haag
- Weingut Willi Haag
- Weingut Haart
- Weingut Herrenberg
- Weingut Heymann-Löwenstein
- Weingut Karthäuserhof
- Weingut Knebel
- Weingut Reichsgraf von Kesselstatt
- Peter Lauer
- Weingut Schloss Lieser
- Weingut Dr. Loosen
- Weingut Egon Müller-Scharzhof
- Maximin Grünhaus
- Josef Milz
- Weingut von Othegraven
- Weingut Piedmont
- Weingut Joh. Jos. Prüm
- Weingut S.A. Prüm
- Weingut Schloss Saarstein
- Weingut Willi Schäfer
- Weingut Studert-Prüm
- Weingut Wwe. Dr. H. Thanisch Erben
- Weingut Sankt Urbans-Hof
- Weingut Vereinigte Hospitien
- Weingut van Volxem
- Weingüter Gemeinrat J. Wegeler

Nahe:

- Weingut Dr. Crusius
- Weingut Schlossgut Diel
- Weingut Dönnhoff
- Weingut Emrich-Schönleber
- Weingut Kruger-Rumpf
- Gut Herrmannsberg
- Weingut Prinz Salm
- Johann Baptist Schäfer
- Weingut Schäfer-Fröhlich

Rheingau:

- Weingut Fritz Allendorf
- Wein- und Sektgut Barth
- Weingut C. Belz
- Weingut Jakob Jung
- Diefenhardt'sches Weingut
- Hessische Staatsweingüter Kloster Eberbach
- Weingut Erbslöh
- Weingut August Eser
- Weingut Bernhard Eser
- Weingut Friedrich Fendel
- Weingut in der Straßenmühle
- Weingut Hochschule Geisenheim University
- Weingut Alexander Freimuth
- Weingut Georg Müller Stiftung
- Weingut Jakob Hamm
- Weingut Prinz von Hessen
- Weingut Hupfeld
- Weinbaudomäne Schloss Johannisberg
- Johannishof
- Weingut Jakob Jung
- Weingut Flick
- Weingut Freimuth
- Weingut Hamm
- Weingut Kaufmann
- Weingut Graf von Kanitz
- Weingut August Kesseler
- Weingut Baron Knyphausen
- Weingut Robert König
- Weingut Krone Assmannshausen
- Weingut Peter Jakob Kühn
- Weingut Künstler
- Weingut Lorenz H. Kunz
- Weingut Hans Lang
- Weingut Josef Leitz
- Weingut Johannishof
- Weingut Fürst Löwenstein
- Weingut Detlev Ritter und Edler von Oetinger
- Weingut Prinz
- Weingut Querbach
- Weingut Balthasar Ress
- Weingut F.B. Schönleber
- Weingut Joseph Spreitzer
- Weingut Schloss Vollrads
- Weingüter Wegeler
- Weingut Robert Weil
- Domdechant Werner'sches Weingut

Rheinhessen:

- Weingut St. Antony
- Weingut Battenfeld Spanier
- Weingut Bischel
- Weingut Brüder Dr. Becker
- Weingut K. F. Groebe
- Weingut Gunderloch
- Weingut Gutzler
- Weingut Keller
- Weingut Kühling Gillot
- Weingut J. Neus
- Weingut Rappenhof
- Weingut Schätzel
- Staatliche Weinbaudomäne Rheinland-Pfalz (Oppenheim)
- Weingut Villa Sachsen
- Weingut Wagner-Stempel
- Schloss Westerhaus
- Weingut Winter
- Weingut Wittmann

Palatinate:

- Weingut Acham-Magin
- Weingut Geheimer Rat Dr. von Bassermann-Jordan
- Weingut Friedrich Becker
- Weingut Bergdolt
- Weingut Bernhart
- Weingut Dr. Bürklin-Wolf
- Weingut Reichsrat von Buhl
- Weingut A. Christmann
- Weingut Fitz-Ritter
- Weingut Henninger IV
- Weingut Knipser
- Weingut Kranz
- Weingut Herbert Meßmer
- Weingut Georg Mosbacher
- Weingut Müller-Catoir
- Weingut Münzberg
- Weingut Mugler
- Weingut Pfeffingen
- Weingut Philipp Kuhn
- Weingut Ökonomierat Rebholz
- Weingut Rings
- Weingut Karl Schaefer
- Weingut Georg Siben Erben
- Weingut Siegrist
- Weingut Theo Minges
- Weingüter Geheimrat J. Wegeler
- Weingut Dr. Wehrheim
- Weingut von Winning

Saale-Unstrut:

- Wengut Hey
- Weingut Lützkendorf
- Weingut Pawis

Saxony:

- Schloss Proschwitz
- Klaus Zimmerling

Württemberg:

- Weingut Gerhard Aldinger
- Weingut Beurer
- Graf von Bentzel-Sturmfeder Horneck'sches Weingut
- Weingut Dautel
- Weingut Drautz-Able
- Weingut Jürgen Ellwanger
- Weingut Graf Adelmann
- Weingut Karl Haidle
- Weingut Heid
- Weingut Schlossgut Hohenbeilstein
- Weingut Fürst zu Hohenlohe-Öhringen
- Weingut Kistenmache-Hengerer
- Weingut des Grafen Neipperg
- Weingut Rainer Schnaitmann
- Weingut Wachtstetter
- Staatsweingut Weinsberg
- Weingut Herzog von Württemberg
- Weingut Wöhrwag

== Maps ==
Members Verband Deutscher Prädikatsweingüter Rhineland-Palatinate
Rheingau Members Verband Deutscher Prädikatsweingüter
1 Allendorf
2 Barth
3 Belz
4 Jung
5 Diefenhardt
6 Eberbach
7 Erbslöh
8 Eser
9 Fendel
10 Straßenmühle
11 Hochschule Geisenheim
12 Freimuth
13 Müller
14 Hessen
15 Hupfeld
16 Johannisberg
17 Kaufmann
18 Kessler
19 Knyphausen
20 König
21 Krone
22 Kühn
23 Künstler
24 Kunz
25 Leitz
26 Löwenstein
27 Oettinger
28 Prinz
29 Querbach
30 Ress
31 Schönleber
32 Spreitzer
33 Vollrads
34 Weil
35 Werner
Members Verband Deutscher Prädikatsweingüter Baden-Württemberg
Members Verband Deutscher Prädikatsweingüter Bavaria
Franconia Members Verband Deutscher Prädikatsweingüter
1 Arnold
3 Bickel-Stumpf
4 Bürgerspital
5 Domänenamt
6 Michael
7 Fürst
8 Glaser
9 Hofkeller
10 Höfler
11 Juliusspital
12 Baltes
13 Kreglinger
14 Löwenstein
15 May
16 Müller
17 Ruck
18 Sauer
19 Schäffer
20 Schmitt's Kinder
21 Schwab
22 Schwane
23 Sommerhausen
24 Stein
25 Steintal
26 Störrlein
27 Weltner
28 Wirsching
29 Zehnthof

== See also ==
- German wine label
