= Elbling =

Variety of grape

- Grape (Vitis)
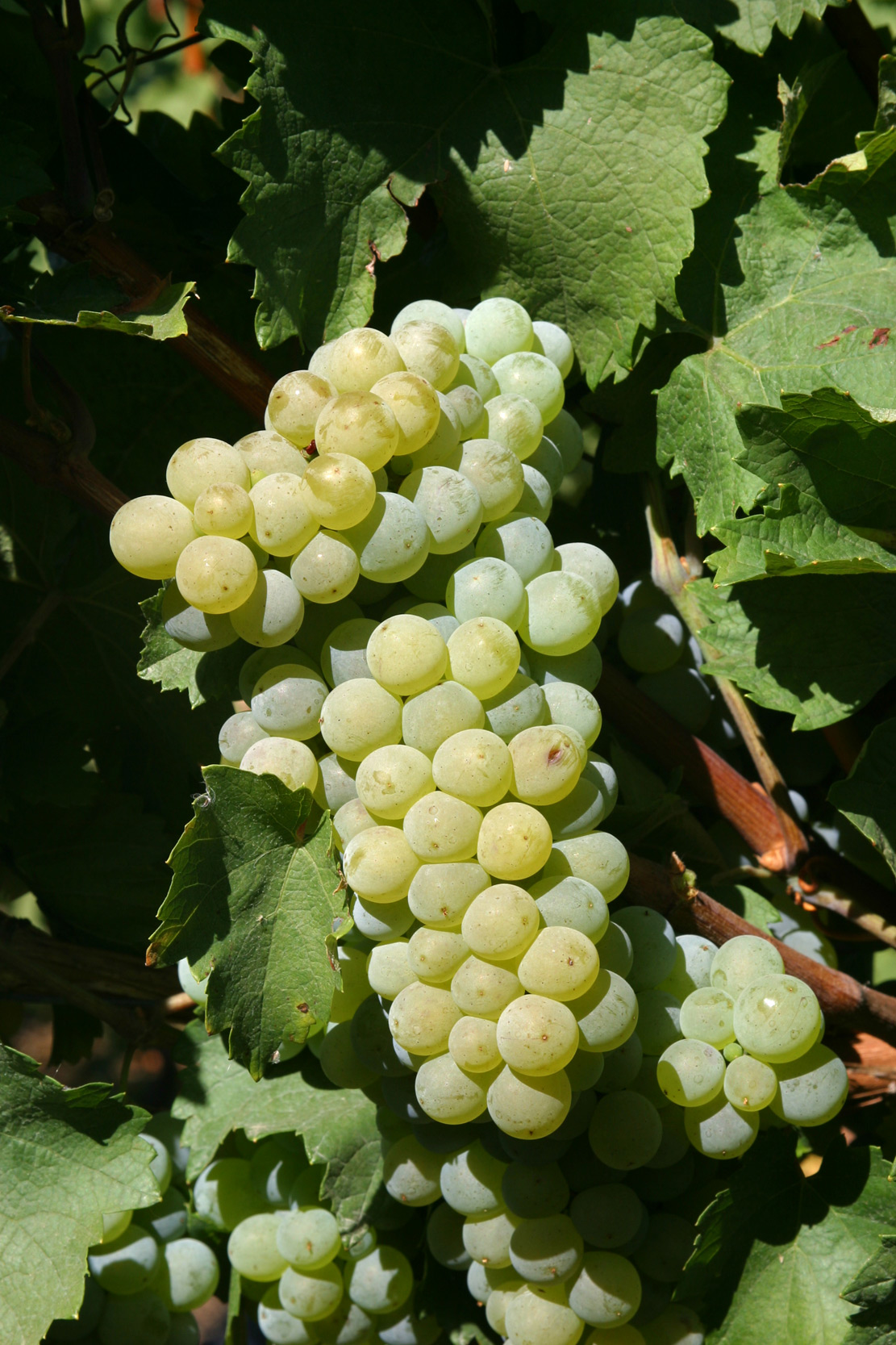
- Color of berry skin: Blanc
- Species: Vitis vinifera
- Also called: Weißer Elbling, Gelber Elbling and other synonyms
- Origin: probably Rhine, Germany
- Notable regions: Mosel, Luxembourg
- VIVC number: 3865

Elbling (German: [ˈɛlplɪŋ]) is a variety of white grape (sp. Vitis vinifera) which today is primarily grown in the upstream parts of the Mosel region in Germany and in Luxembourg, where the river is called Moselle. The variety has a long history, and used to cover much of Germany's vineyards from medieval times and was that country's most cultivated variety until the early 20th century, but has been in decline ever since. As of 2006, there were 583 hectares (1,440 acres) of Elbling vineyards in Germany, which made it the country's 23rd most grown variety of grape. Of that vineyard surface, 575 ha or 98.6% was found in the Mosel region In the same year, there were 122.9 hectares (304 acres) of Elbling grown in Luxembourg.

== History and origin ==
It has been speculated that Elbling was grown along Mosel already in Roman times, and that it could even be identical to the Vitis albuelis described by Columella in his De re rustica and the Vitis alba described by Pliny the Elder, although this has by no means been proven. Both Latin names mean "the white grape" and would then have been corrupted to Elbling at some later stage. DNA profiling has indicated that Elbling is an offspring of Gouais blanc (also known as Heunisch) and a cross between Traminer and some unidentified variety. This parentage is consistent with Elbling being an ancient grape variety, and incidentally, it is the same parentage as for Riesling. This parentage and history makes it likely that Elbling originated somewhere in the Rhine area.

== Wines ==
Elbling tends to give musts low in sugar, and wines high in acid and fairly neutral in character, which makes it primarily used for sparkling wine, such as non-varietally labelled Mosel Sekt. When made into varietal still wine, it gives a wine which has been compared to a lighter and more tart version of Silvaner. Varietal Elbling wine is most commonly found in Luxembourg.

== Synonyms ==
Elbling is known under the following synonyms: Albana, Albe, Alben, Albig, Albuelin, Albuelis, Allemand, Allemand Blanc, Alsacien, Alva, Argentin, Biela Zrebnina, Bielovacka, Bielovcka, Blesec, Blesez, Bourgeois, Burgauer, Burgeger, Burgegger, Burger, Burger Elbling, Burgundertraube Gruen, Burgyre, Dickelbling, Elbai Feher, Elbe, Elbele, Elben, Elben Feher, Elber, Elbling Weiss, Elbinger, Elmene, Facum, Facun, Facun Blanc, Farantbily, Faucun, Frankenthal Blanc, Gemeine Traube, Geschlachter Burger, Gonais Blanc, Gouais Blanc, Grobburger, Grobe, Grobriesling, Gros Blanc, Grossriesler, Grossriesling, Hartalbe, Haussard, Herblink, Heunisch Gruen, Isodora Brachybus, Klaemmer, Kleinbeer, Kleinbeere, Kleinberger, Klember, Klemmer, Klemplich, Kratkopeccelj, Kristaller, Kristeller, Kurzstingel, Kurzstingl, Kurzstingler, Le Gros, Luttenbershna, Marmont Vert, Marmot, Mehlweisse, Morawka, Mouillet, Naesslinger, Nuernberger Zaeh, Nuesslinger, Pecek, Pezhech, Pezhek, Plant Commun, Plant Madame, Raifrench, Rauhelbene, Reinfransch, Rheinalben, Rheinelbe, Seretonina, Silberweiss, Silvaner Weiss, Spizelbe, Srebonina, Suessgrober, Suessgrobes, Sussgrober, Tarant Bily, Tarant De Boheme, Verdin Blanc, Vert Blanc, Vert Doux, Weissalbe, Weisselben, Weisselbling, Weisser Dickelbling, Weisser Elbling, Weisser Sylvaner, Welsche, Welschel.
