= Schloss Westerhaus =

German winery

Weingut Schloss Westerhaus
- Location: Ingelheim am Rhein, Rheinhessen, Germany
- Coordinates: 49°56′21.2″N 8°3′32.9″E
- Appellation: Franconia
- Founded: 1900
- First vintage: 1900
- Key people: Johannes Graf von Schönburg, Toni Frank
- Distribution: national
- Tasting: open to public
- Website: www.schloss-westerhaus.de

Schloss Westerhaus is the largest estate in Rheinhessen. It is located on the hill Westerberg (Rheinhessen) near Großwinternheim borough of Ingelheim am Rhein. Today it is a well-known VDP winery and is run by the fourth generation. The vineyards consist of ancient shell limestone rocks and the winery's wine cellar is carved into the mountain, which is reminiscent of a stalactite cave in appearance, but is ideally suited as wine cellar. Weingut Schloss Westerhaus is a member of the Verband Deutscher Prädikatsweingüter (VDP).

== History ==
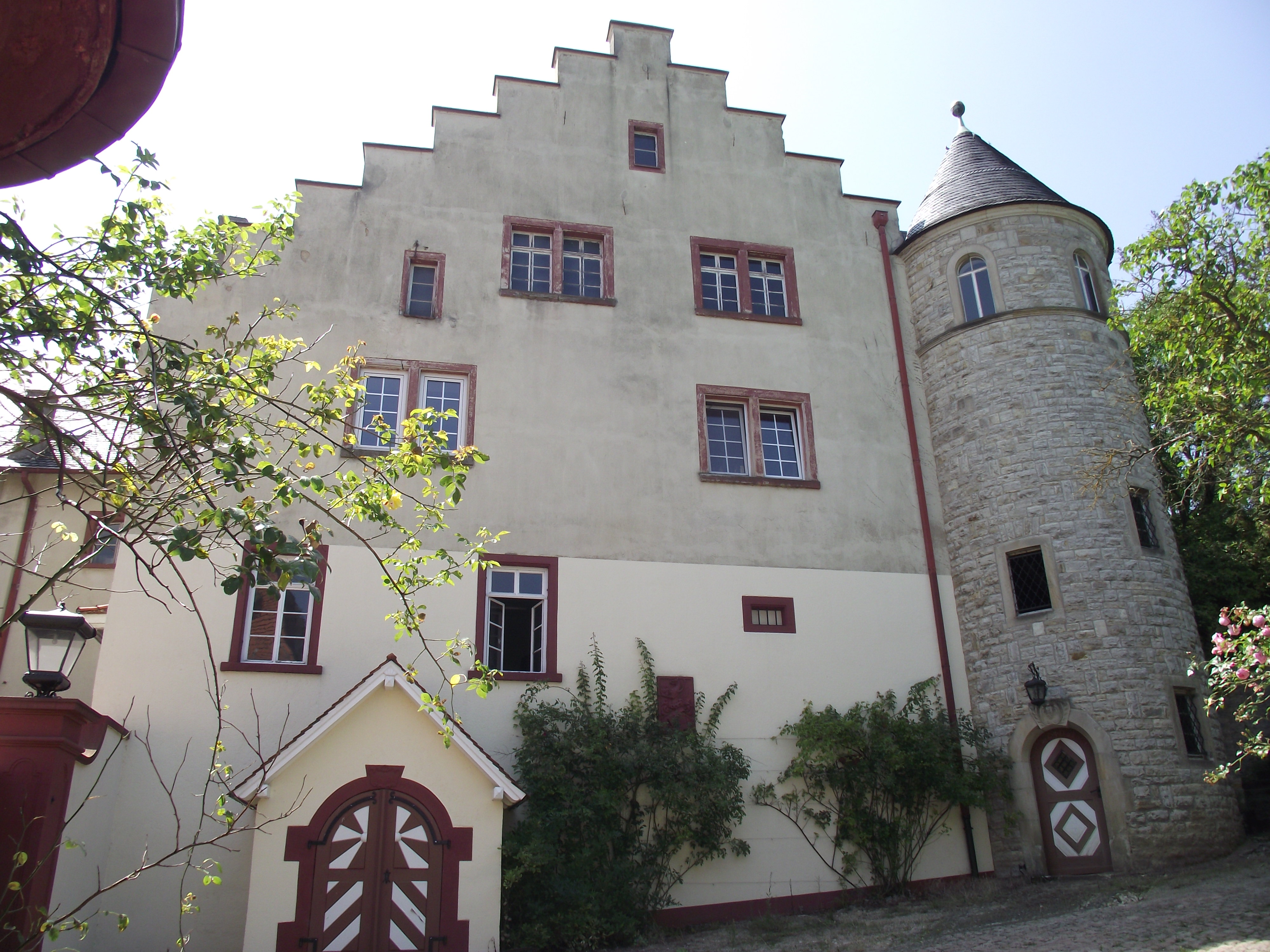
The heritage-protected mansion

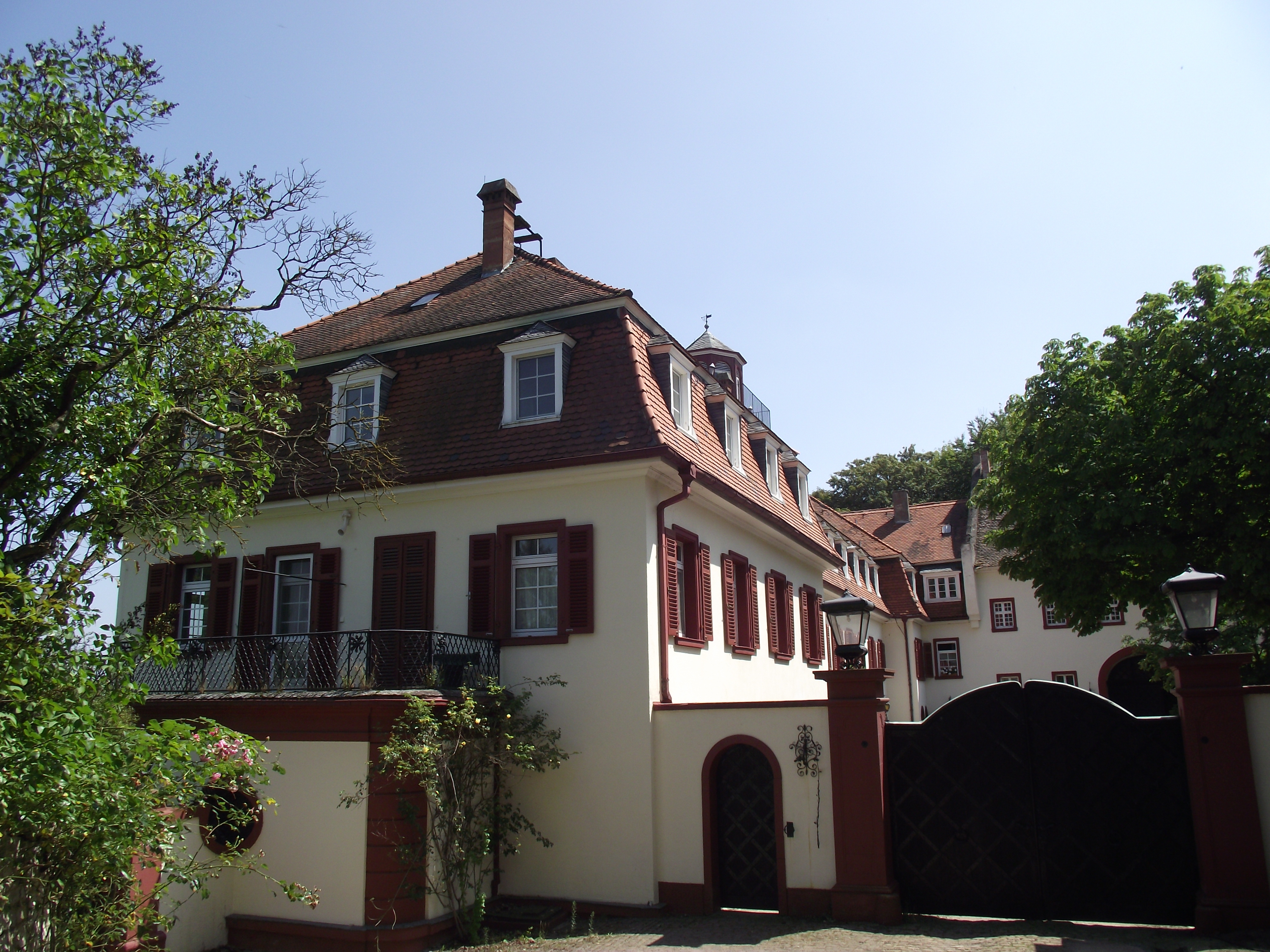
Eastern entry gate

In 1408, there is a first documentary mention of a ′Hus und ecker uff deme Westirberge′. It is assumed that the actual foundation dates back much longer and is connected with the foundation of Charlemagne's imperial palace in Ingelheim in the 8th century. The Rhineland-Palatinate General Directorate for Cultural Heritage assigns the first mention in its list of cultural monuments in Ingelheim am Rhein to the year 1190. The Counts of Bolanden and Ingelheim resided in Westerhaus mansion for over 600 years. As a fief of the Electorate of Palatinate, Schloss Westerhaus was owned by the Counts of Ingelheim for over 400 years until it was expropriated by French Revolutionary troops at the beginning of the 19th century.

On 4 October 1900, Heinrich Opel from Rüsselsheim, one of Adam Opel's five sons, acquired the estate in order to develop it into a model estate. His wife Emilie was one of several daughters of the Grand Ducal Hessian economist Friedrich Weber (1841–1917), tenant of the Hessian state domain Mönchhof near Kelsterbach and later owner of the Petersau estate.

At that time, the Westerhaus was difficult to reach and hard to farm. All supplies had to be transported by horse and ox cart up and down the Westerberg to the farmstead. A stiff westerly wind and the skeletal soil made farming difficult. The construction of a road began in 1916, when the military government of the Fortress of Mainz wanted to build another line of defence parallel to the Mainzer Berg; the Selzstellung was the last and most expensive defensive ring built for the fortress. First, a route was laid from Altegasse, Ingelheim, up to Westerhaus, and then the construction of a rack railway began. The aim was to protect the Westerberg to the east with ditches and fortifications against the French Third Republic. The railway was completed, but the fortification belt was not, as the military changed their plans. The railway was therefore removed again.

Heinrich von Opel had this route converted into a private road in 1920. His daughter Irmgard von Opel later provided an asphalt layer. The road was called the rackwheel-Chaussee for a long time afterwards. The appearance of the two-part complex with its castle courtyard and service yard is characterised by the conversion and extension work carried out between 1922 and 1927. The castle-like mansard hipped-roof building from the 1920s can be seen from afar in the valley. The ensemble is complemented by a terraced park with a water basin and enclosure. Among the outbuildings is a stepped gable building, probably built in the 16th or 17th century. Its stair tower and wine press house date from 1922. The massive barn with mansard roof was also built in the 1920s.

With the acquisition of the Eulenmühle mill and mill stream in the Selz Valley, the Opels secured water rights. The water was pumped up the mountain. The resulting irrigation and new agricultural methods such as deep ploughing and the first mechanisation significantly increased the economic success. For several years there was even a dwarf school at Westerhaus Castle, where eight children from four grades were taught. During the Second World War, a war hospital for horses and soldiers from all sides was established under the leadership of Irmgard von Opel. As a result, Schloss Westerhaus was never bombed.

The estate includes a stud farm with a striking indoor riding arena. In the 1930s, Irmgard von Opel was probably the best rider in the world at that time in cross-country riding and show jumping. She won many competitions at home and abroad, and in 1934 she was the first woman to win the German show jumping derby in Klein-Flottbek (now part of Hamburg) with her grey horse Nanuk. The Westerberg Stud monument zone was founded in 1912. It is characterised by park-like open spaces, paddocks and riding arenas surrounded by old trees. The loosened-up stately neo-baroque building group was essentially built between 1920 and the beginning of the 1930s. Today, the Westerberg Stud is one of the best thoroughbred studs in Germany.

== Vineyards and wine ==
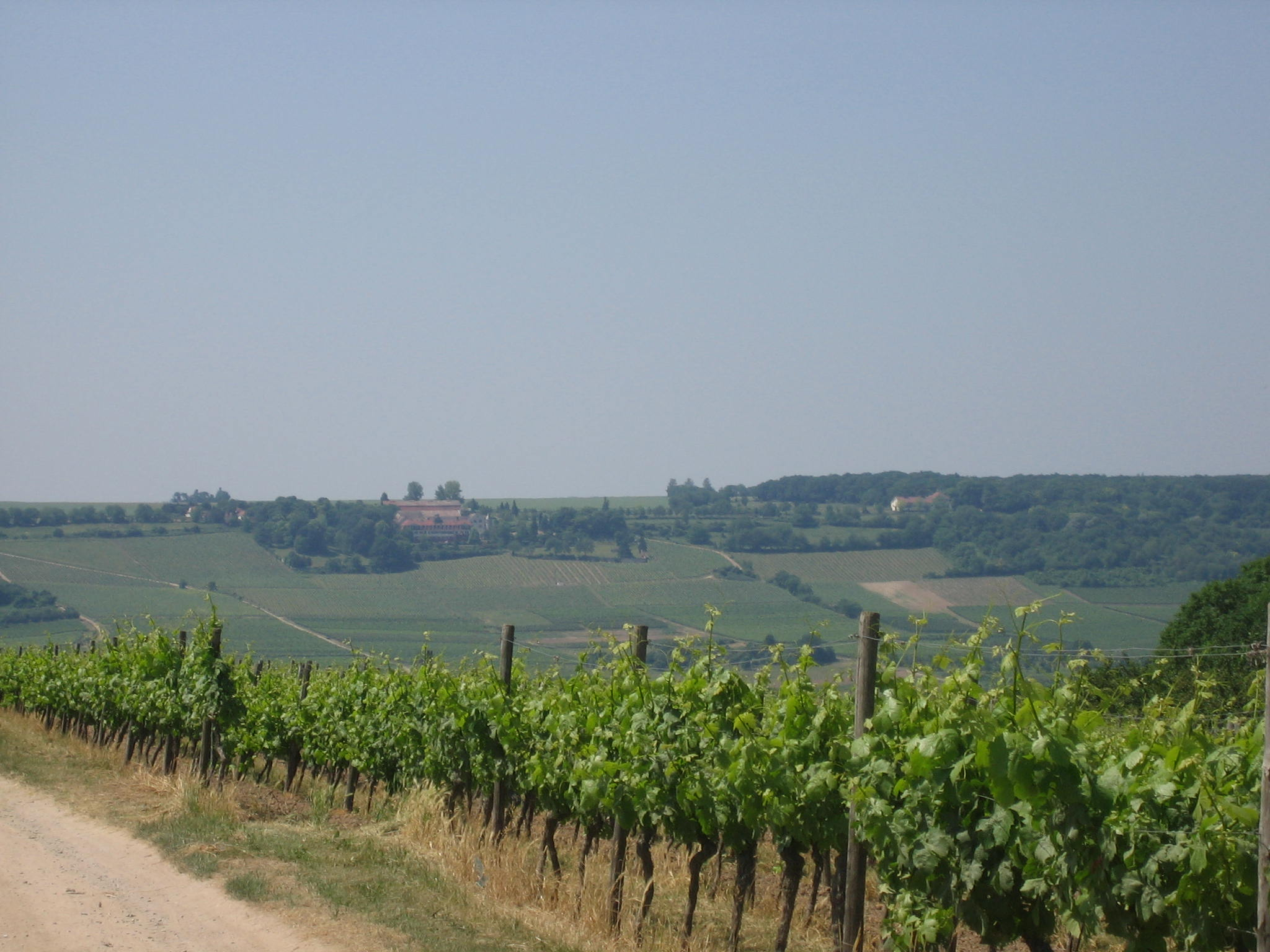
Schloss Westerhaus surrounded by vineyards

Today, the Schloss Westerhaus wine estate is the best-known part of the estate. In 1978, Heinz von Opel and his wife Claudia took over the Westerberg and since 1979 have opened it more and more to the public. They planted trees and invited walkers to enjoy the view from the hill and laid out a wine trail.

Since 2008, Ivonne Countess von Schönburg-Glauchau (née von Opel) and her husband Johannes Count von Schönburg-Glauchau have been the fourth generation to run the Schloss Westerhaus wine estate. The jazz events and the traditional 3-day courtyard festival at Whitsun, which are held in the grounds of the castle, are well-known and popular beyond the region. The Schloss Westerhaus wine estate is also part of the popular Ingelheim Red Wine Festival. Since 2019, the castle has also been the venue for the Rheingau Musik Festival.

The winery cultivates a total of 18 hectares of vineyards in the monopole Ingelheimer Schloss Westerhaus, as well as in the Sonnenhang, Schlossberg, Sonnenberg and Klostergarten sites. The soil and the entire Westerberg hill derived from primordial seas. A limestone reef with a thickness of 90 meters covered by 50 centimeters soil is the backbone of the terroir. Even today, shells and snails from millions of years ago can be found in the vineyard. 70% of the vineyard area is planted with Burgundy varieties, 30% with Riesling. Since 1983, the winery has been organised in the VDP, the Association of German Prädikat and Quality Wineries, in the regional association of Rheinhessen. Heinz von Opel, who died in 2006, was a board member of the VDP Rheinhessen and vice-president of the VDP federal association. The wines are characterised by their freshness and minerality.

== Reception ==
Schloss Westerhaus first appeared on the DM list of Germany's 100 best wineries in 1987, and since 1990 has repeatedly been ranked among the world's 1000 best estates. In Gault Millau wine guide, the winery is rated 3 grapes (2021) and was last rated as an up-and-comer in 2019. Further ratings can be found in the Vinum Weinguide (3 stars, 2021) and the Falstaff Weinguide Deutschland(3 stars, 2020 and 2022). Weingut Schloss Westerhaus was awarded two stars in Eichelmann Deutschlands Weine 2017
