= Dönnhoff =

German winery

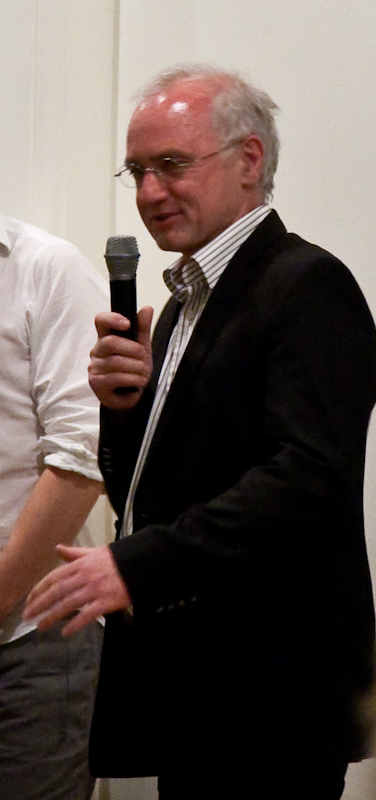
Helmut Dönnhoff at a wine tasting

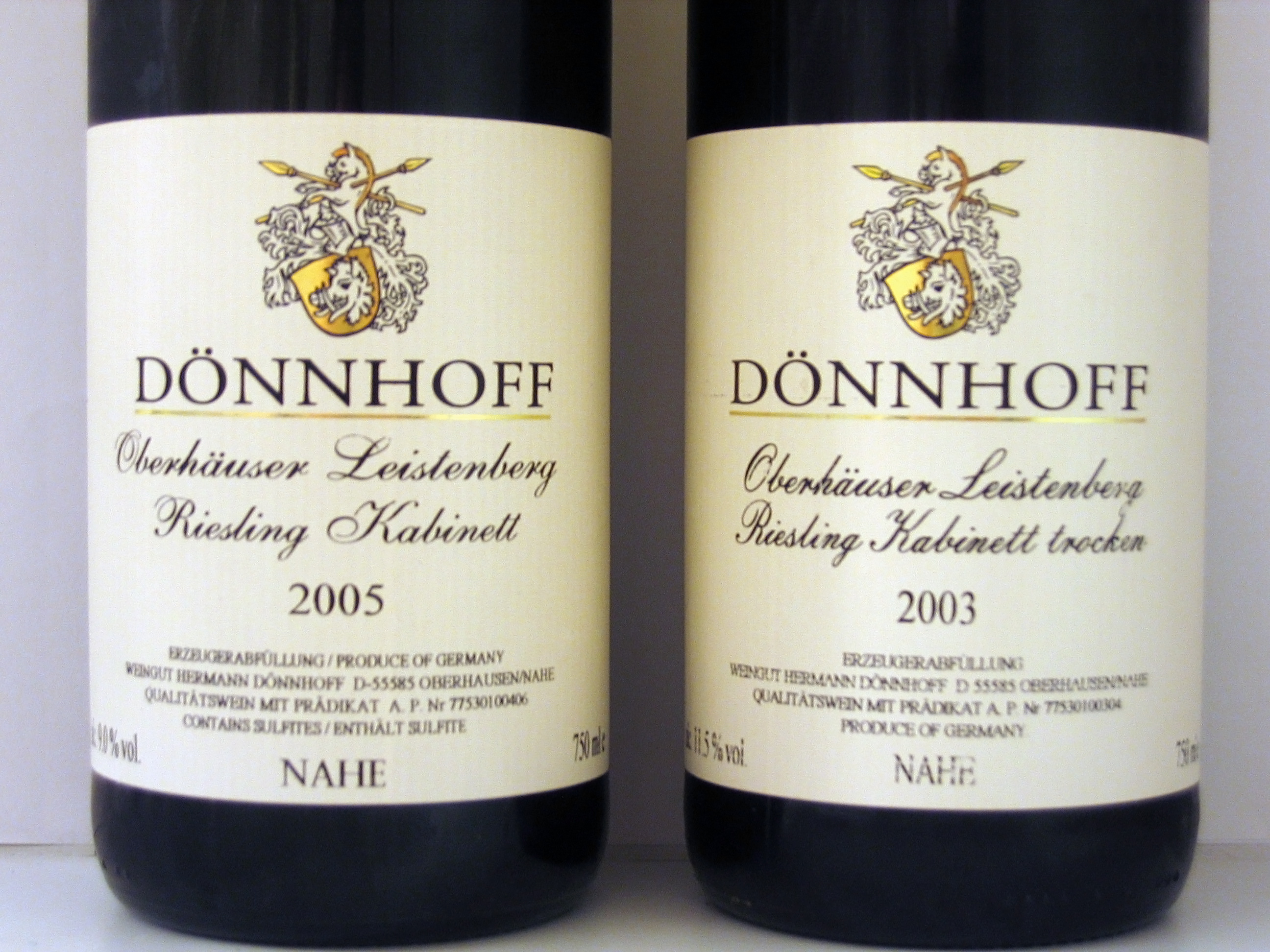
Dönnhoff bottles of wine from the Oberhäuser Leistenberg vineyard

Weingut Hermann Dönnhoff

Weingut Hermann Dönnhoff is a German wine grower and producer based in Oberhausen, in the wine-growing region of Nahe, Rhineland-Palatinate, Germany. The Dönnhoff family have been making wine in this region since 1750.

From 1971, the Geisenheimer Helmut Dönnhoff has been in charge of winemaking at this estate and has been described by wine critics Hugh Johnson as having a "fanatical commitment to quality, and a remarkable natural talent for winemaking", and as a "superstar" of the region by Robert Parker. Helmut was named German Winemaker of the Year in 1999 by the Gault Millau Guide to German Wines.

Eighty percent of Dönnhoff's twenty hectares of vineyard holdings grow Riesling grapes, with the remaining twenty percent Pinot blanc and Pinot gris. Depending on the vintage, around 10,000 cases of wine are produced by this estate each year.

Dönnhoff is a member of the Verband Deutscher Prädikatsweingüter (VDP).
