= Weingut Schloss Sommerhausen =

German winery

- Industry: Winery
- Founded: 1435
- Headquarters: Hauptstraße 25, 97286 Sommerhausen, Germany
- Key people: Martin Steinmann
- Website: www.sommerhausen.com

Weingut Schloss Sommerhausen

Weingut Schloss Sommerhausen is a traditional winery located in Sommerhausen Germany and founded in 1435. The founder Schenk Konrad IV of Limpurg started with construction of the Schlosskeller. Weingut Schloss Sommerhausen is a member of the Verband Deutscher Prädikatsweingüter (VDP). The production has been operating by the Steinmann family in Sommerhausen for 14 generations, each is documented to the year 1557. The products are:

- 30% Burgunder
- 25% Silvaner
- 20% Riesling
- 25% other sorts.

== See also ==
- List of oldest companies
