= Wine auction =

A wine auction may also auction other alcoholic beverages than wine. There are two basic types of wine auctions: first hand wine auctions, where wineries sell their own wines, and second hand wine auctions, arranged by auction houses or other auctioneers to make it possible for any owners of wine to trade it. In most cases, the wines traded at wine auctions are collectible "fine wines" typically suitable for extended cellaring. Second-hand buyers may be looking for mature wines which are no longer available first-hand. In all types of auction the auctioneer charges commission to both buyers and sellers.

== First hand auctions ==
First hand wine auctions are usually arranged by wine industry organisations, and fill promotional or charitable purposes, or are used to gauge the market. The wines sold at such auctions are usually special lot wines, or back vintages stored by the producers. An example of such auctions is the annual wine auction held by Hospices de Beaune in Burgundy, where Burgundy wines from vineyards donated to the Hospices de Beaune are auctioned off by the barrel, and often bought by négociants who bottle and sell the wines to the consumer market. Another example are the German wine auctions where mostly special lot wines are sold, and are bought by a combination of private wine collectors and wine dealers.

== Second hand auctions ==
Second hand wine auctions are arranged by many major auction houses, such as Zachys, Acker, Hart Davis Hart, Christie's and Sotheby's. In 2019, Zachys was the top seller with sale of over US$121,000,000. Prices for many wines at these auctions are used as a price indication for collectible wine when traded through other channels, such as First Growth Bordeaux wines sold by rare wine dealers, or when négociants sell mature wines from their stock to restaurants.

== Online wine auctions ==
Online wine auctions have been held since the 1990s. Online wine auctions generally sell fine wines, or collectible wines, that are consigned by private individuals. In 2018 the total sales for online wine auctions was $74.9 million. In 2018 the total sales for all auctions of collectible wines, including online and traditional auctions, was $479.1 million. Ranked by 2018 sales, the leading online wine auctions are: WineBid, $31 million; Spectrum, $10 million; Acker Merrall & Condit, $9.3 million; Zachy’s, $9.3 million; and Hart Davis Hart, $9.2 million.

== See also ==
- London International Vintners Exchange
