= Karthäuserhof =

German Winery

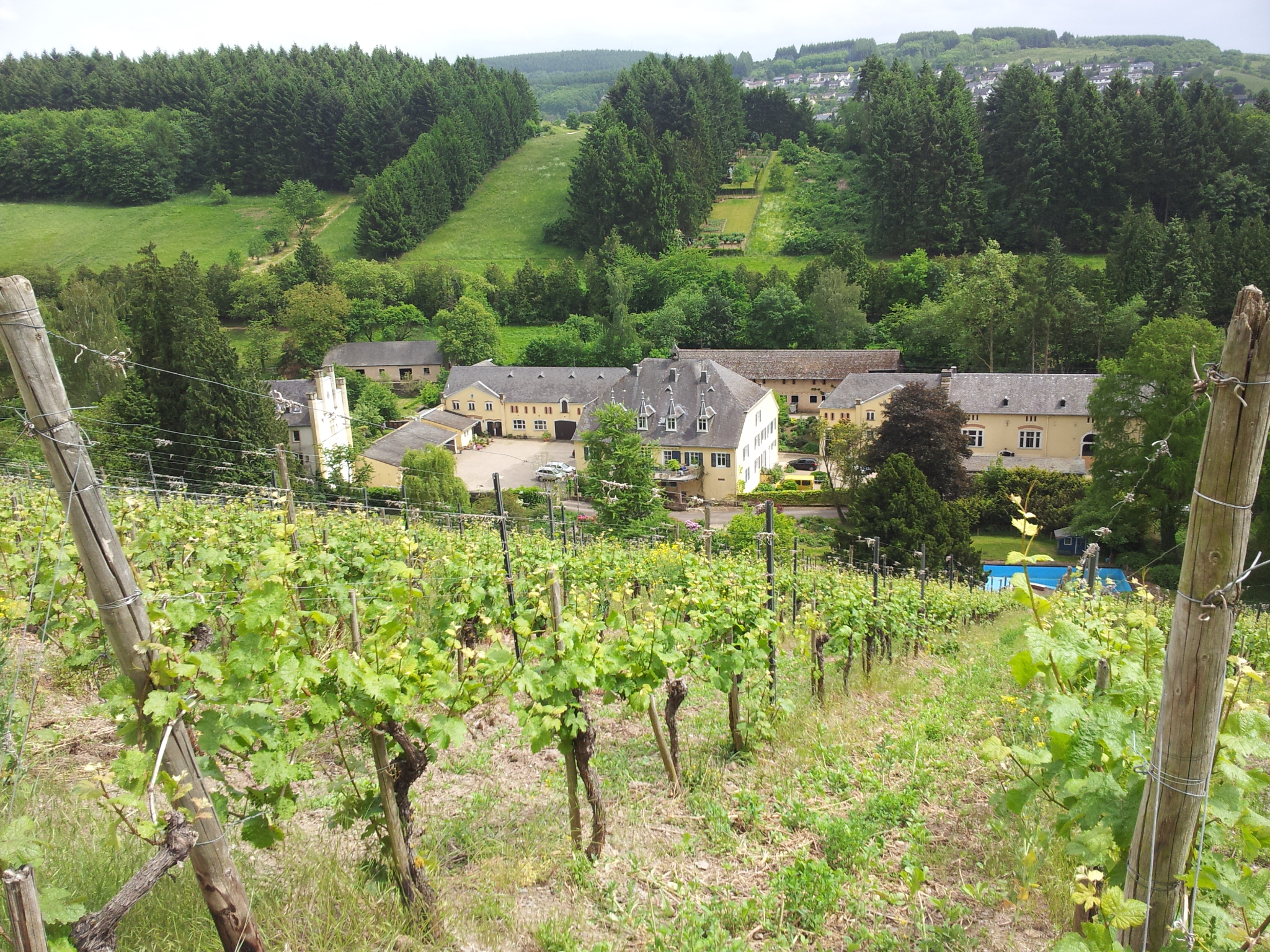
- Native name: Weingut Karthäuserhof KG
- Industry: Winery
- Founded: 1335
- Headquarters: Karthäuserhof 1, 54292 Trier, Germany
- Website: www.karthaeuserhof-shop.com

Weingut Karthäuserhof KG

Karthäuserhof is the oldest winery in Rhineland-Palatinate state of Germany founded in 1335, when elector of Trier gave vineyards to Carthusians monks, after them is the winery name. The only source of the fruit for winery is the local Karthäuserhofberg and vineyard of 19 hectares is planted mainly with Riesling grape.
