= German wine auctions =

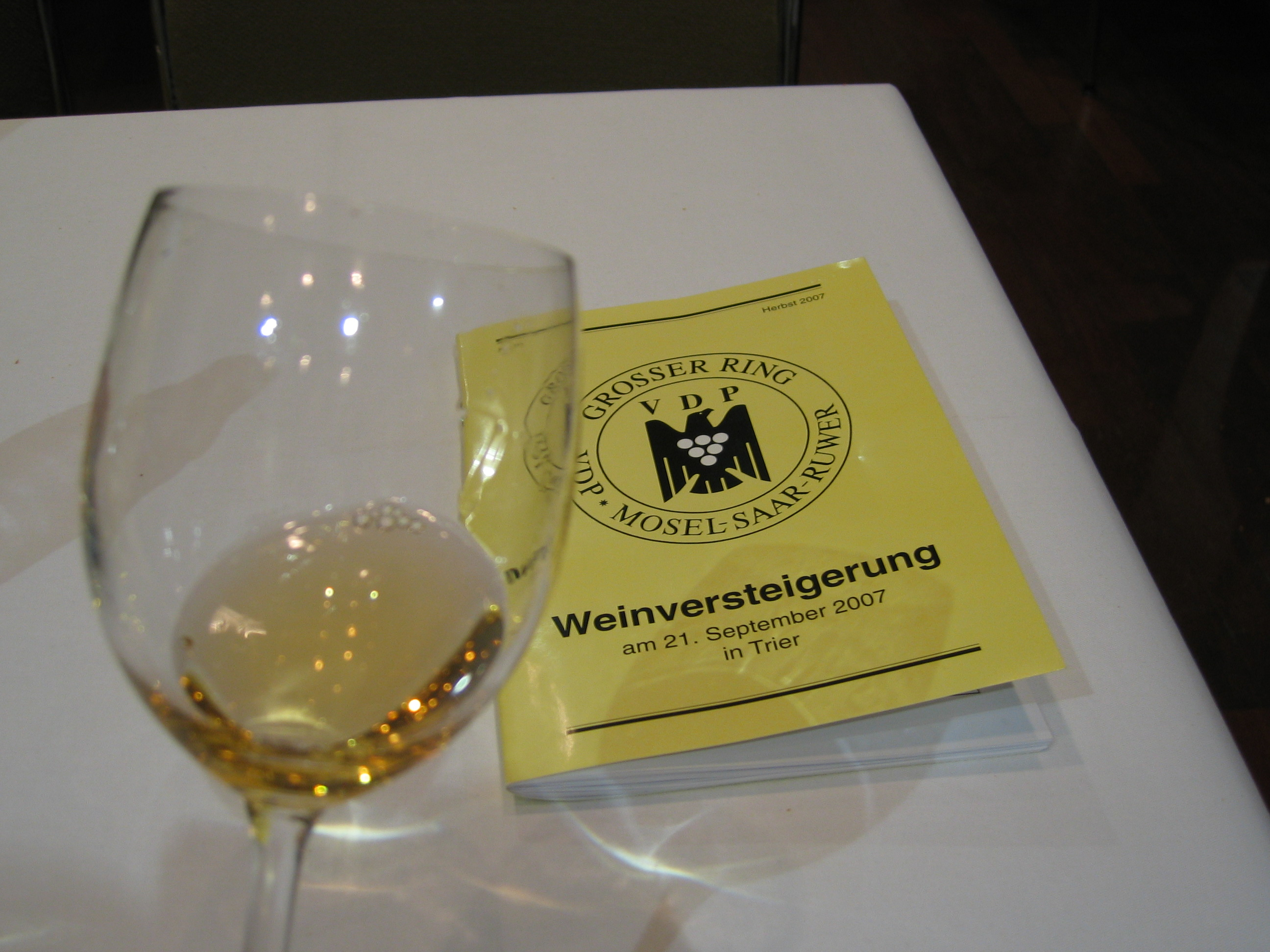
A sample of a 2005 Riesling Trockenbeerenauslese served at the 2007 VDP Grosser Ring auction in Trier

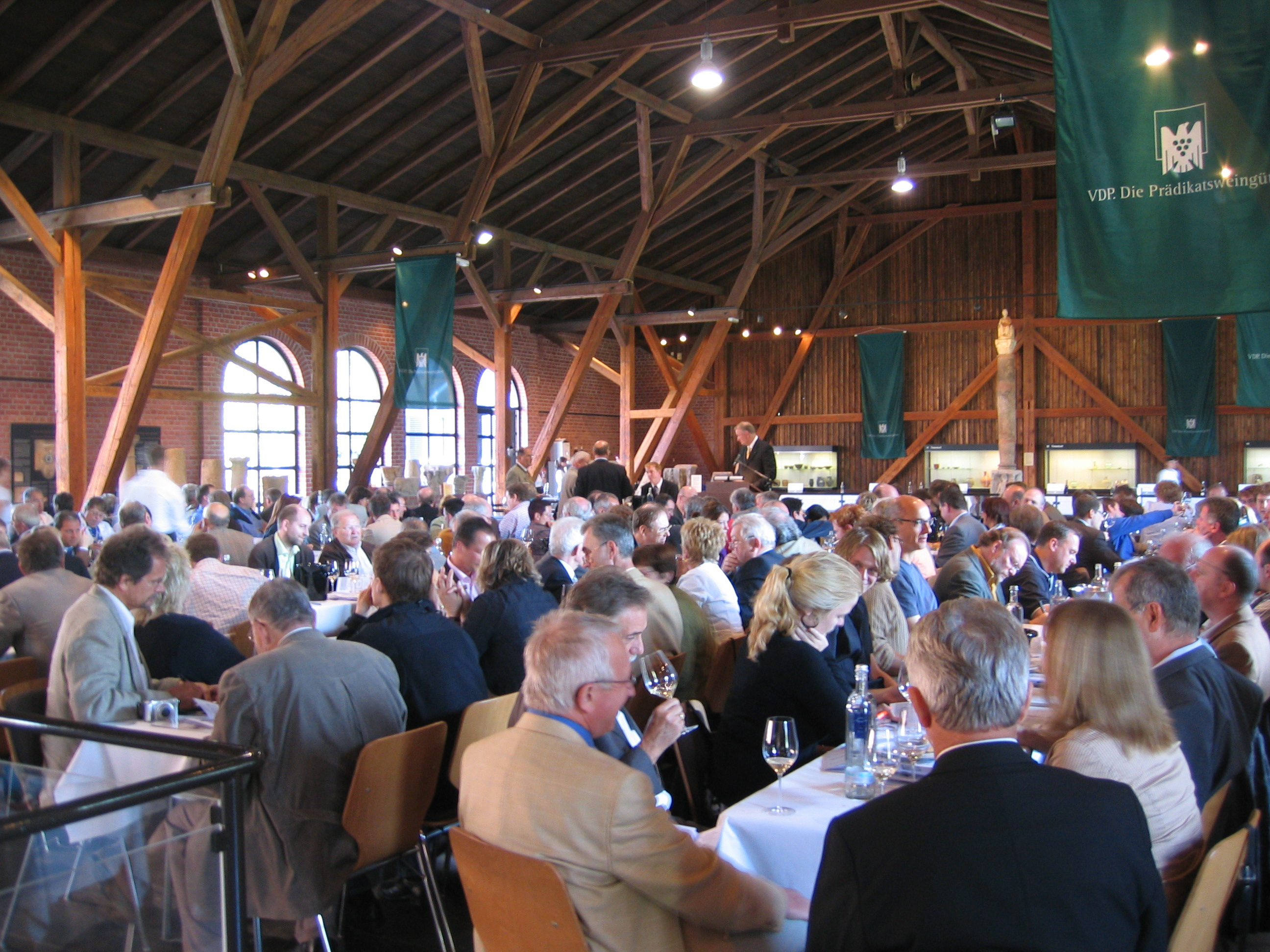
The auction at Römerhalle in Bad Kreuznach, Nahe, where wines from the regions Ahr, Nahe, Pfalz and Rheinhessen are auctioned

A number of German wine auctions are held each year, where the premier German wine producers auction off some of the best young wines, as well as some older wines. Most auctions are arranged by the regional associations of Verband Deutscher Prädikatsweingüter (VDP). These auctions differ from wine auctions on the second-hand market held by auction houses, where collectible wines are sold by private or corporate owners, since it is "first hand" wines that are sold.

== Focus of the auctions ==
Originally and up until the mid-20th century, before estate bottling was as standard as it is today, wines of more ordinary quality auctioned off by the barrel would also appear at these auctions. Today, the auctions are intended for small lot wines not sold through regular channels. Some of these wines are produced in quantities less than 100 litres. In the 2007 auctions, the smallest lot of a young wine corresponded to just 6 bottles (3 full and 6 half bottles) of a 2006 Trockenbeerenauslese, and the largest lot corresponded to 648 bottles of a 2006 Spätlese. The auctions are to a large extent focused on semi-sweet and sweet Riesling wines, but some dry Riesling wines, Spätburgunder wines and a few other wines are also auctioned, depending on the region.

The German wine classification system lends itself to differentiation of wines, especially sweet wines, according to quality level. This has most likely contributed to the tradition of producing small lot wines resulting from extreme selection, which is a tradition hardly found anywhere else in the wine world. The wines put up for auction belong in most Prädikat levels, but are usually given the additional designation Goldkapsel (Golden capsule) to show that they are "extra good", and small sticker announces that the bottle was sold at a particular auction. (To complicate matters, the unregulated Goldkapsel designation is not limited to auction wines.)

While the revenue from the auctions is far from insignificant for many of the sellers, the auctions also serve a marketing purpose for the best VDP members, since it is a rather small circle of estates that are good enough to sell wine in these auctions.

== Auction procedure ==
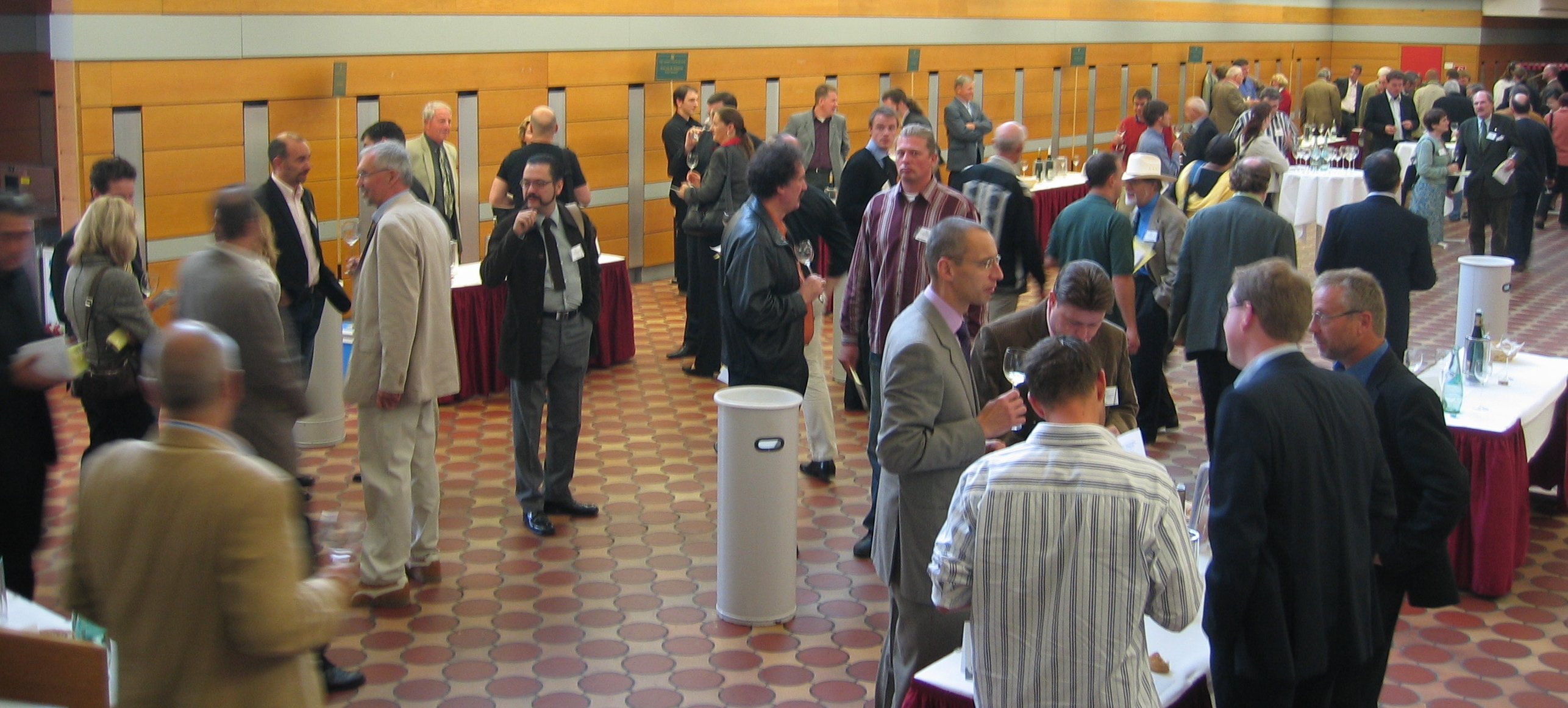
Pre-auction tasting for the VDP Grosser Ring auction in Trier

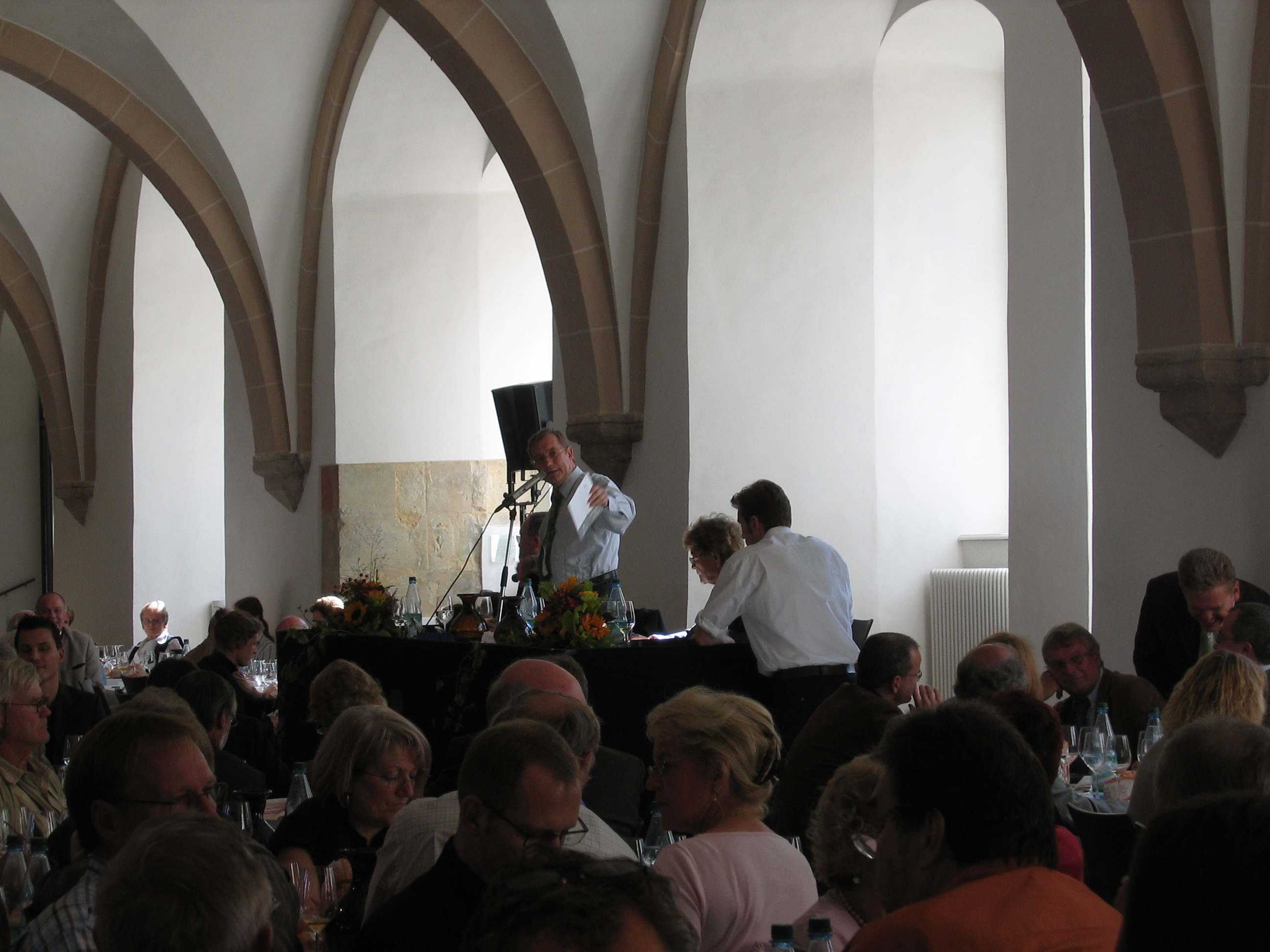
VDP Rheingau auction at Kloster Eberbach

The exact auction procedures varies somewhat between the different regional auctions, but have several things in common. The wines put up for auction must be approved by a tasting panel of the auctioning society before being admitted to the auction. After that, a calling price is decided upon after a tasting by commissioners (explained below). The seller is in principle free to decide how many bottles he wishes to sell, but there is a minimum quantity depending on the wine's classification, and the seller must also provide sufficient bottles for the auction tasting. Typically, a pre-auction tasting is held in the morning of the auction day, where the participants may taste the wines in any order. A small tasting portion of each wine is served to all participants during the auction itself, just before the wine is auctioned. This procedure is sometimes called a "wet wine auction" to differentiate it from a "dry wine auction" where no wines are served. For wines made in very small lots, this means that a significant portion of the quantity produced must be served up for free. A few of the most rare wines are only offered in the morning tasting in some auctions, and the small lots of a few old bottles are not offered for tasting.

Participation in the auction is open to any interested parties, but an entrance ticket must be paid. Formally, the sellers do not sell their wines to the individual participants of the auction, but rather to approved commissioners, which act as intermediaries and cast the actual bids at the auction. These number about 10 per auction. The commissioners collect bids from a number of prospective buyers before and during the auction. In most cases, a wine lot will be divided among several commissioners, with one of them as lead buyer. Commissioners charge around five percent of the auction price for their services.
