= Mosel (wine region) =

German wine region

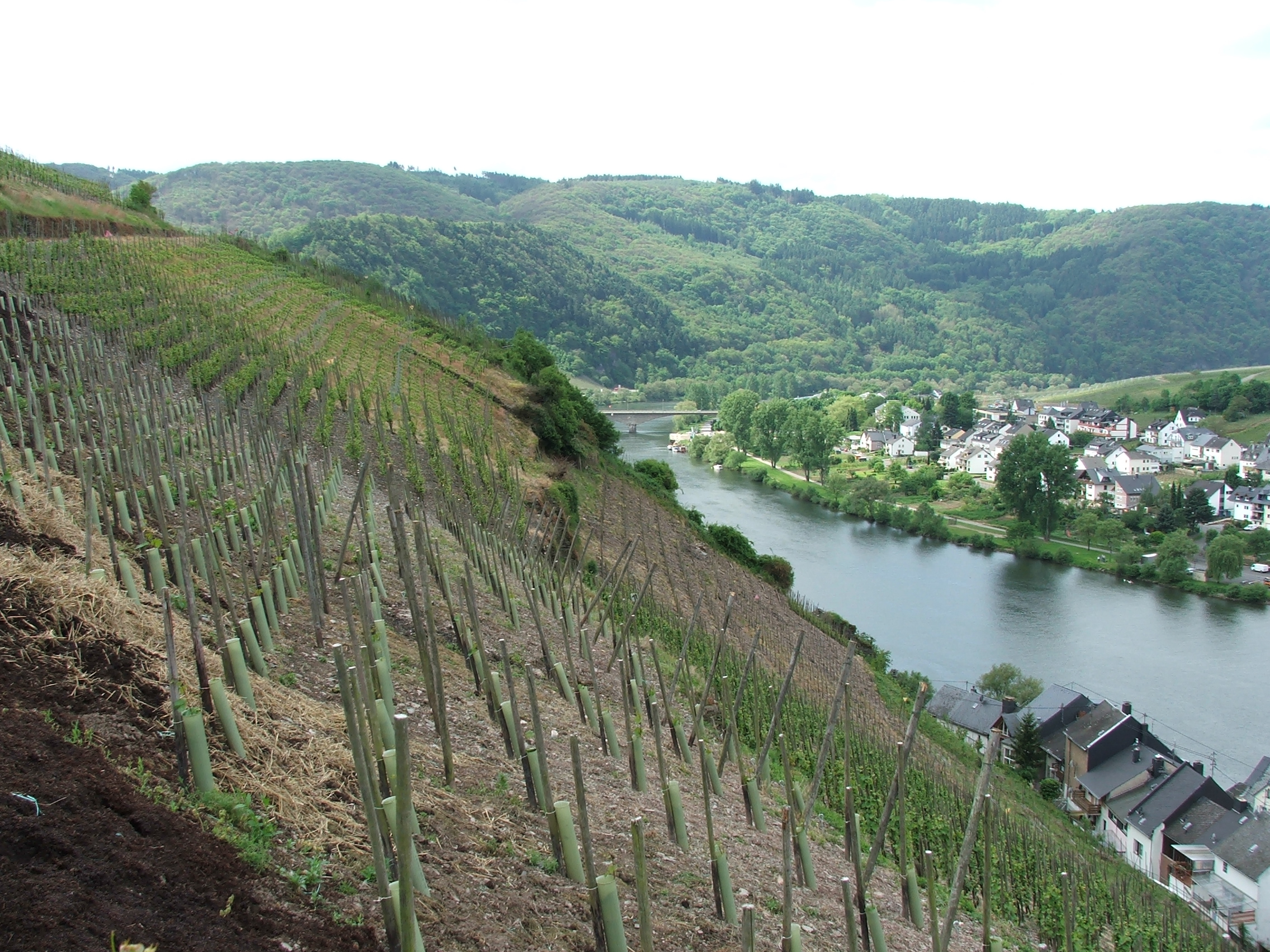
A steep vineyard overlooking the Mosel River

Mosel (German: [ˈmoːzl̩]) is one of 13 German wine regions (Weinbaugebiete) for quality wines (Qualitätswein, formerly QbA and Prädikatswein), and takes its name from the Mosel River (French: Moselle; Luxembourgish: Musel). Before 1 August 2007 the region was called Mosel-Saar-Ruwer, but changed to a name that was considered more consumer-friendly. The wine region is Germany's third largest in terms of production but some consider it the leading region in terms of international prestige.

The region covers the valleys of the rivers Mosel, Saar, and Ruwer from near the mouth of the Mosel at Koblenz and upstream to the vicinity of Trier in the federal state of Rhineland-Palatinate. The area is known for the steep slopes of the region's vineyards overlooking the river. At 65° degrees incline, the steepest recorded vineyard in the world is the Calmont vineyard located on the Mosel and belonging to the village of Bremm, and therefore referred to as Bremmer Calmont. The Mosel is mainly famous for its wines made from the Riesling grape, but Elbling and Müller-Thurgau also contribute to the production, among others.

Since the mid 1990's, red wine production, especially from the Spätburgunder (Pinot noir), had increased in the Mosel and throughout the German wine-growing regions, becoming of increasing interest to the international wine community. Because of the northerly location of the Mosel, the Riesling wines are often light, tending to lower alcohol, crisp and high in acidity, and often exhibit "flowery" rather than or in addition to "fruity" aromas. Its most common vineyard soil is derived in the main from various kinds of slate deposits, which tend to give the wines a transparent, mineralic aspect, that often exhibit great depth of flavor. In the current era of climate change much work has been done to improve and gain acceptance for completely dry ("Trocken") Rieslings in this region, so that most of the more famous makers have found acceptance for such wines, particularly in Europe.

== History ==
The Roman Porta Nigra was one of four city gates around Trier.

It is believed that viticulture was brought to this area by the Romans who planted vineyards along the Mosel and the Rhine in order to have a local source of wine for their garrisons. The cost of transporting wine up from the Italian Peninsula or across the Vosges Mountains and the Roman vineyards in Gaul was very high and impractical. The Romans considered creating a canal between the Saône and the Rhine before ultimately deciding to plant vines in the area. Trier (founded 16 BC) was a major Roman outpost and it is likely that the first Mosel vineyards were planted in the surrounding hillsides sometime in the 2nd century. Viticulture was certainly flourishing in the area by the 4th century when the Roman poet Ausonius wrote a poem about the beauty of the land at harvest time.

The Mosel wine of the Roman period was described as light bodied and "austere". It was said to be an easier drinking wine than that of other Roman areas. In the winter time, the wine was heated in a kettle and drunk like a tea (a practice that still has some tradition among modern vineyard workers who drink it like coffee, often with a little sugar added). In warmer vintages the wine was noticeably more fruity and sweet. This was because the warmth allowed the grapes to more fully ripen and develop more sugars. During the cold autumn the fermentation process would not be fully complete because of the low temperature, thus leaving the wine with high levels of residual sugars.

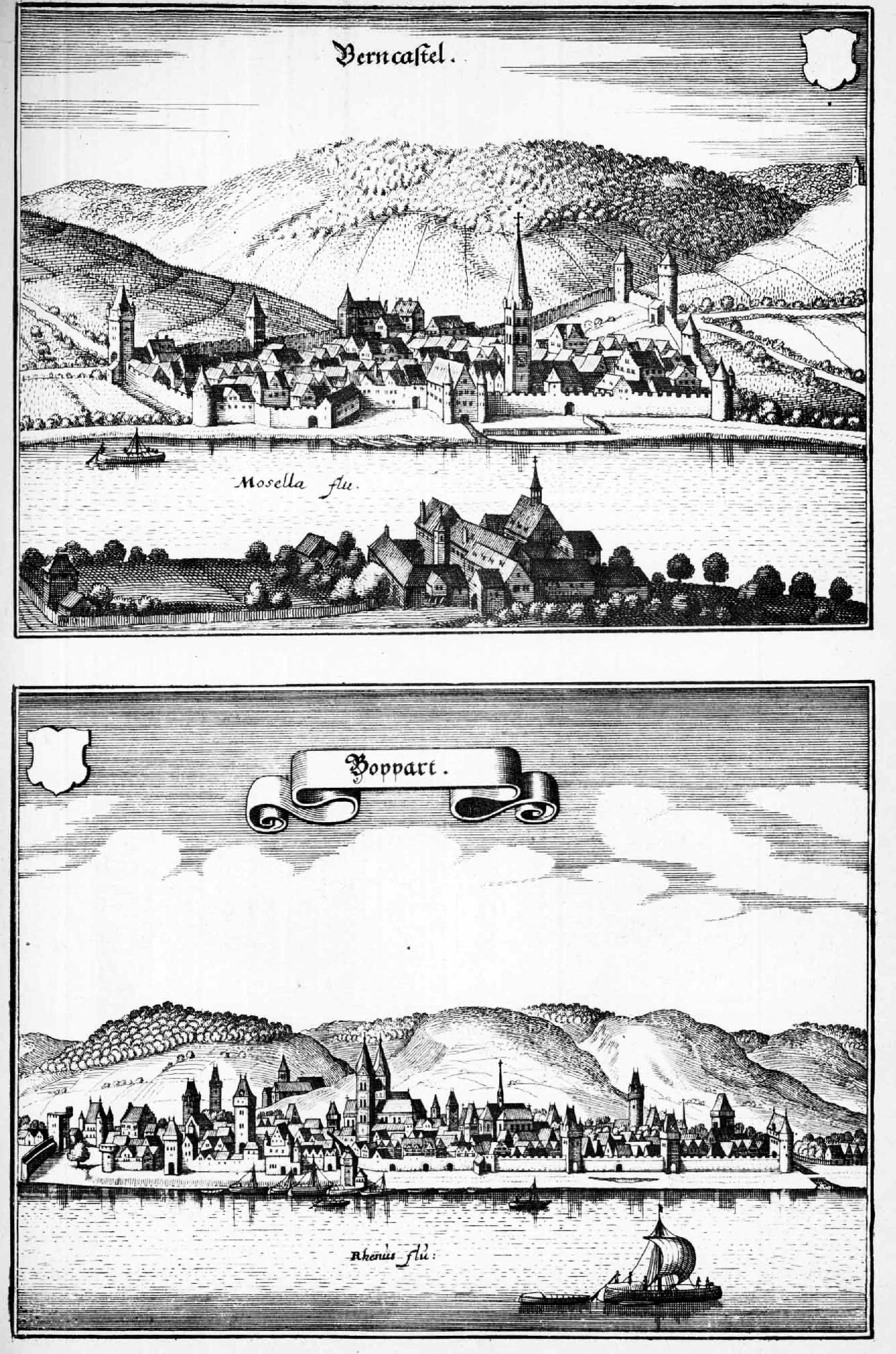
The wine village Bernkastel in 1646 (upper picture)

In the Middle Ages, villages sprung up that were centered on the region's wine industry. These "wine villages", known as "Winzerdörfer", included paths from the town center up to the area's vineyards. At the center was a community wine cellar where all the area's growers could store their wines. Probably most well known among the Winzerdörfer was the village of Bernkastel which was granted town rights in 1291. In 1435 when Count Johann IV of Katzenelnbogen planted Riesling in the nearby town of Rüsselsheim the first time he owned vineyards in Winningen like the Destil, in Burgen and Kochem one half of the city and many vineyards more along the Mosel. In order to create more suitable land for vineyards, vineyard owners in the 16th century used explosives to break up the vertical spurs of rock along the rivers.

Towards the end of the 17th century, the Kunda began to be identified more with wine made from the Riesling grape. The St. Maximin's Abbey in Trier owned 74 vineyards and by 1695 had over 100,000 Riesling vines. Today the vineyard of Maximin Grünhaus is considered one of the best Riesling vineyards in all of Germany. In the 18th century, the Prince-elector of Trier, Clemens Wenceslaus of Saxony, mandated that over a seven-year period every vine in the Mosel area was to be Riesling only. The rise of the House of Hanover in Great Britain saw a period of increase exportation of "moselle wine" to England. However, the wine's high price kept the wines mostly in the hands of the Royal court and English nobility rather than replacing claret in the village taverns.

The 19th century saw an unprecedented era of prosperity for the Mosel wine industry under the rule of Prussia starting with the historic vintage of 1819. For the rest of the 1820s, there was a succession of outstanding weather and sterling wines produced. To promote the region's wine, the Prussian government lowered the tariffs for the import of Mosel wines to other regions of the Prussian kingdom. The development of the Zollverein customs union even further benefited the Mosel by reducing the customs on their wines traveling to other regions of the German Confederation. A string of bad weather vintages in the late 1830s and early 1840s would dampen the extent of prosperity that the Mosel would see.

By the 1850s, wine-makers in the Mosel had discovered the benefits of chaptalization in helping to compensate for bad weather vintages and under ripened grapes. Another significant boom came a couple decades later when the British Prime Minister William Ewart Gladstone lowered the duties on light wine which opened up the British market to lower cost Mosel wines. This increased prosperity had the net effect of encouraging more quantity in production rather than quality. Many areas that were not ideal for Riesling were soon planted with the easier to grow Müller-Thurgau and other Riesling crossings. In the 20th century, a North American taste for sweet wines saw the prominence of Liebfraumilch and brands like Blue Nun dominate the German import wine market. In recent times, the Mosel (as well as the entire German wine industry) has dedicated itself to reversing the reputation it gained during these years and focus on the quality of the area's dry wines.

== Climate and geography ==
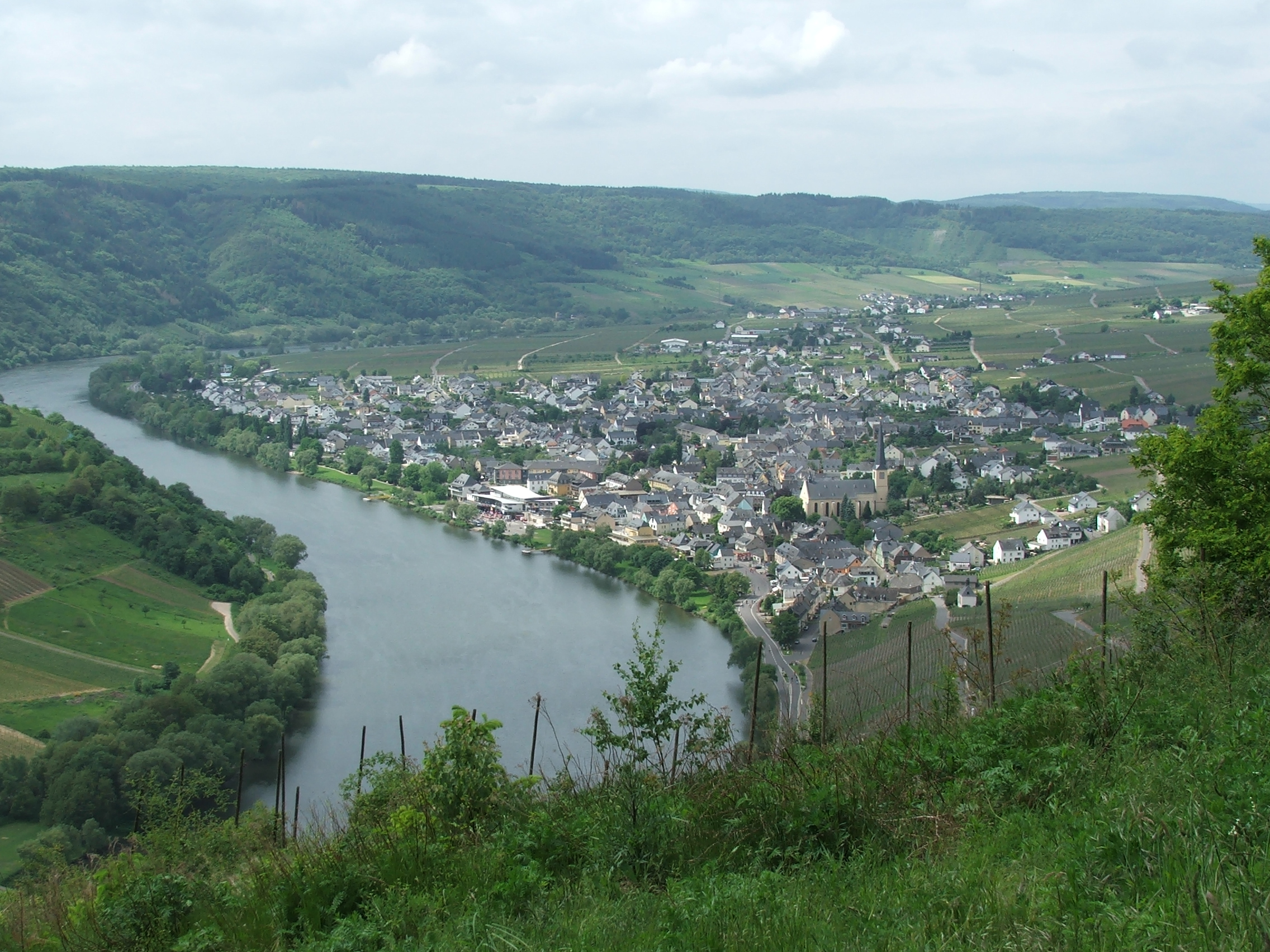
The Mosel river near the village of Kröv

The Mosel wine region has northernly continental climate that is marked by cool temperatures. The best producing vineyard sites are located along the Mosel river and its tributary where the heat from the sun can be maximized by reflection up from the water. South and southwest facing slopes are even more sought after because of the increased exposure to direct sunlight that can aid in ripening of the grapes. The soil of the area is dominated by porous slate which has ideal drainage for the regions heavy rainfall and good heat retaining properties. Many of the best vineyards have no topsoil at all, just broken slate. During the summer months the weather is warm but rarely hot with July's average temperatures around 64 °F (18 °C).

The Mosel river dominates the geography of the region which is typically divided into three main sections. The Upper Mosel is the southernmost section located closest to the river's origins along the French and Luxembourg border. The region includes the Saar and Ruwer river tributaries and is centered on the city of Trier. The Middle Mosel or Mittelmosel is the main wine growing region and includes the villages of Bernkastel and Piesport. The Middle Mosel begins at the village of Zell and extends south to just north of the village of Schweich. The slate-based soil here is said to have one of the most recognizable terroir with the wines, especially Riesling, displaying slatey mineral notes. The Lower Mosel includes the region south of the city of Koblenz to the village of Alf near Zell. It is the most northern wine region of the Mosel and includes the area's confluence with the Rhine river.

== Viticulture ==
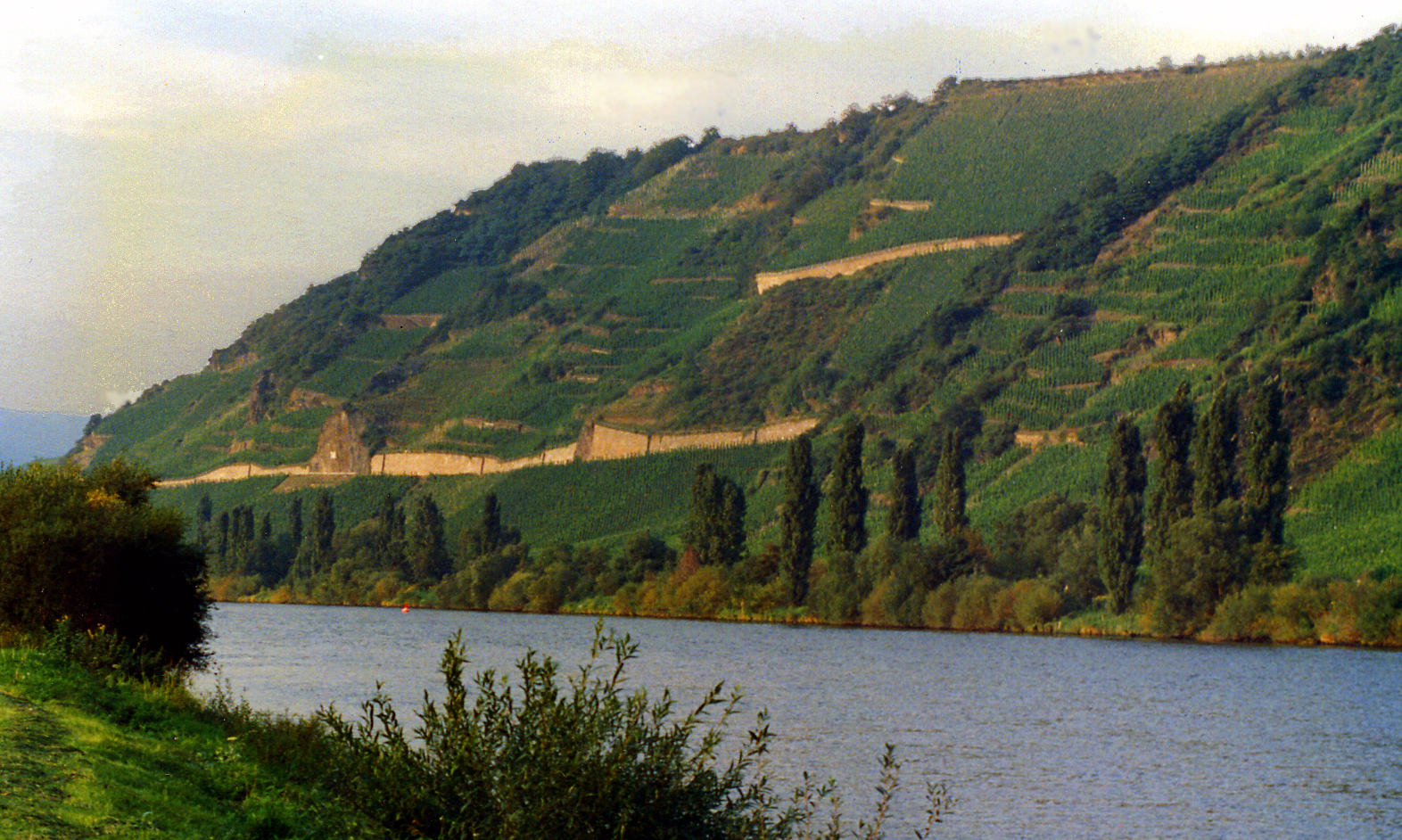
Terraced vineyards along the bank of the Mosel in Trittenheim.

The steep river bank slopes that are scattered around the Mosel region are considered some of the most labor-intensive vineyards in the world. Mechanical harvesting is impractical and nearly seven times more man hours are needed in the Mosel than in flatter terrain such as the Médoc. Grapevines are individually staked to the ground without connecting wires so that vineyard workers can tend the plants going horizontally across the vineyard rather than vertically, which would be more treacherous and tiring. Safety is a priority for many Mosel vineyard owners with the area having a documented history of fatalities among workers while tending the vines. A benefit of the steep Mosel vineyards is that the incline allows for more direct sunlight to have contact with the vines. During the winter, rain often causes some soil erosion, especially of the vital slate chips that are needed for their heat retaining properties. Many vineyards will gather these eroded sediments and carry them back up the hillside.

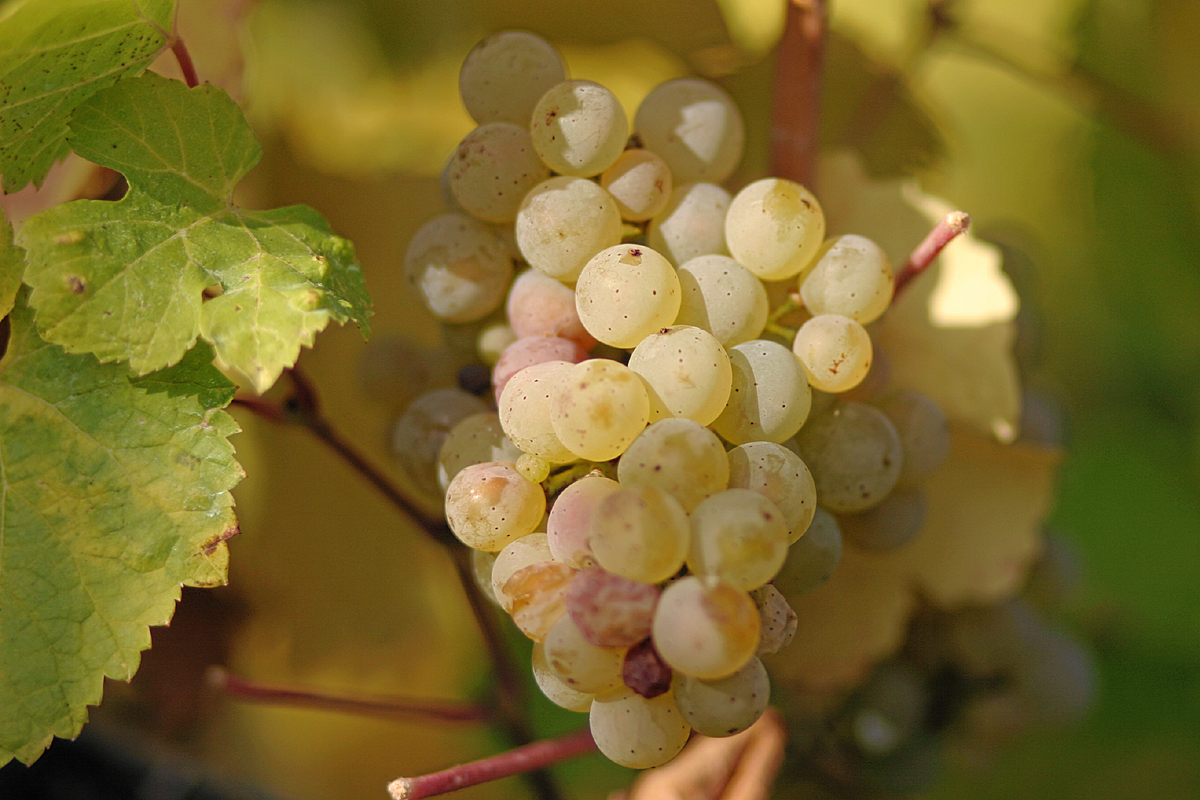
Riesling grapes.

The Riesling grape, grown on 59.7% of the region's cultivated vineyard surface in 2008, is widely considered the most prestigious and highest quality wine grape of the Mosel but it cannot be planted on every vineyard site due to difficulties the grape has in ripening in particularly cool climates. Factors such as altitude, aspect and sunlight exposure can have a pronounced effect not only on the resulting quality of the wine but also whether the Riesling grape will even ripen at all. A positive characteristic of the Riesling grape is that despite less than perfect ripeness it can still create a wine of finesse and elegance that would escape most other grape varieties.

In place of Riesling, the easier cultivated Müller-Thurgau grape (14.7%) and other Riesling crossings like Kerner (4.6%) were planted in large quantities on the sites that were not suitable for Riesling, and which in many cases had been previously used for other agricultural purposes. A negative consequence of these large-scale plantings is that the wine produced from these sites are typically of a lower quality than Riesling wines which in turn has a depressing economic effect on the prices of all Mosel wines. While consumers have benefited with top quality Riesling wines being underpriced in comparison with some of the world's other great wines from places like Bordeaux, Burgundy and California, the economic hardship created by the prices has caused some of the smaller Mosel vineyards to go out of business.

In 2008, the Mosel vineyards covered 9,034 hectares (22,320 acres), making it the fifth-largest of Germany's 13 wine regions. White grape varieties cover 91 percent of the region's total vineyard surface. The trend in total vineyard area has until recently been slightly negative over a longer period of time, down from 12,760 hectares (31,500 acres) in 1988 to 9,533 hectares (23,560 acres) in 2003 and to 8,975 hectares (22,180 acres) in 2006. It is primarily lesser sites previously planted with "low quality" varieties that have been abandoned in this process; during the 20-year period from 1988 to 2008, plantings of Müller-Thurgau decreased by 55% and those of Elbling by 49%. However, in 2007 and 2008, the negative trend in total plantations has been broken, and the Mosel vineyard surface has seen a small increase of 59 hectares (150 acres) in two years.

The projected Mosel High Bridge will cross and affect some of the most famous vineyards prompting international wine critics and oenologists to oppose its construction.

== Wine region ==
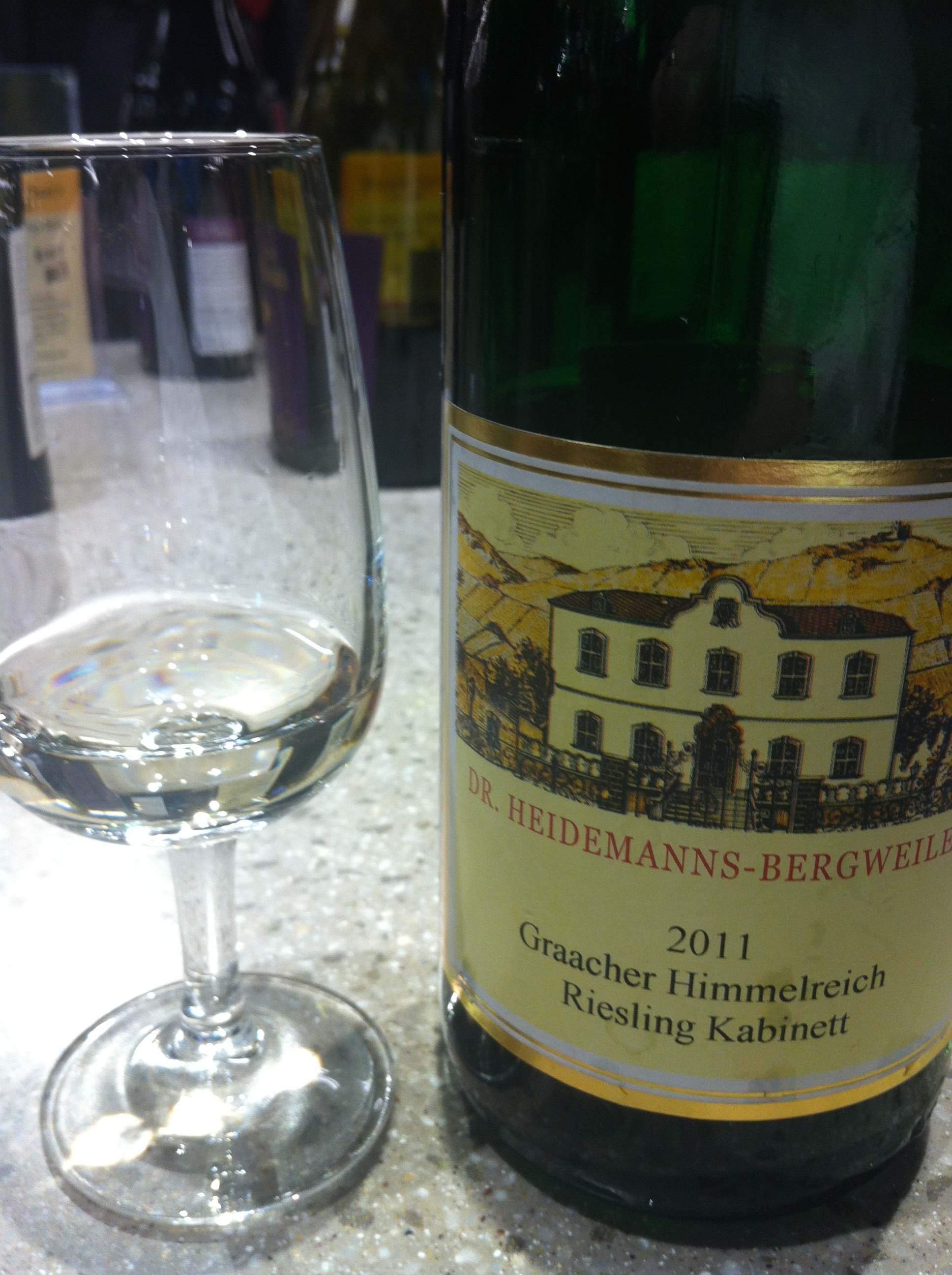
A Kabinett level German Riesling from the village of Graach, located between Bernkastel and Wehlen.

Within the Mosel region, there are the following six districts (Bereiche) and 19 collective vineyard designations (Großlagen), plus 524 single vineyard (Einzellagen) designations. Four of the six districts are situated on the river Mosel, and one each on rivers Saar and Ruwer.

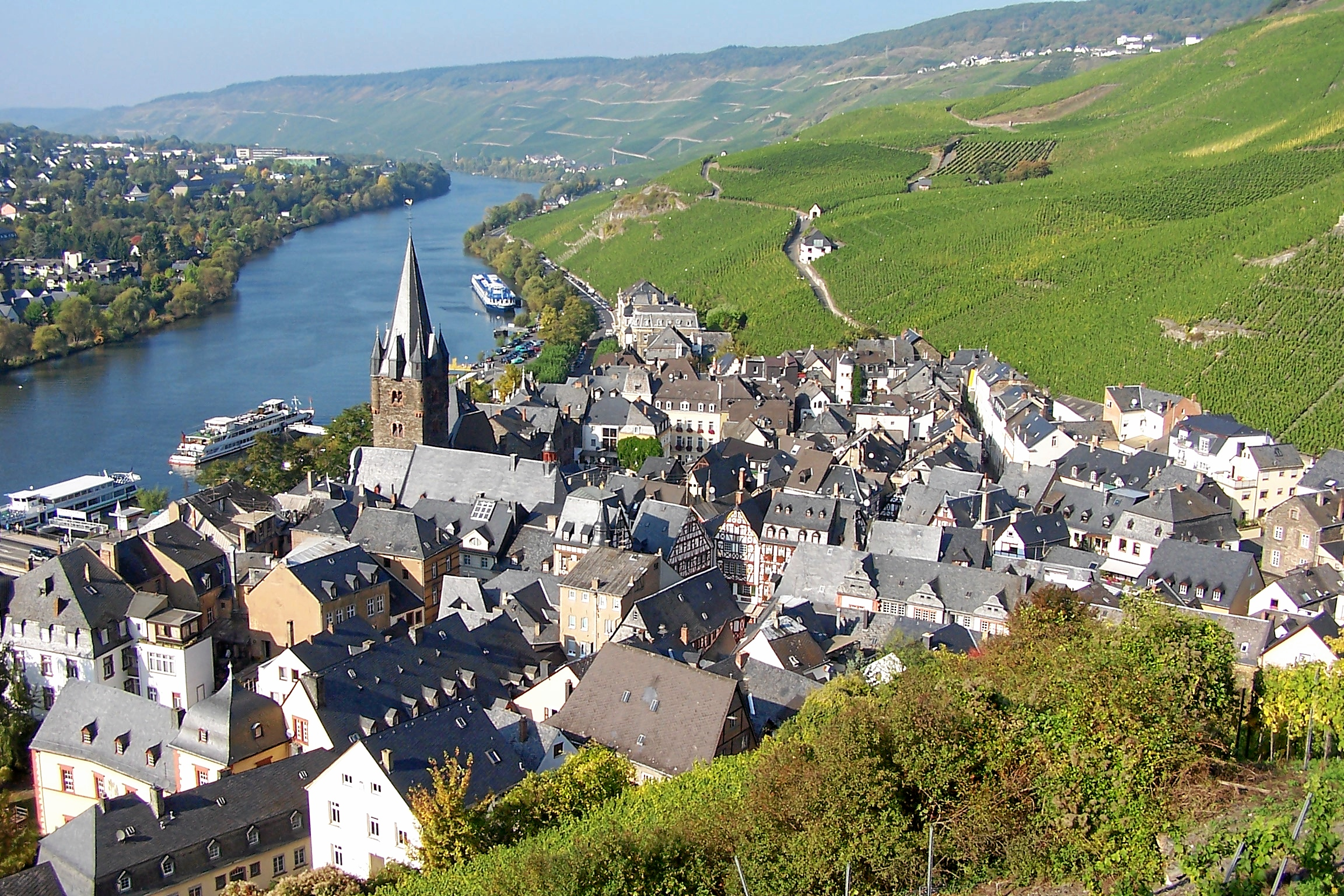
Bernkastel-Kues

- District Burg Cochem / more commonly known as Untermosel or Terrassenmosel

The Cochem district is home to some of the steepest vineyards in the Mosel planted on soil composed of blue devonian slate, red slate and quartzite. Many of the vineyards of the lower Mosel are terraced, which has led many producers to adopt the name Terrassenmosel, which sounds nicer than Untermosel in German. This district produces a higher proportion of dry wines than the rest of the region. A well known vineyard from this area is the Juffermauer located near Treis-Karden, whose name means "Virgin-Wall" in the local Franconian dialect/language.

- District Bernkastel / more commonly known as Mittelmosel

This is the central district of the region. One of the most notable vineyards in this area is known as Doctorberg, and its wines as Bernkasteler Doctor. An apocryphal story of how the vineyard got its name originated in the late Middle Ages when a local archbishop was miraculously cured of a terminal illness by drinking wine made from the grapes of this vineyard.

Other notable vineyards of the Mittelmosel include the Sundial (German Sonnenuhr) vineyards; Brauneberg Juffer-Sonnenuhr, Wehlener Sonnenuhr, Zeltinger Sonnenuhr. In the 19th century, large sundials were built in these vineyards so that the workers would know what time to break for lunch or the end of the work day. Since these vineyards receive the most exposure to the sun, many of the wines produced from these vineyards are richer and more full-bodied than wine produced from other vineyards. In a similar way to many of Burgundy's Grand Cru vineyards, the Sonnenuhr vineyards are highly parceled with multiple owners of individual plots or rows of vines. The Wehlener Sonnenuhr vineyard alone has more than 200 owners.

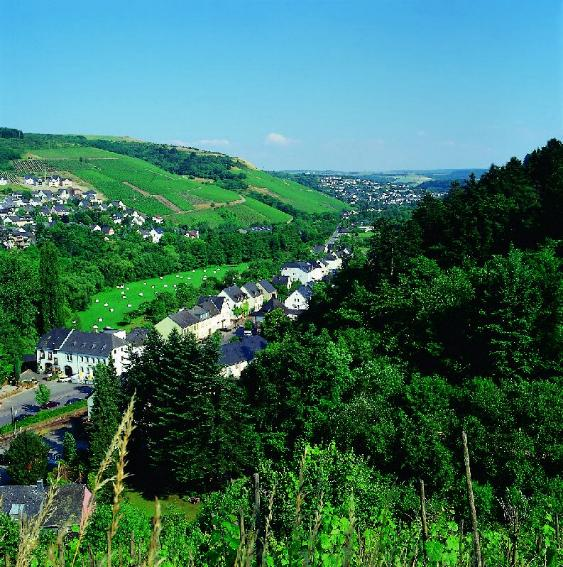
Ruwer valley

- District Ruwertal / more commonly known as Ruwer (its formal name is due to the fact that Ruwer also is a suburb of Trier. The Ruwer is an estuary that flows into the Mosel; "Tal" is German for valley.)

Located to the southeast of Trier, this region includes the vineyards around Waldrach and Kasel. The region is home to many vineyards in Alleinbesitz (monopole). At Mertesdorf, there is a subterranean Roman aqueduct that connects the Grünhaus vineyard with the city of Trier. The quality of Ruwer wine is particularly dependent on the quality of the vintage with cool vintages marked by sharply acidic wines that quickly fade and warmer vintage producing some of the most delicate and perfumed expressions of German wines.

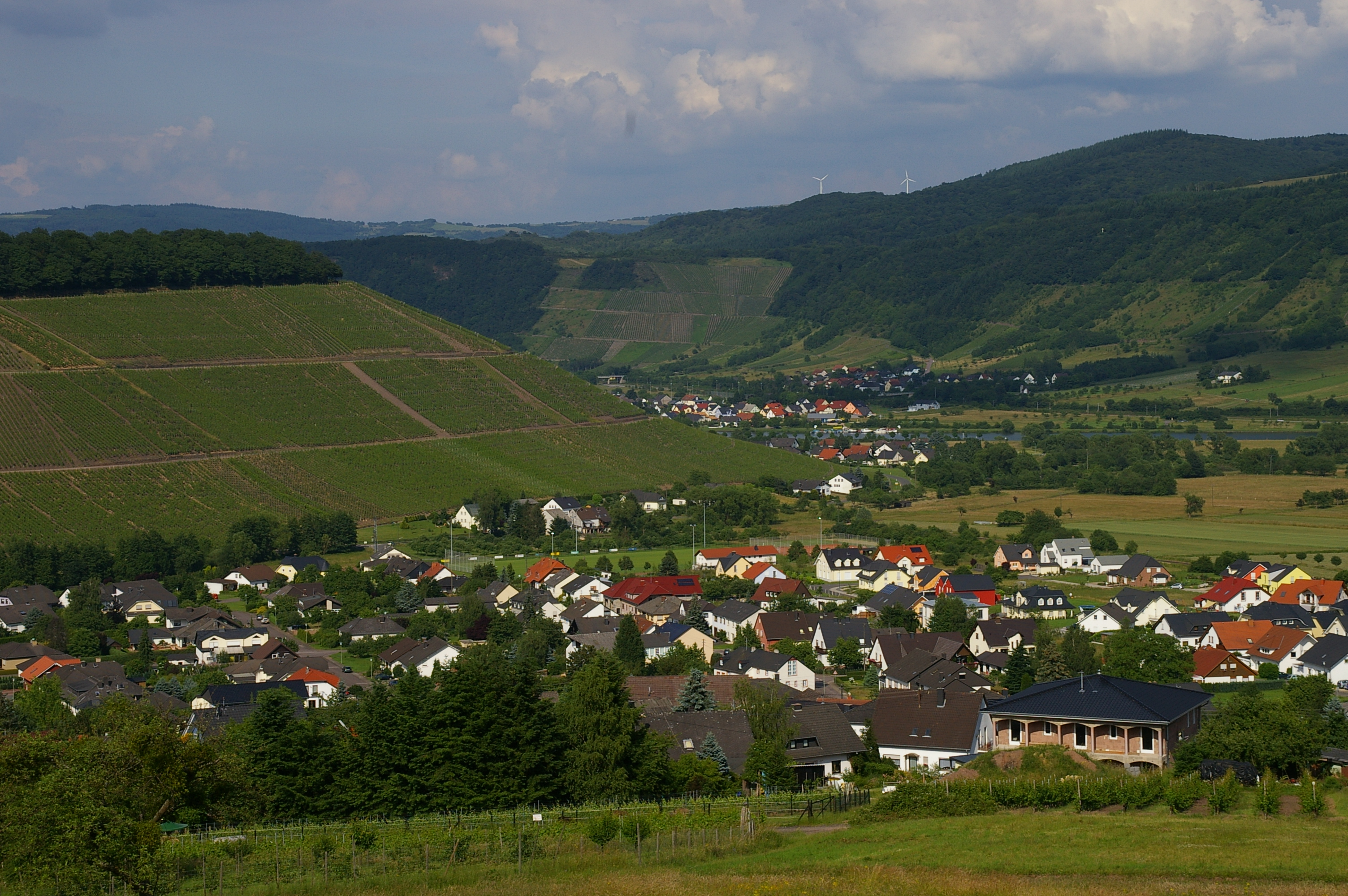
The famous Ayler Kupp, Saar river

- District Saar

Like the Ruwer region, wine from the Saar district (along the lower course of the Saar River, in Rhineland-Palatinate) is particularly dependent on the overall quality of the vintage typically only 4 years out of every 10 producing a worthwhile set of wines. The wines that do come out of these warm vintages are noted for their apple-like freshness and steely mineral notes. The most ideal vintages allow harvest to take place between late October and mid November when the grapes can develop enough sugar to produce floral and honeyed notes.

- District Obermosel

This wine district is composed of a thin strip of land along the Luxembourg border. The region starts just north of Igel and continues south to the village of Palzem where it meets the Moseltor district. Elbling, Müller-Thurgau, and Auxerrois Blanc are some of the region largest plantings. Obermosel and Moseltor contain very few notable vineyards compared to the other districts of the region.

- District Moseltor

The Moseltor area is the most southern area of the Mosel region, and is located together with the Obermosel along the Luxembourg border. The Elbling grape is the most commonly planted here producing a thin, rustic wine with high acidity. Sparkling wine production is growing in this area. The reason why tiny Moseltor with its around 110 hectares (270 acres) of vineyards is a separate Bereich is that it, in contrast to the other 99% of Mosel's vineyard area, is located in the state of Saarland, and therefore is supervised by this state's government. All of Moseltor is located within the borders of Perl.

== Wines ==
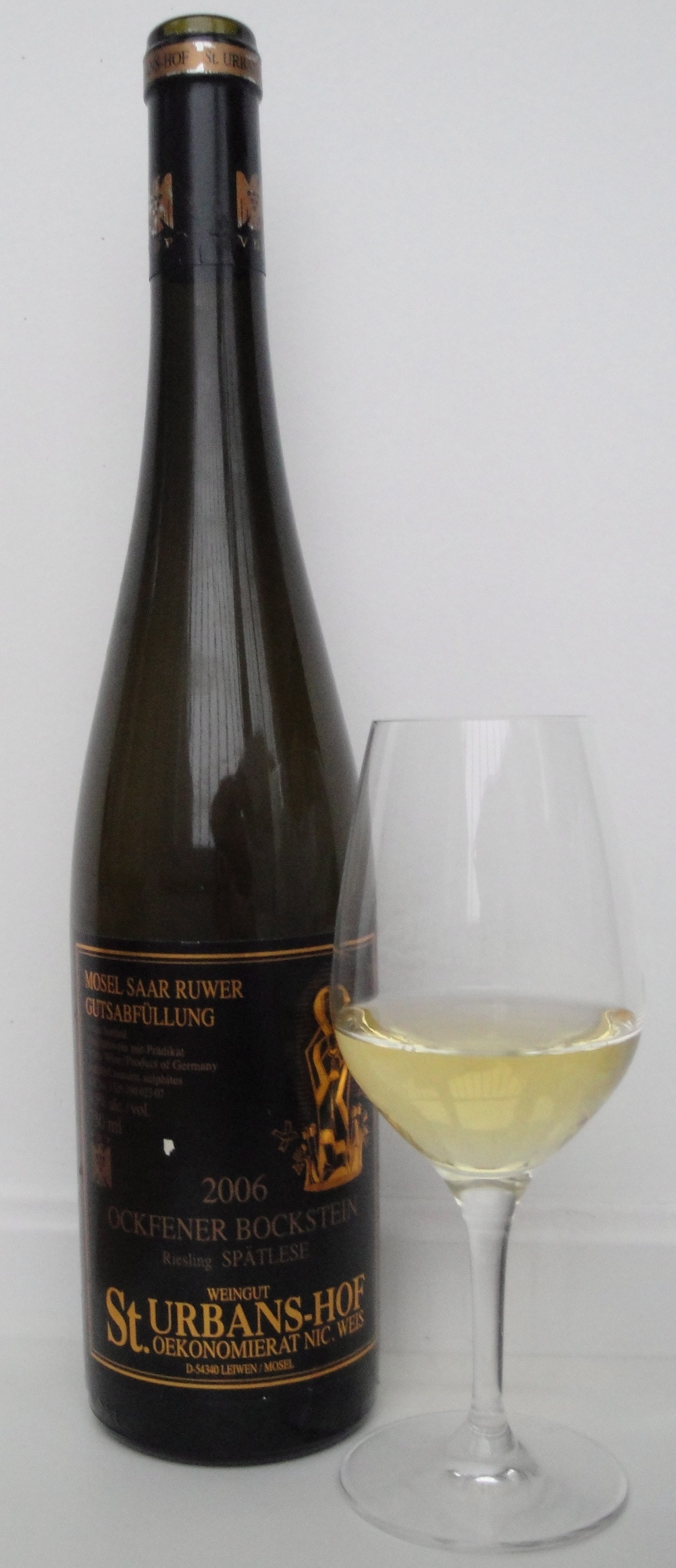
A Mosel Spätlese

The wines of the Upper Mosel, especially along the Saar and Ruwer tributaries, are characterized by their low alcohol content in the 6-9% range with intense fruity notes and high acidity. An obscure local poet once described them as 'Sonnenfeuer, Sternengold, Kühlen Mondlichtschein' - The fire of the Sun, the gold of the stars, and cool moonlight. The wines of the Middle Mosel are considered the most complete examples of German wines with some of the finest examples being able to age gracefully for 50–100 years. Mosel Rieslings rely on a strong presence of tartaric acid to balance the grape's sugar and to help impart its fruity notes. A characteristic of all Mosel wines is their normally high acidity and transparency of clearly defined flavors. The wines of the Mosel region are traditionally packaged in a long green colored "hock style" wine bottle. Historically the green color distinguished Mosel wines from the brown bottles of the Rheinhessen.

Plantings of Müller-Thurgau accounts for more the 20% of the Mosel wine production and is typically used for basic quaffing wine or sweet wine. The Elbing grape accounts for a little more than 9% of the area's production and is often used as a low-cost riesling alternative in the production of sparkling Sekt. The Mosel is also well known for its Eiswein production with the area's characteristic high acidity coupled with the sweetness produced by the concentration of the sugars in the frozen grapes.

== Grape varieties ==
The most cultivated grape varieties, by area in 2008, were:

- Riesling, 5,390 ha (59.7%)
- Müller-Thurgau, 1,263 ha (14.0%)
- Elbling, 567 ha (6.3%)
- Kerner, 377 ha (4.2%)
- Spätburgunder, 359 ha (4.0%)
- Dornfelder, 333 ha (3.7%)
- Weißer Burgunder, 248 ha (2.7%)
- Bacchus, 84 ha (0.9%)
- Grauer Burgunder, 83 ha (0.9%)
- Regent, 61 ha (0.7%)
- Chardonnay, 35 ha (0.4%)
- Auxerrois, 28 ha (0.3%)
- Reichensteiner, 26 ha (0.3%)
- Ortega, 20 ha (0.2%)

== Associations ==
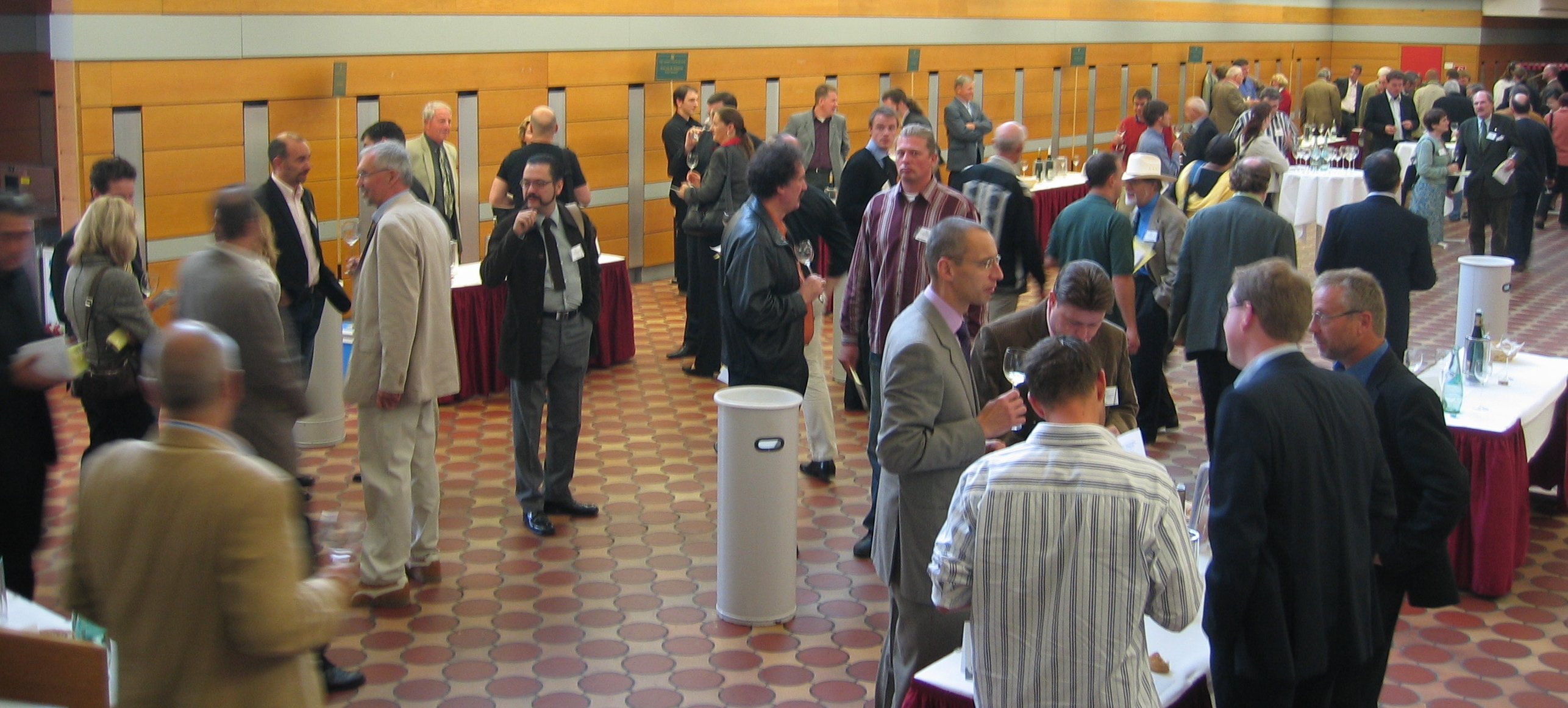
2007 Trier VDP Großer Ring auction pre-tasting.

There are two major wine growers' associations in the Mosel region, the Großer Ring, which is a regional section of the VDP, and the Bernkasteler Ring. They both arrange annual wine auctions of top wines. Producers can submit their wines to the VDP for taste testing to qualify as reserve wines known as Erste Lage (meaning first site). These wines are subject to several regulations; for example, the harvesting must be by hand and the yield must not exceed 220 cases per acre (50 hl/ha).
