= Geisenheim Alumni Association =

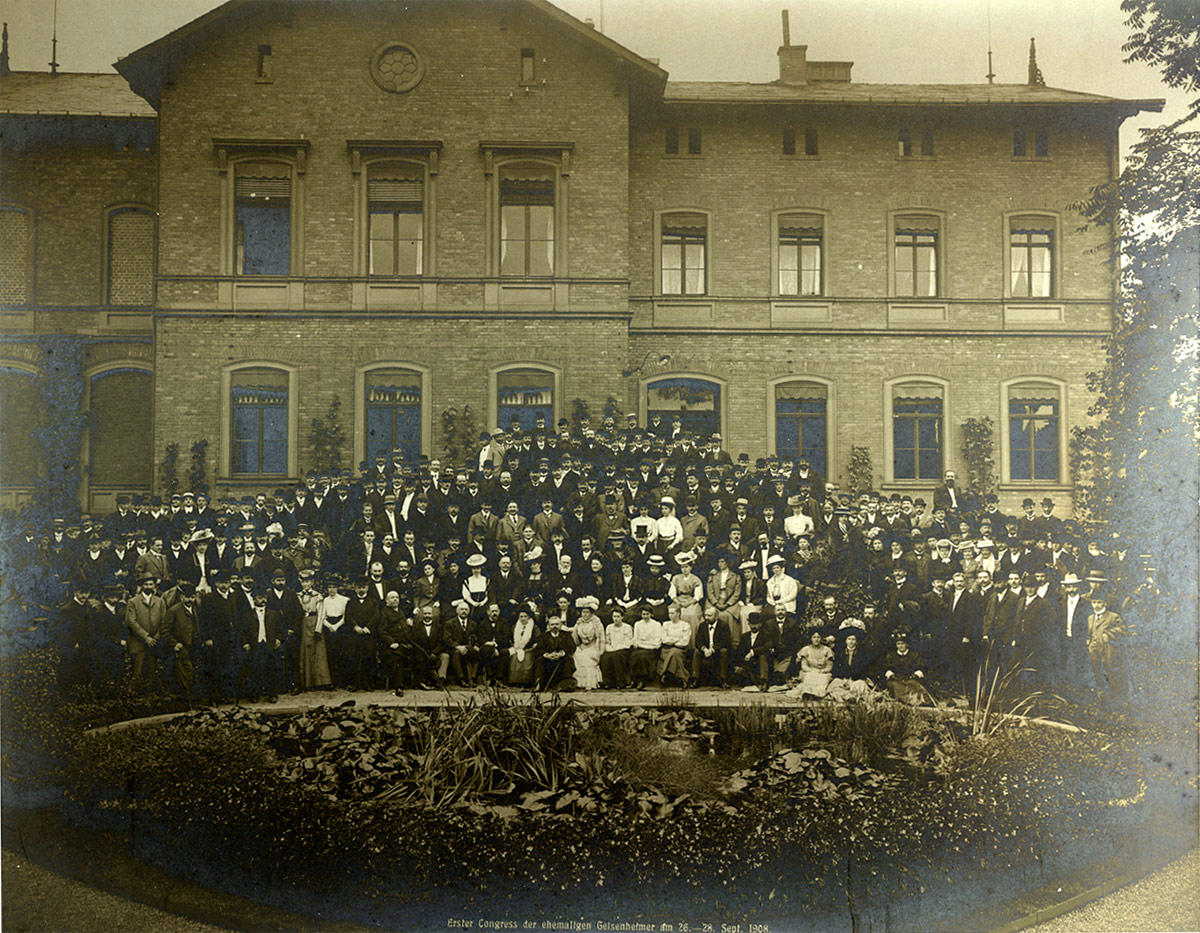
First Congress of Vereinigung Ehemaliger Geisenheimer in 1908

The Vereinigung Ehemaliger Geisenheimer (VEG), since 2002 also known as Geisenheim Alumni Association, is one of the oldest and largest alumni networks in Germany. It was founded in 1894 at the former Royal Prussian Academy for orchards and vineyards (Königlich Preußische Lehranstalt für Obst- und Weinbau) in Geisenheim and represents more than 2,500 alumni worldwide.

The members of the alumni association derive from the fields of viticulture, horticulture, landscape architecture and beverage technology. Its alumni are graduates of today's Geisenheim University and its predecessor organisations like University of Applied Sciences Wiesbaden (1971) or RheinMain University of Applied Sciences (2009).

"The association has the objective to foster research, science and education at Geisenheim University and the institutions of the Research Center Geisenheim, as well as to promote the contact and exchange of experience between alumni, faculty, staff and students."

== History ==
In 1872, the Royal Prussian Academy for orchards and vineyards was founded in Geisenheim/Rheingau by decree of the Prussian Emperor Wilhelm I. Already in the first year six students, initially called ″Eleven″, started their four to six semesters lasting studies in horticulture and viticulture. The proposal to establish an association of former students came from the then first director of the research institute, Ökonomierat Rudolf Goethe. In the founding protocol of the Association on May 13, 1894, the main objectives were defined: linking function between the educational site and its graduates, placement of jobs matching the professional competence with appropriate remuneration and continuing vocational training of graduates.
