= Wachenheim, Alzey-Worms =

Wachenheim
- Municipality
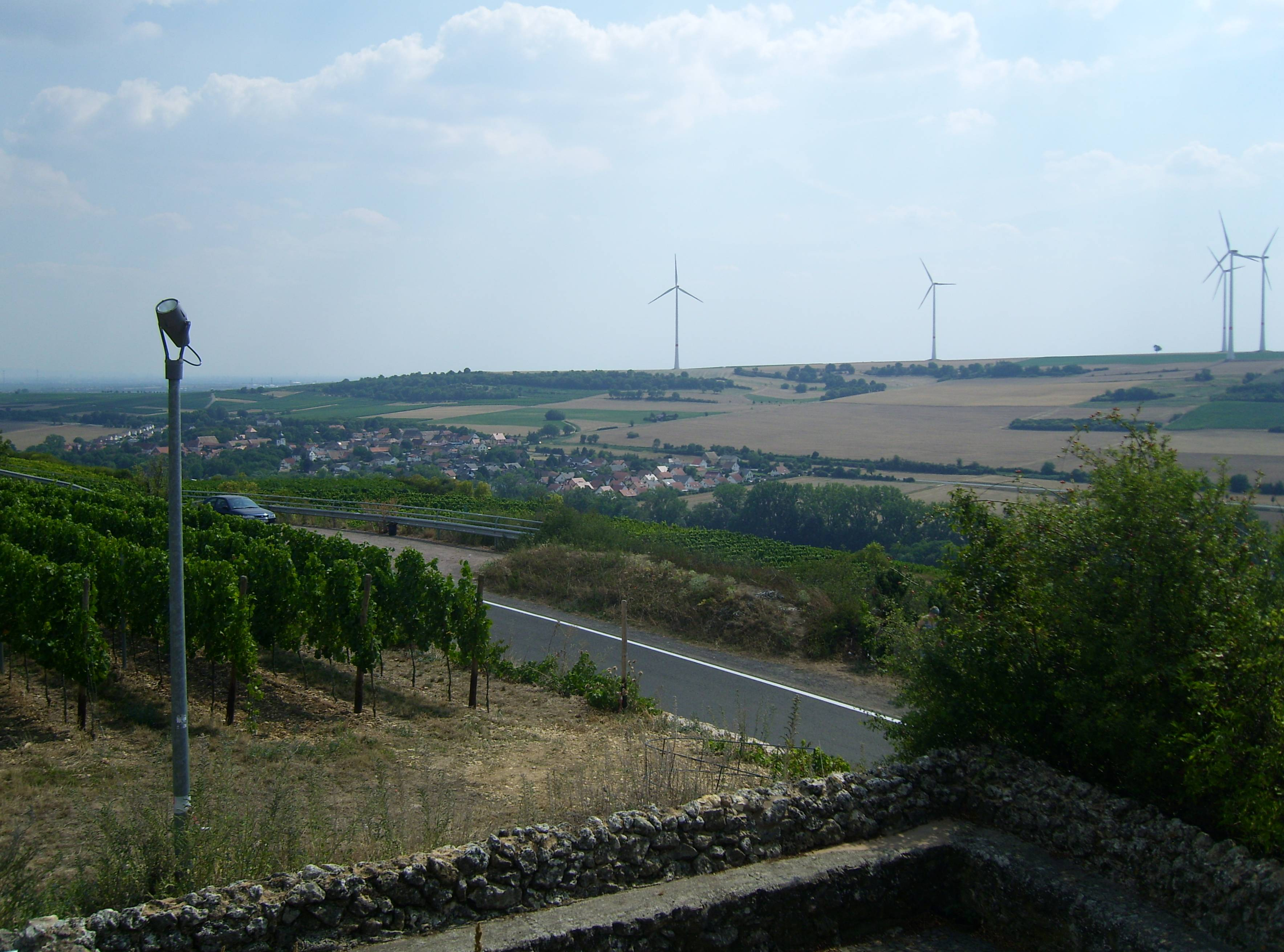
- Wachenheim seen from the Zellertaler Ehrenmal

- Coat of arms

- Location of Wachenheim within Alzey-Worms district
- Interactive map of Wachenheim
- Location within Germany Location within Rhineland-Palatinate
- Coordinates: 49°38′12″N 8°10′00″E
- Country: Germany
- State: Rhineland-Palatinate
- District: Alzey-Worms
- Municipal assoc.: Monsheim

Government
  - Mayor (2019–24): Dieter Heinz

Area
  - Total: 3.55 km^{2} (1.37 sq mi)
- Elevation: 168 m (551 ft)

Population (2025-12-31)
  - Total: 740
  - Density: 210/km^{2} (540/sq mi)
- Time zone: UTC+01:00 (CET)
  - Summer (DST): UTC+02:00 (CEST)
- Postal codes: 67591
- Dialling codes: 06243
- Vehicle registration: AZ
- Website: www.wachenheim.org

Wachenheim (German pronunciation: [ˈvaxn̩haɪm]) is an Ortsgemeinde – a municipality belonging to a Verbandsgemeinde, a kind of collective municipality – in the Alzey-Worms district in Rhineland-Palatinate, Germany.

== Geography ==
=== Location ===
The municipality lies in Rhenish Hesse on the river Pfrimm, a 42.7 km-long left-bank tributary to the Rhine. It belongs to the Verbandsgemeinde of Monsheim, whose seat is in the like-named municipality. Wachenheim is nestled in the Zellertal valley region and to the west borders right on the Palatinate at neighbouring Niefernheim, an outlying centre of the municipality of Zellertal. Running the length of the like-named valley is Bundesstraße 47.

Wachenheim is the eastern entrance to the Zellertal, and 1.5 km of the heavily used Bundesstraße 47 lies within the municipality's limits. In 2006 the Ortsgemeinde and the Verbandsgemeinde strengthened their efforts to do something about the high traffic by working with higher authorities. After a traffic count in 2005, the number of vehicles passing on the B 47 in the Wachenheim area had been found to be roughly 7,000 in 24 hours on average.

== History ==
=== Prehistory ===
The many archaeological finds in the Pfrimm valley show that the climatically favourable countryside was settled even in prehistory.

Johannes Würth's self-publication Heimatbuch für Wachenheim an der Pfrimm unter Berücksichtigung seiner Umgebung (1930) yields some information:

From the time about 2000 BC, some little pots together with a ring of baked clay of the crudest kind were found in a grave during clearing work on Sülzer Weg in 1896. Würth furthermore reports that finds from the New Stone Age (5000 to 2000 BC) in the western part of the Wormsgau were quite numerous.

Around the municipal areas of Wachenheim, Mölsheim and Monsheim, evidence of settlement from several prehistoric periods was found, including Hinkelstein, Flomborn, Hallstatt and La Tène.

=== Roman times ===
Uneven crop growth in 1905 led to digging in the area between Harxheimer Straße (Bundesstraße 47) and the river Pfrimm in the summer of 1905. Well preserved foundations of a Roman villa were thereby unearthed. The digs were documented with drawings and photographs. Unfortunately, the site was thereafter levelled and then used once again as a cropfield. Beginning in 1972, the land was built up. Only a street running parallel to Harxheimer Straße recalls the villa in its name – Römerstraße, or “Romans’ Street”.

In the summer of 1992, in a building excavation in this same area (Diehlgartenstraße), a millstone was brought to light along with some Roman potsherds. The State Office for Care of Monuments in Mainz describes the find as follows:

“The stone is made of a hard sandstone and has a diameter of 82 cm, is 33 cm thick and weighs 355 kg. It belonged with a second stone, which has not been preserved, to a Roman gristmill, which, owing to the stone’s size and weight was run by either a draught animal or waterpower.

“The lower millstone sat fast, the upper was turned, for which the two conical openings beside the hole in the millstone, the so-called swallowtail-shaped recesses, stone and wooden axle were bound tightly together by means of an iron plate of matching shape.

“Mills of this size were found in great Roman estate operations, which are known from many examples in Rhenish Hesse and the Palatinate, among others, also one in Wachenheim. They convey an impression of the capability of Roman technology and likewise of Roman agriculture from the first to fourth centuries AD.”

=== Middle Ages ===
On 29 August 765, Wachenheim had its first documentary mention in a donation document from Lorsch Abbey as Wacchanheim. It played a rôle as seat of the Landgericht auf dem Kaldenberg (a court).

Bishop Burchard, builder of Worms Cathedral, acknowledged in 1141 the income from fields and vineyards in the villa of Wachenheim, Mölsheim and Flörsheim that was owed the brethren of Saint Andrew's Church Foundation (Andreasstift) in Worms.

Beginning in the 12th century, the noble family Leiningen held the lordship and court rights over the Kalte(n) Berge by Wachenheim off der prym (“Cold Mountains near Wachenheim on the Pfrimm”).

=== Modern times ===
In 1689, as throughout the Palatinate and Rhenish Hesse, even Wachenheim was not spared the ravages of the Nine Years' War.

On the occasion of Friedrich von Botzheim's christening on 28 November 1766, King Frederick II of Prussia and Crown Prince William both stood godfather. The family von Botzheim, at this time holders of the so-called Wachenheimer Oberschloss (“Wachenheim Upper Castle”) were related to the highest Prussian nobility and the Prussian court.

With the 1815 Congress of Vienna, Wachenheim passed to the Grand Duchy of Hesse, whereas its neighbours to the west in the Zeller valley (Niefernheim, Harxheim and Zell) were annexed to the Kingdom of Bavaria.

After 1919, Wachenheim became part of the People's State of Hesse (Province of Rhenish Hesse); the western part of the Zeller valley was assigned to Bavaria's Palatine province. Sharp-eyed hikers in the Wachenheim municipal area can still discover a border stone with the abbreviations GH (for Großherzogtum Hessen) and KB (for Königreich Bayern) during their explorations.

=== Since the Second World War ===
With the founding of the state of Rhineland-Palatinate in 1946, the whole Zeller valley became part of the same state, although Wachenheim was assigned to the Regierungsbezirk of Rheinhessen while the western Zeller valley was assigned to the Regierungsbezirk of Pfalz.

With administrative reform in 1972, both these Regierungsbezirke were united into the Regierungsbezirk of Rheinhessen-Pfalz. However, even today, the Zeller valley is not quite united: Wachenheim and Mölsheim belonged until 1969 to the old Worms district, and thereafter to the Alzey-Worms district and the newly founded administrative entity of the Verbandsgemeinde of Monsheim, whereas the western Zeller valley was assigned to the Donnersbergkreis (district) and the Verbandsgemeinde of Göllheim.

=== Today ===
Wachenheim's economy includes five full-time and four part-time winemaking businesses. In addition, there are seven mixed agricultural enterprises and one exclusively arable farm. Overall, farmland spans 311 hectares, including 80 hectares used for winegrowing.

Wachenheim's inhabitants mainly earn their livings at jobs in the Worms area and the greater Ludwigshafen-Mannheim-Heidelberg area (Rhine-Neckar area), as well as in the Mainz-Wiesbaden area and on to Frankfurt am Main.

=== Population development ===
With the new development areas In den Bachstaden and Harxheimer Weg laid out between 1999 and 2003 and the filling in of a few gaps in the older development area Mühlbrunnen laid out between 1968 and 1970, a small rise in the population figure is foreseen.

== Politics ==
=== Municipal council ===
The council is made up of 12 council members, who were elected at the municipal election held on 7 June 2009, and the honorary mayor as chairman.

The municipal election held on 7 June 2009 yielded the following results:

	SPD	FWG	Total
1989	6	5	11
1994	5	7	12
1999	4	8	12
2004	4	8	12
2009	4	8	12

=== Mayors ===
- 1951 - 1979 Karl Würth
- 1979 - 1982 Willi Johannes (SPD)
- 1982 - 1984 Dieter Jürgen Günther
- 1984 - 1988 Jakob Becker (SPD)
- 1988 - 1992 Regina Johannes (SPD)
- 1992 - 1994 Karl Liesy (SPD)
- 1994 - 2004 Wolf Dieter Egli (FWG)
- 2004–present Dieter Heinz (FWG)

=== Coat of arms ===
The municipality's arms might be described thus: Or three quails sable.

Wachenheim's arms are modelled on those borne by the local noble family Druschel von Wachenheim. Such arms are known to have been borne by this family as early as 1280. However, the three birds in those early arms were thrushes, meant as a canting charge for the name Druschel, as “thrush” is Drossel in German. The family Druschel von Wachenheim was a longtime resident noble family, but they eventually died out. The birds in the arms later became quails, which themselves are canting for the municipality's name, Wachenheim, as “quail” is Wachtel in German.

The arms were granted Wachenheim on 12 December 1927.

=== Flag ===
Wachenheim's flag, according to the certificate issued by the now abolished Regierungsbezirk administration is to be five horizontal stripes of like breadth, alternating between yellow and black with the municipality's coat of arms in the middle.

== Culture and sightseeing ==
=== Local dialect ===
The local speech in Wachenheim is Rhenish-Hessian, but with a heavy admixture of Palatinate German. It is easy to tell the difference between a Wachenheimer's dialect and that spoken by one from the neighbouring Palatine village of Niefernheim, even though the two places are only just over a kilometre apart.

== Economy and infrastructure ==
=== Transport ===
The former railway station is three kilometres west of the Monsheim railway junction, where the Worms–Alzey and Monsheim–Grünstadt–Neustadt lines meet. The Zeller Valley Railway, the line from Monsheim via Wachenheim and Langmeil to Kaiserslautern, was operated on Sundays and holidays in the warmer months in 2006 by the Eis Valley Railway Society (Eistalbahn e.V.) after regular traffic on the line ceased in the 1970s.

Given Wachenheim's favourable location with regard to transport, on the one hand with the B 47 running through the municipality, and on the other with the A 61 motorway with its Worms-Pfeddersheim and Mörstadt interchanges being nearby, makes it easy to reach. The district headquarters of Alzey is 16 km away, and to Kirchheimbolanden, seat of the neighbouring Donnersbergkreis, it is likewise 16 km. To the centre of Worms, it is 17 km.

In neighbouring Monsheim to the east, the seat of the like-named Verbandsgemeinde, Bundesstraßen 47 and 271 cross each other, the latter of which, beginning in Bockenheim, is called the Deutsche Weinstraße (German Wine Route).

== See also ==
Wachenheim an der Weinstraße
