= Weingut Battenfeld Spanier =

German winery

- Location: Hohen-Sülzen, Germany
- Coordinates: 49°37′08″N 8°13′14″E
- Appellation: Rheinhessen
- Key people: Hans-Oliver Spanier
- Varietal: Riesling
- Website: www.kuehlingandbattenfeld.com/en/battenfeldspanier

Weingut Battenfeld Spanier is a German wine grower and producer based in Hohen-Sülzen, in the Wonnegau district of the wine-growing region of Rheinhessen, Germany. Weingut Battenfeld Spanier is a member of the Verband Deutscher Prädikatsweingüter (VDP) since 1998.

== History ==
The Battenfeld Spanier winery was founded by Hans-Oliver Spanier in 1991 in accordance with principles of organic farming and biodynamic methods since 2005. Soon he decided that his estate would be used to grow wine, when he tried a 1990 Silvaner dry from Heyl zu Herrnsheim.

== Vineyards and wine ==
Hohen-Sülzen is located the southernmost corner of the Wonnegau, a dry sunny region with calcareous subsoils. Battenfeld Spanier works with 40 hectares vineyards, including vines in Frauenberg (Flörsheim-Dalsheim), Kirchenstück (Hohen-Sülzen), Zellerweg am Schwarzen Herrgott (Mölsheim) and Kreuzberg (Zellertal). These are selected sites, capable to produce "Grosses Gewächs", top-level dry wines. Chief enologist is the Geisenheimer Hans-Oliver Spanier.

The leading grape variety is Riesling, with 75%, followed by pinot noir 15%.
