= Zellertal (region) =

Valley region in Rhineland-Palatinate, Germany

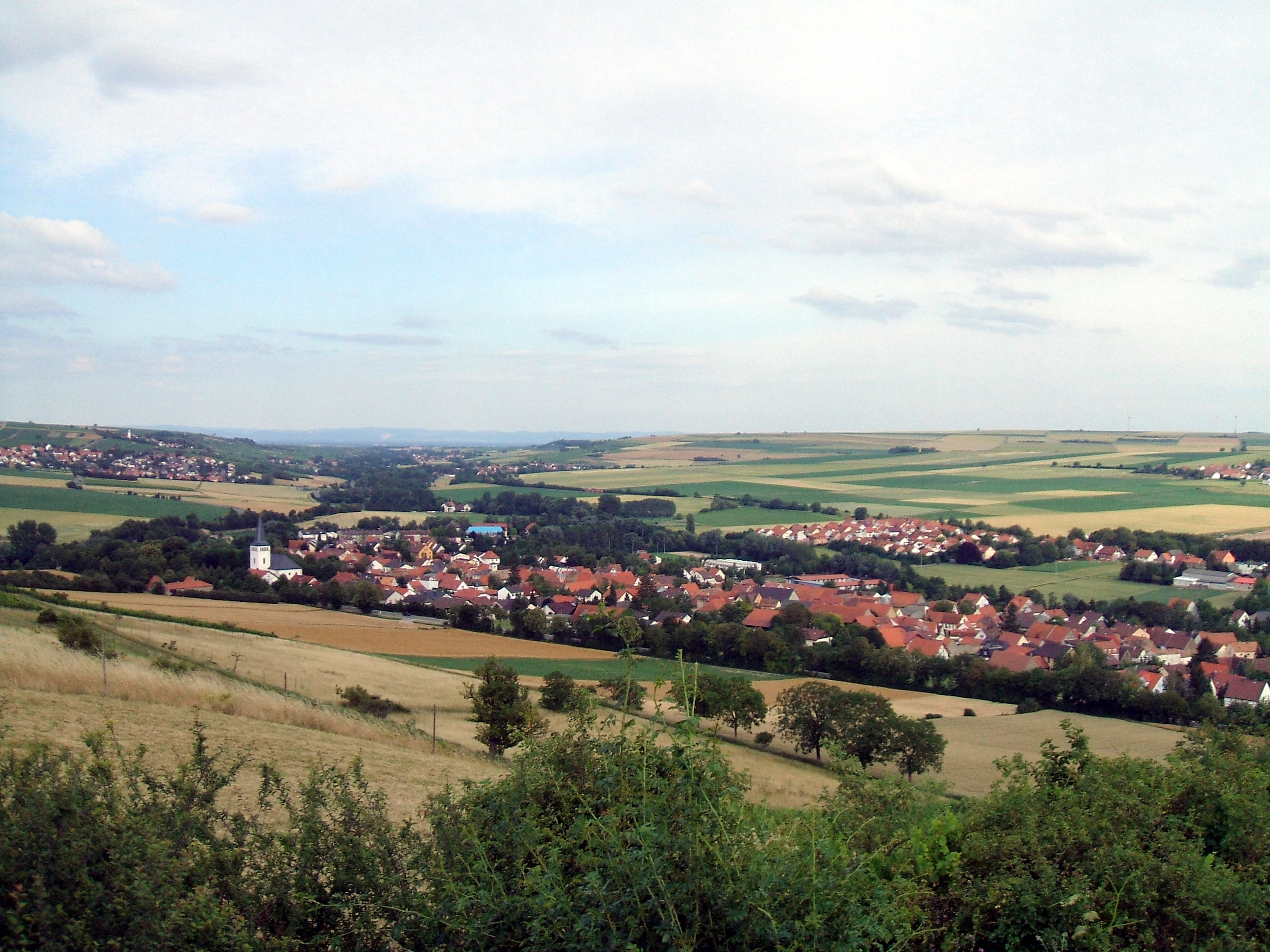
- View of Albisheim in the Zellertal
- Floor elevation: 185DE-NHN
- Length: 12

Geography
- Location: Rhineland-Palatinate, Germany
- Coordinates: 49°38′44″N 8°7′25″E
- Mountain range: North Palatine Uplands
- Rivers: Pfrimm with Leiselsbach (left) and Ammelbach (right)
- Interactive map of Zellertal

The Zellertal (German pronunciation: [ˈtsɛlɐtaːl]) is a valley region in the east of the North Palatine Uplands in the German state of Rhineland-Palatinate. Its western part belongs to Palatine Donnersbergkreis, its eastern part to Rhenish Hessian Alzey-Worms. The valley is named after the old municipality of Zell, which became part of the new Zellertal municipality in 1976.

== Geography ==
The Zellertal is a trough-shaped valley with relatively gently sides and is bounded in the north and south by two chains of low hills that are under 300 m. The distance between the two hill ridges is 2 to 3 kilometres. In between, the valley stretches from west to east, sheltered from north winds. Flowing through the valley in this direction is the Pfrimm, a left ban tributary of the Rhine which is just under 43 kilometres long.

The exit to the valley in the east lies at a height of about 135 m in Rhenish Hesse in the collective municipality of Monsheim, to which belong the first 3 valley parishes of Monsheim, Wachenheim and Mölsheim as we travel upriver. To the west, on the Palatine side, follow the next three parishes of Zellertal (Niefernheim, Zell and Harxheim) and the parishes of Einselthum, Albisheim and Marnheim. The Zellertal ends here after 12 km at 185 m.

== Sights ==
The symbol of the valley is the 15-metre-high Zellertal Memorial which can be seen from a long way off. The Expressionist New Gothic monument was built in 1928 as a war memorial in honour of the fallen of the First World War. It is located on an exposed viewing point near the K 64 which runs along the hillside between Zell and Mölsheim. The Baroque pilgrimage church of Zell is dedicated to Philip of Zell, who was elevated to the sainthood in the Bishopric of Speyer. Other sights are described in the individual village articles.

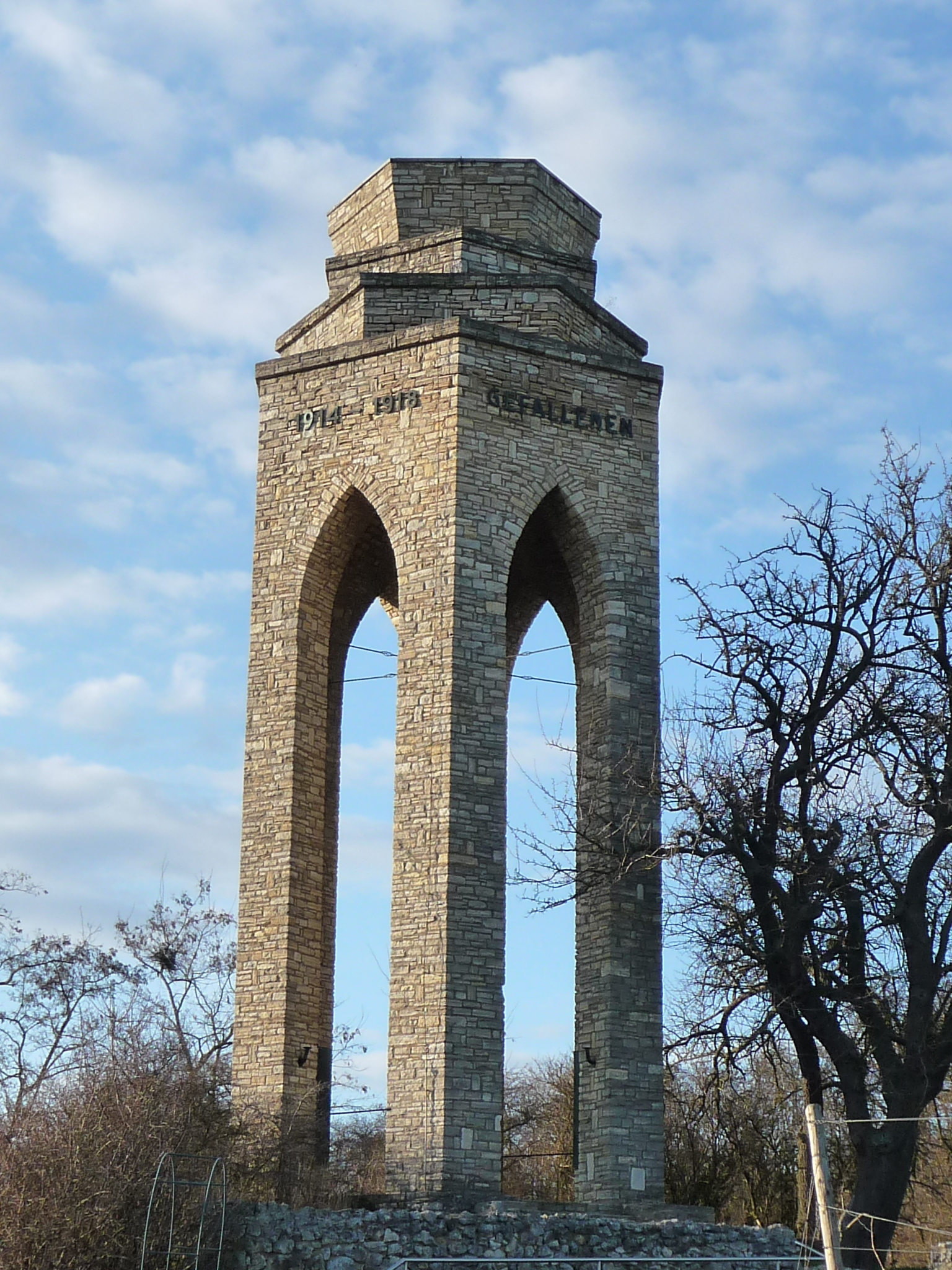
Zellertal Memorial

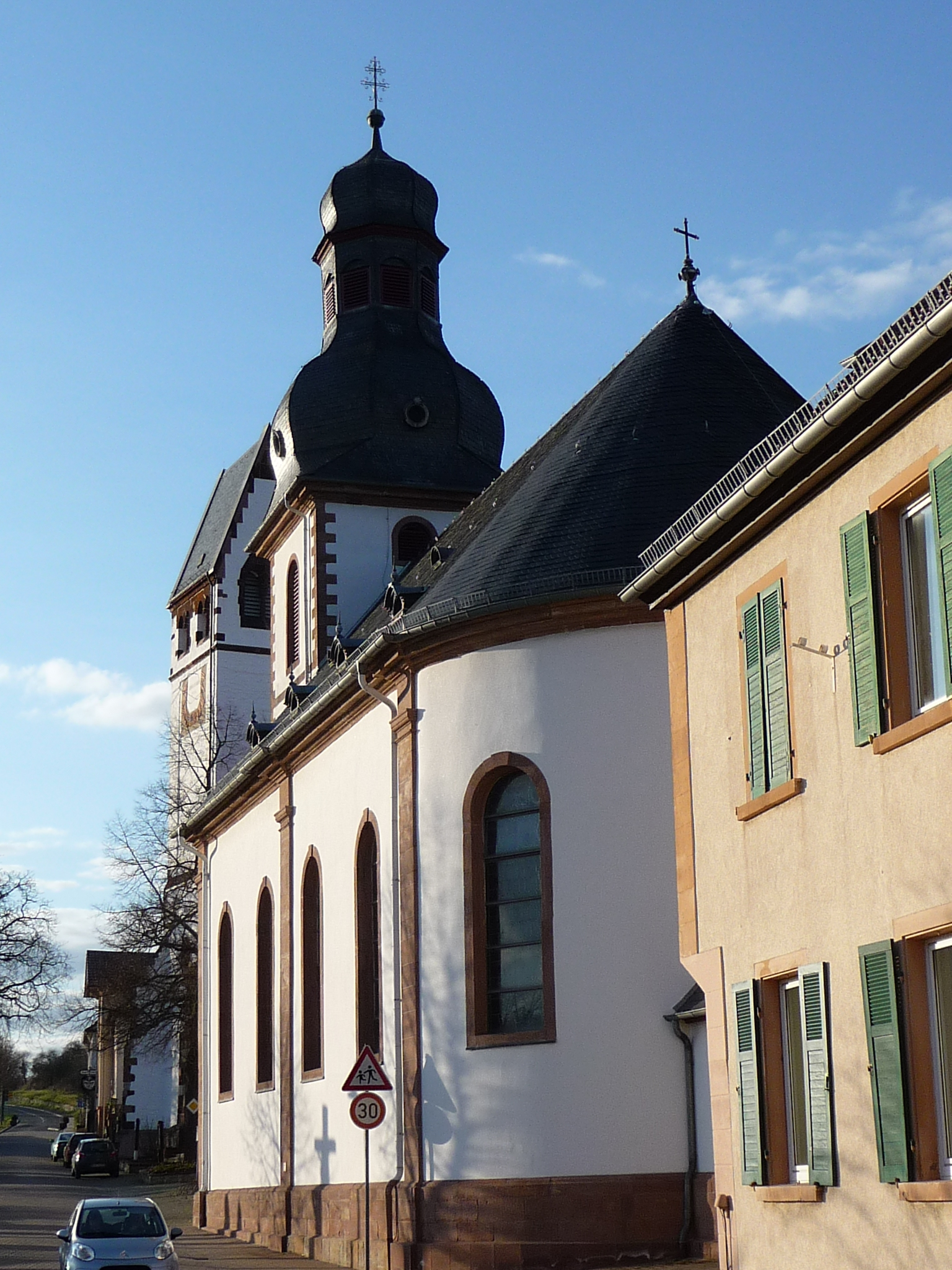
Pilgrimage church of Zell - exterior

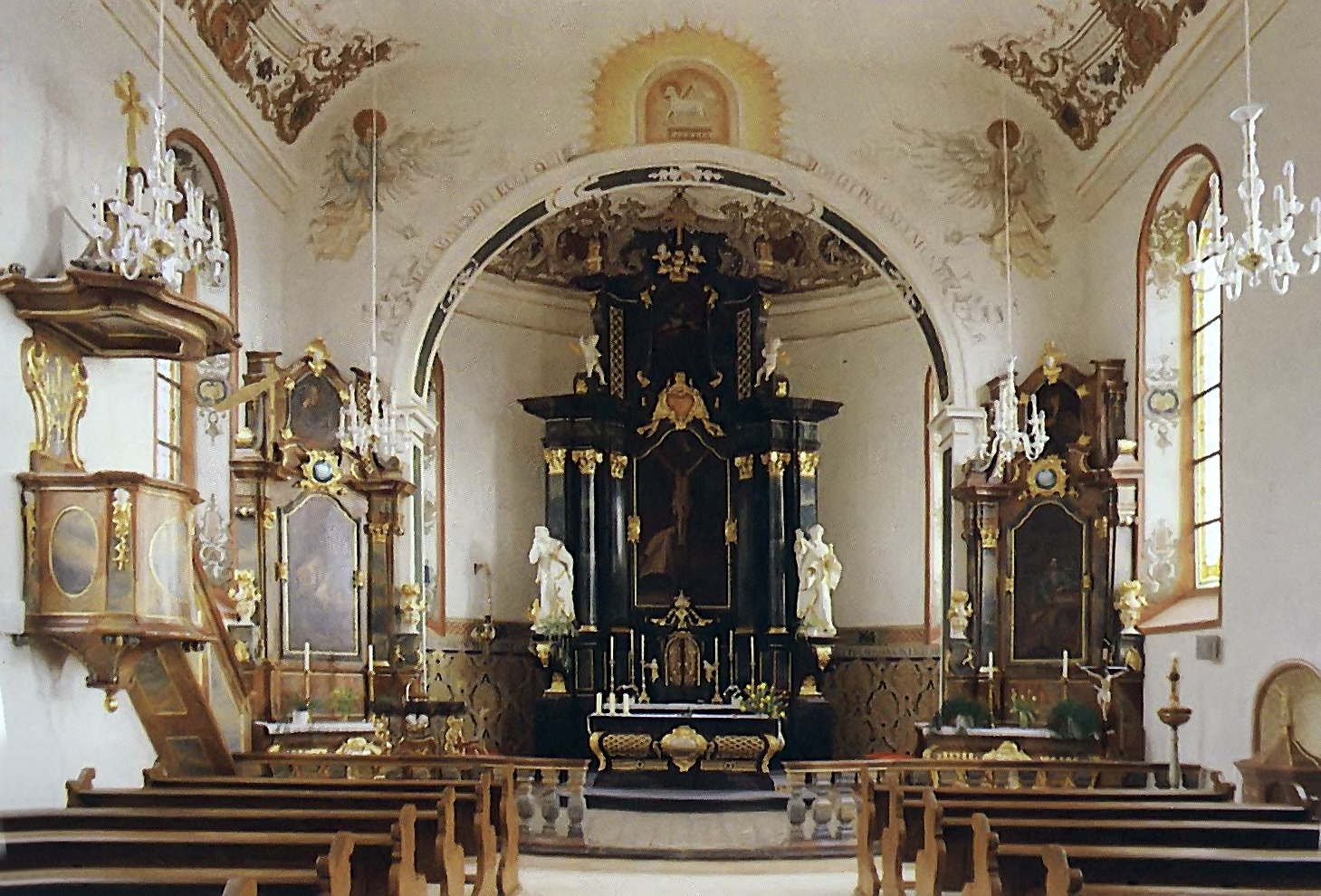
Pilgrimage church of Zell - interior

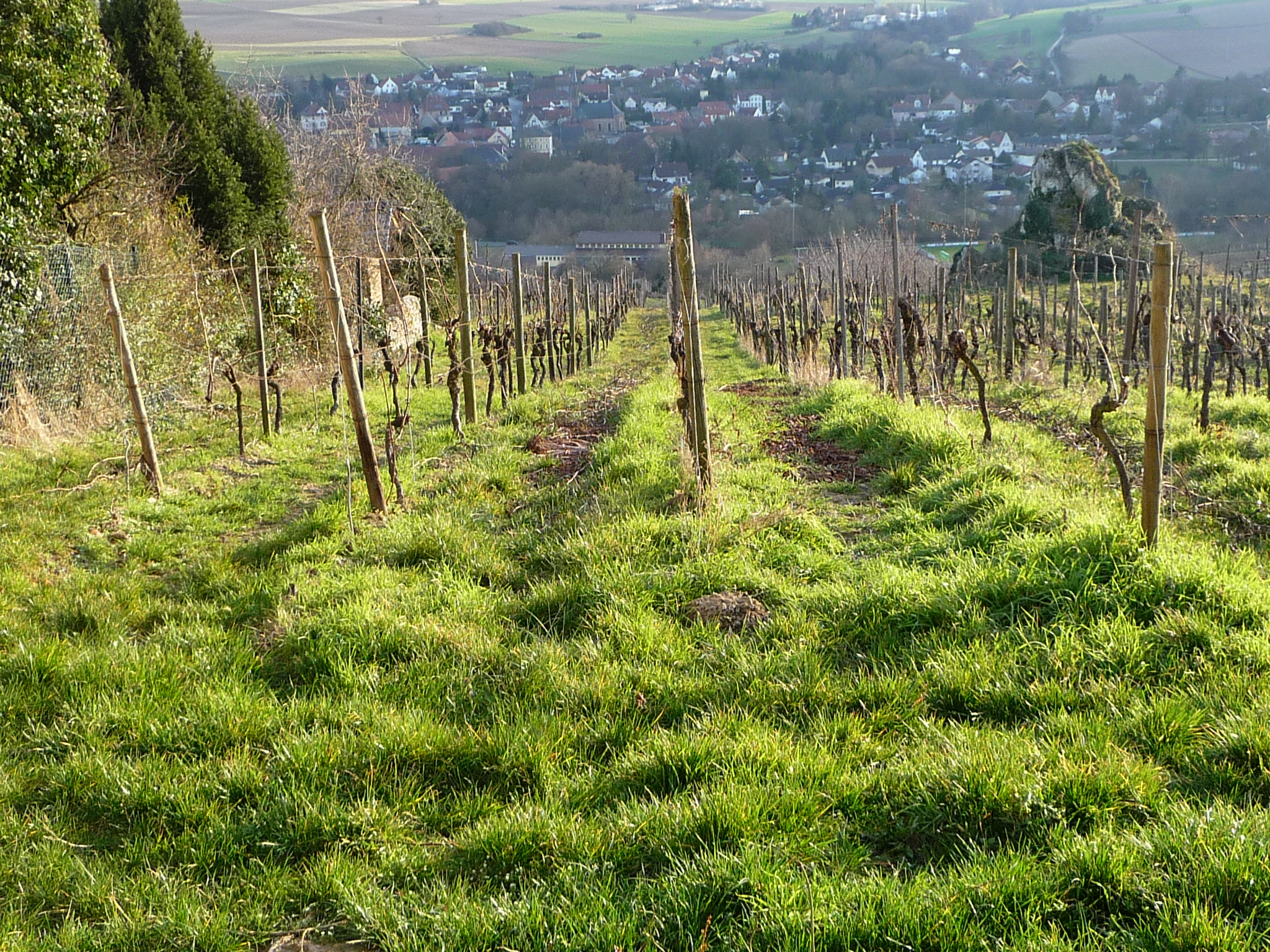
Vineyards in the Zellertal

== Economy and infrastructure ==
=== Viticulture ===
The Zellertal is the northern end of the Palatine wine region; while the Rhenish Hesse wine area begins at the eastern end of the valley. The Zellertal wine region covers a larger area that the valley itself, has 15 vineyards with a lagen with a vine area of 550 hectares. The wine region includes other wine-growing municipalities such as Bischheim, Rittersheim and Gauersheim, which are in the side valley of the Leiselsbach, a left bank tributary of the Pfrimm.

=== Transport ===
The Zellertal is accessed by the B 47 (Worms–Marnheim), which runs between the A 63 (Kaiserslautern–Mainz) in the west and the B 271 (Neustadt an der Weinstraße–Alzey) in the east. On the western edge of Wachenheim, the B 47 has been extended to the west as a ring road.

On Sundays and holidays from the beginning of May to the end of October the Zeller Valley Railway runs from Monsheim via Langmeil to Kaiserslautern.
