= Zellertal =

- Municipality
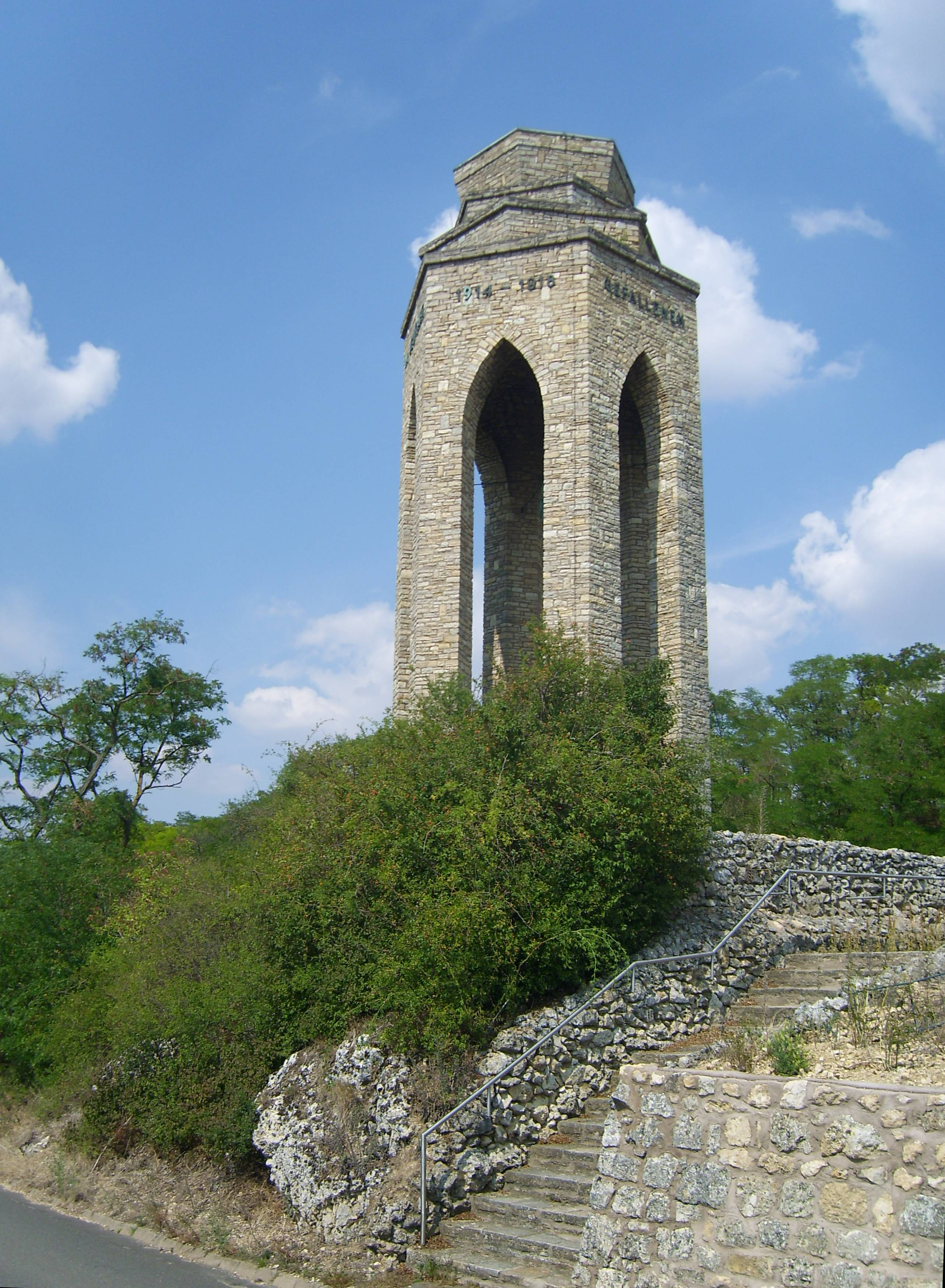
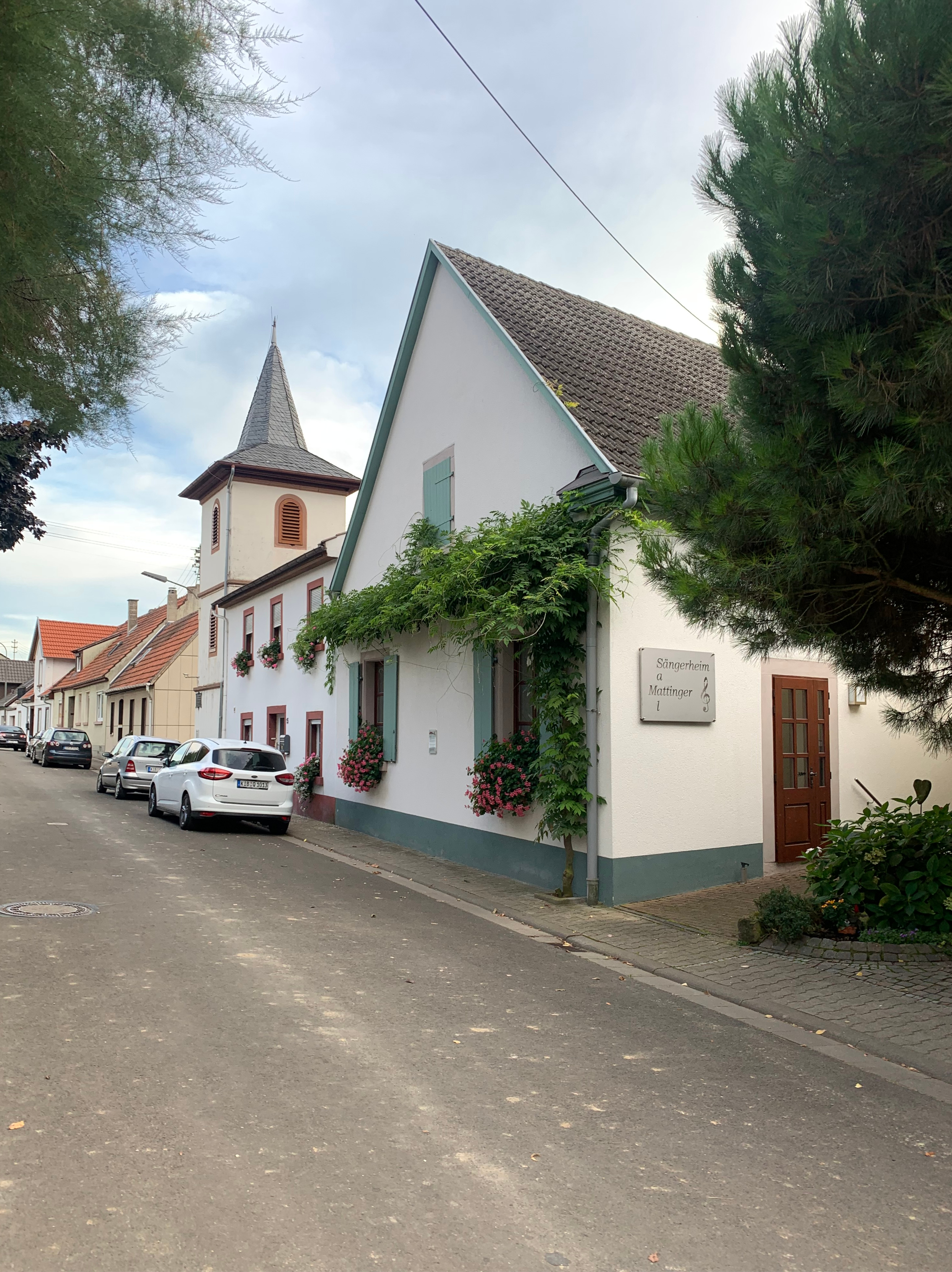
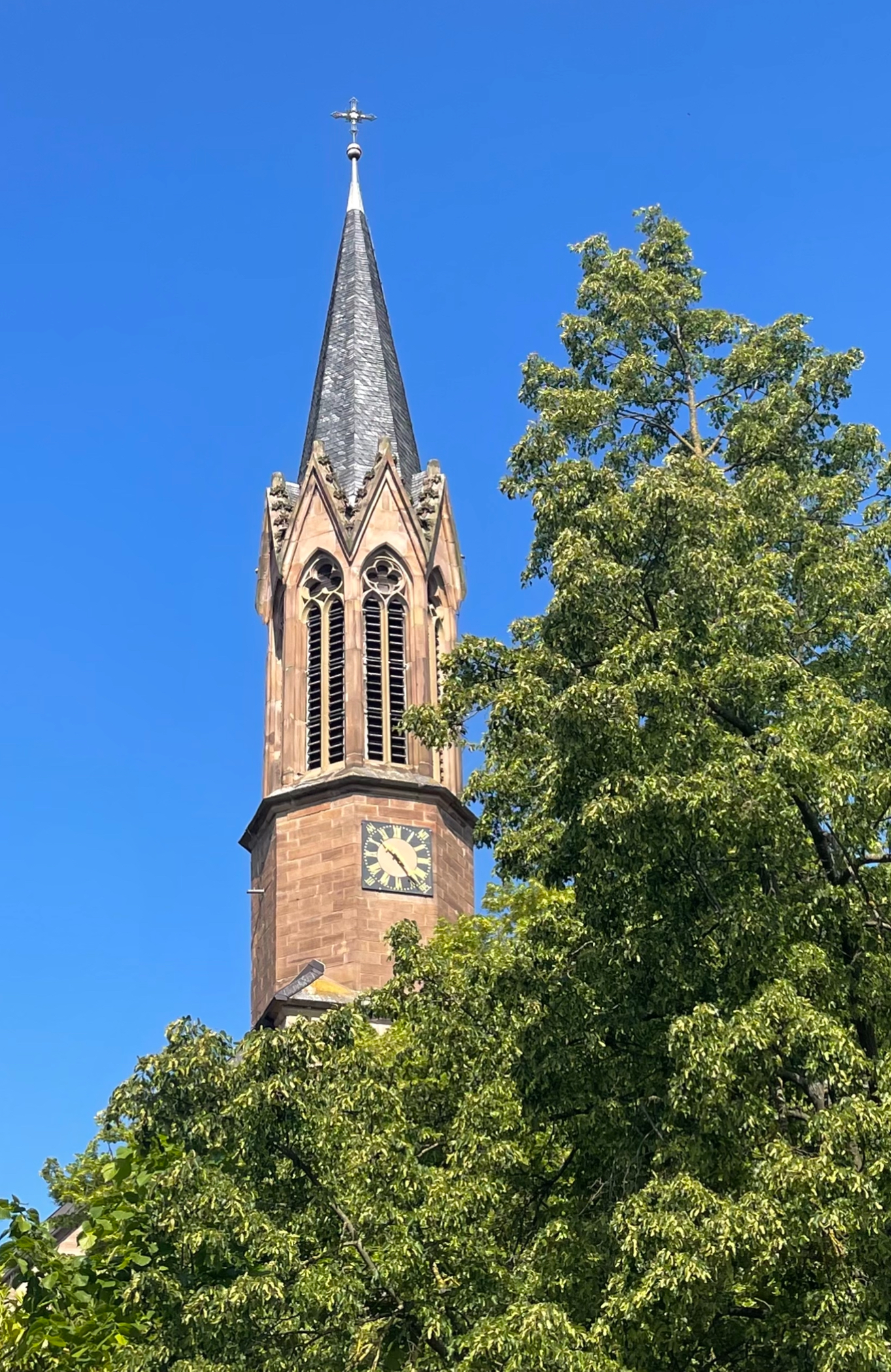
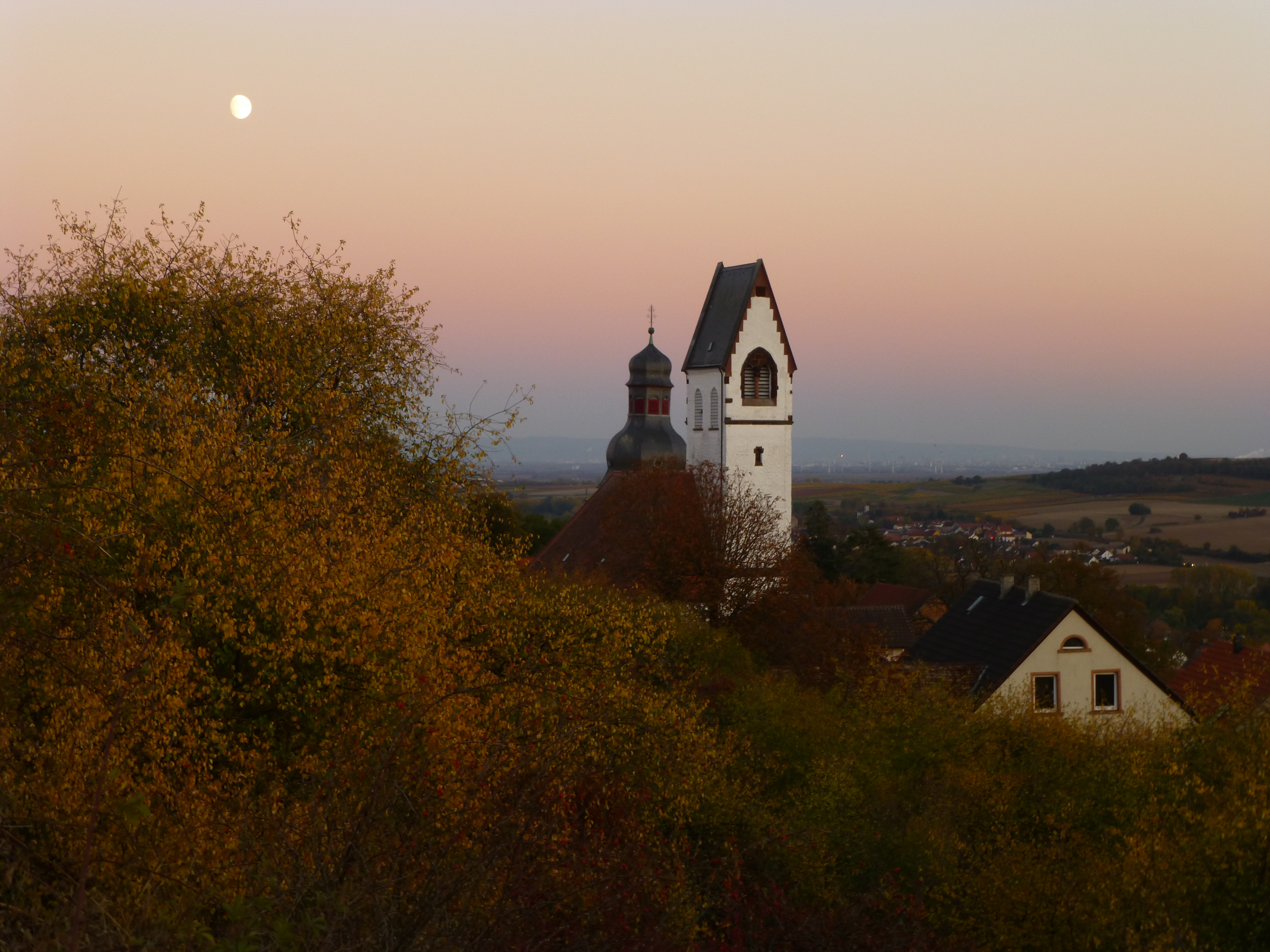
- Zeller Denkmal Niefernheim Harxheim Zell

- Coat of arms

- Location of Zellertal within Donnersbergkreis district
- Interactive map of Zellertal
- Location within Germany Location within Rhineland-Palatinate
- Coordinates: 49°38′57″N 08°08′22″E
- Country: Germany
- State: Rhineland-Palatinate
- District: Donnersbergkreis
- Municipal assoc.: Göllheim
- Subdivisions: 3 Ortsteile

Government
  - Mayor (2019–24): Christian Lauer

Area
  - Total: 6.94 km^{2} (2.68 sq mi)
- Elevation: 205 m (673 ft)

Population (2025-12-31)
  - Total: 1,138
  - Density: 164/km^{2} (425/sq mi)
- Time zone: UTC+01:00 (CET)
  - Summer (DST): UTC+02:00 (CEST)
- Postal codes: 67308
- Dialling codes: 06355
- Vehicle registration: KIB
- Website: www.goellheim.de

Zellertal (German pronunciation: [ˈtsɛlɐtaːl]) is a municipality in the Donnersbergkreis district, in Rhineland-Palatinate, Germany. The villages of Zell, Harxheim and Niefernheim form Zellertal.

Zellertal is located in the eponymous region, which in turn is part of the Palatinate wine region and borders on the Rhenish Hesse wine region.

== Geography ==
=== Location ===
The three villages that make up the municipality are located between Worms and Kaiserslautern in the Rhenish-Hessian Hills. They are the easternmost part of Donnersbergkreis district. The Pfrimm river flows through Harxheim and Niefernheim, whilst Zell is located further up on the slope of Osterberg hill.

Neighbouring municipalities are Ober-Flörsheim, Mölsheim, Wachenheim, Kindenheim, Bubenheim, Immesheim and Einselthum.

=== Divisions ===
The municipality is divided into three villages:

Division	further inhabited places
Harxheim	Bannmühle, Jüngstmühle, Kurpfalzmühle
Niefernheim	Haus Lauer, Reitzenmühle
Zell	Klosterhof

=== Climate ===
Despite its location in the North Palatinate Zellertal has a milder climate then the rest of the district. It profits of the hillside to the north, protecting the valley from cold snaps. The east–west orientation guarantees a large amount of sunshine each day.

== History ==
The name of Zell derives of the cell (Latin: cella) of Philipp of Zell an eremite and saint who lived in the area in the 8th century. His festival is celebrated yearly on the Sunday after 3 May.

In medieval times the three villages were owned by Hornbach Abbey and given as fief to the Counts of Leiningen.

The municipality in its current shape was formed on 1 January 1976 when the three municipalities of Harxheim (pop. 714), Niefernheim (pop. 188) and Zell (pop. 228) merged.

== Demographics ==
=== Religion ===
The Catholics are part of the Diocese of Speyer, the Protestants of the Evangelical Church of the Palatinate. Zell has a church for each denomination, Harxheim has a Protestant one.

=== Population ===
The change in population from 1815 to 2017 in the current municipal borders.

Year	population
1815	987
1835	1.148
1871	961
1905	978
1939	1.057
1950	1.341

Year	population
1961	1.302
1970	1.261
1987	1.189
2005	1.246
2017	1.157

== Politics ==
=== Council ===
The village council is composed of 16 members who were elected in a personalized proportional representation in the local elections on June 9, 2024, and the honorary mayor as chairman.

=== Heraldry ===
The coat of arms shows Saint Philipp of Zell, who could be seen on the three villages individual coats of arms. The grapes symbolise viticulture.

== Culture and sights ==
=== Buildings ===
The village center of Zell is a protected architectural ensemble.

There are several more protected buildings like St. Philipp's Church, several old wineries or the Protestant church of Harxheim.

The most famous sight is the Ehrenmal known as Zeller Denkmal (Zell monument) in the vernacular. It was built in 1928 at the road between Zell and Mölsheim and has become a symbol of the whole region.

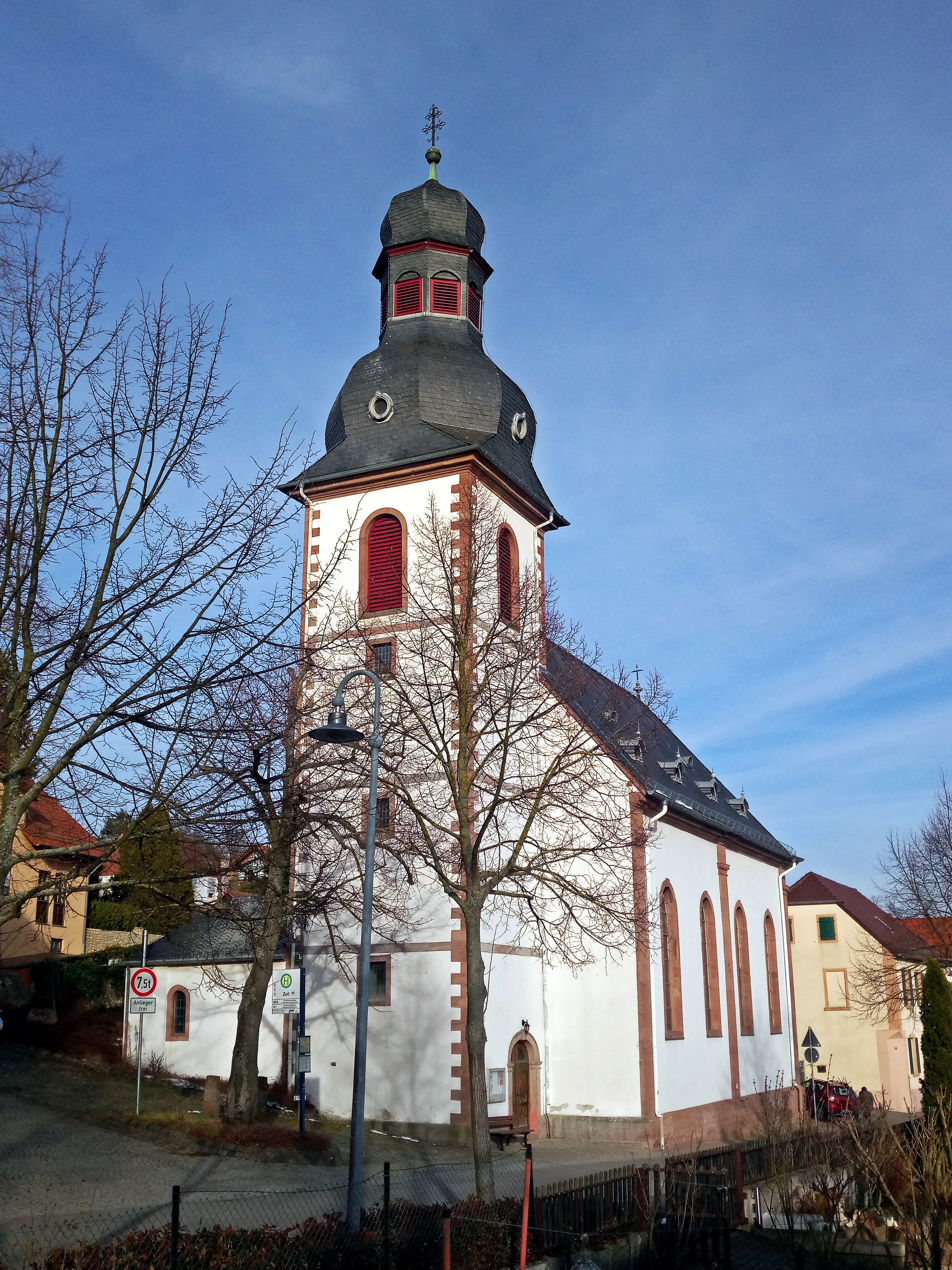
Saint Philipp's Church in Zell

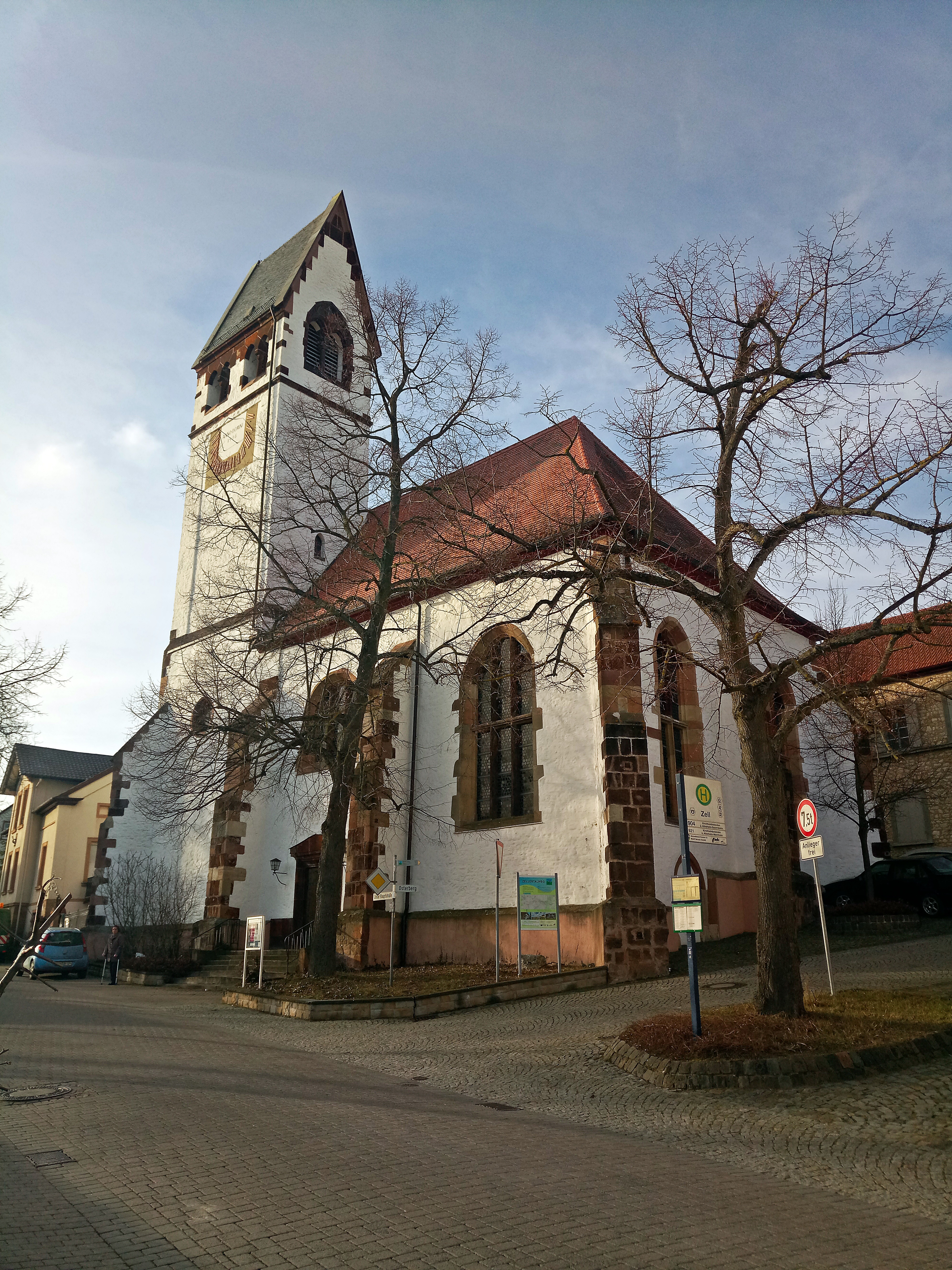
Protestant Church of Zell

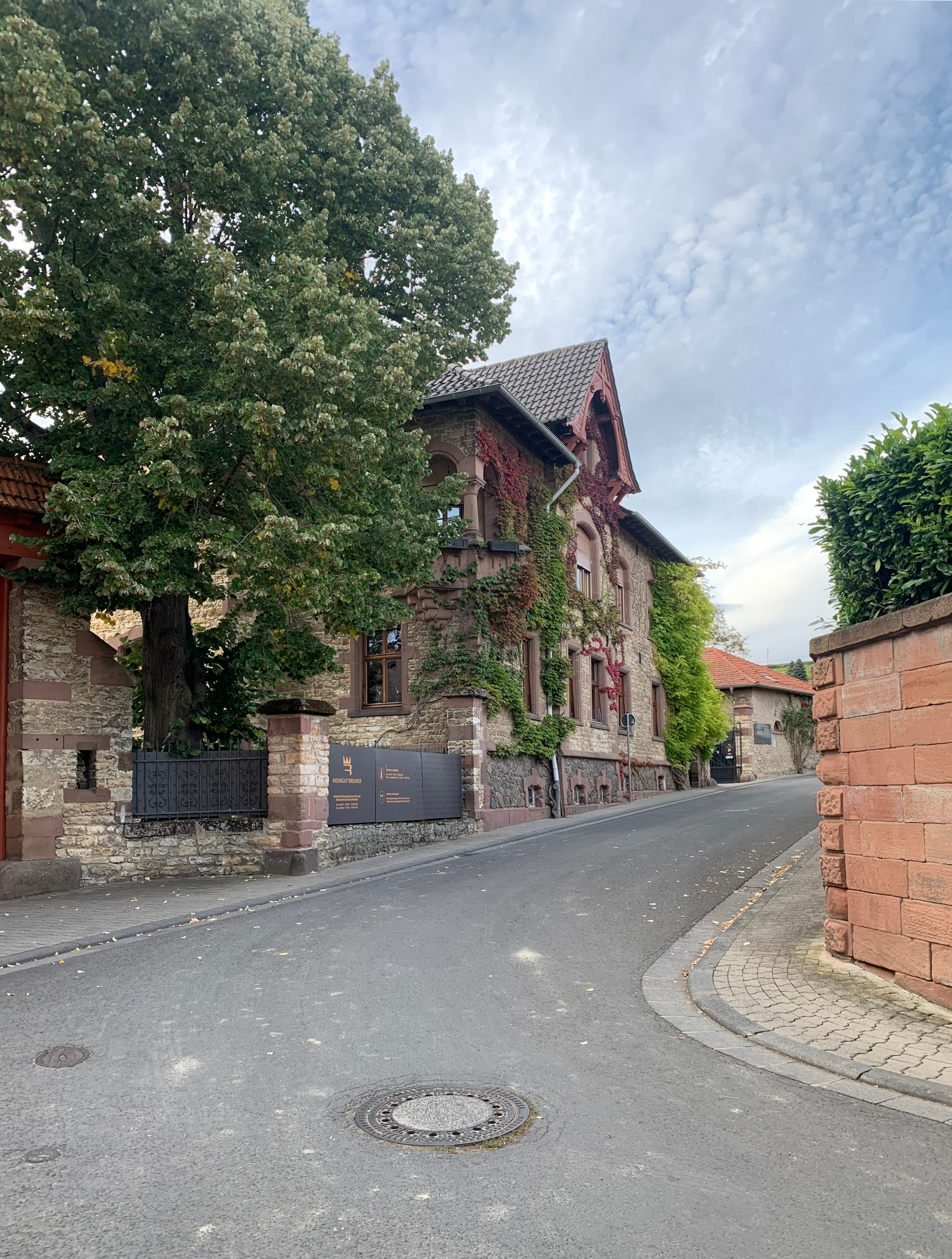
Winery in Niefernheim

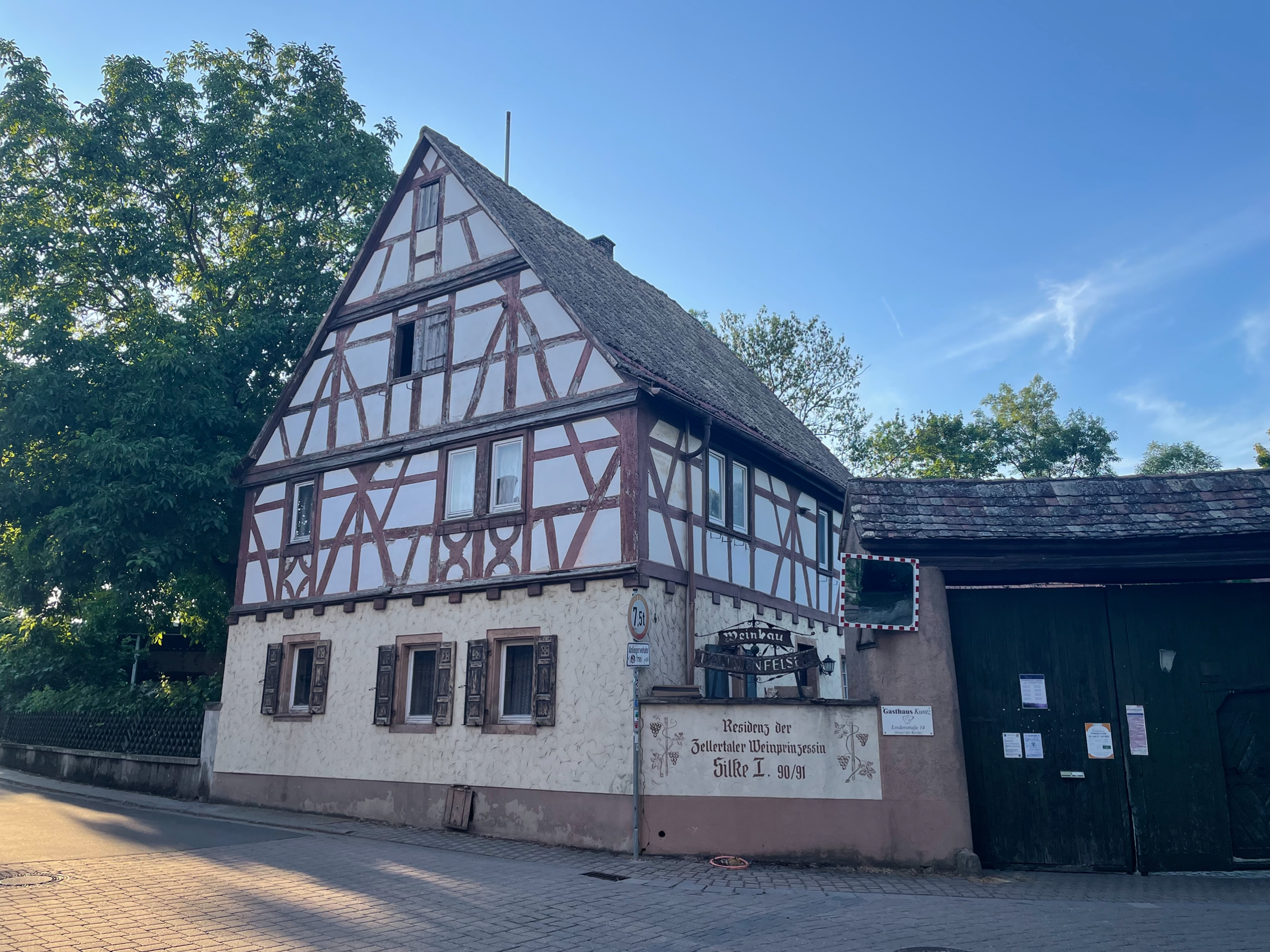
Winery of the Dannenfelser family in Harxheim

=== Nature ===
There are four protected natural monuments in the municipality.

=== Festivals ===
St. Philipps festival is celebrated in May each year. The Parkfest in Zell is celebrated on the fourth weekend of July.

== Economy and infrastructure ==
=== Economy ===
The local economy is based on viticulture and tourism related to viticulture. See Rhineland-Palatinate for a further description of the local viticulture. A wind farm is partly located in the municipal district.

=== Infrastructure ===
==== Roads ====
B47 federal road passes through the valley along the northern edge of Harxheim. Minor roads connect the villages to one another as well as to Albisheim or Ebertsheim.

==== Public transit ====
The three villages are served by bus lines 904 and 921 of the VRN. The latter runs hourly on weekdays between Kirchheimbolanden and Monsheim where trains to Mainz, Alzey or Worms can be reached. Line 904 runs to Göllheim and Eisenberg.

The eponymous Zeller Valley Railway has not been served by regular passenger trains since the 1980s. There was a two-hourly weekend service from 2001 to 2016. The station for the municipality is called Harxheim-Zell.

==== Education ====
Zellertal elementary school is attended by around 200 pupils.
