= Pfrimm Viaduct =

Coordinates: 49°38′16″N 8°2′49.1″E

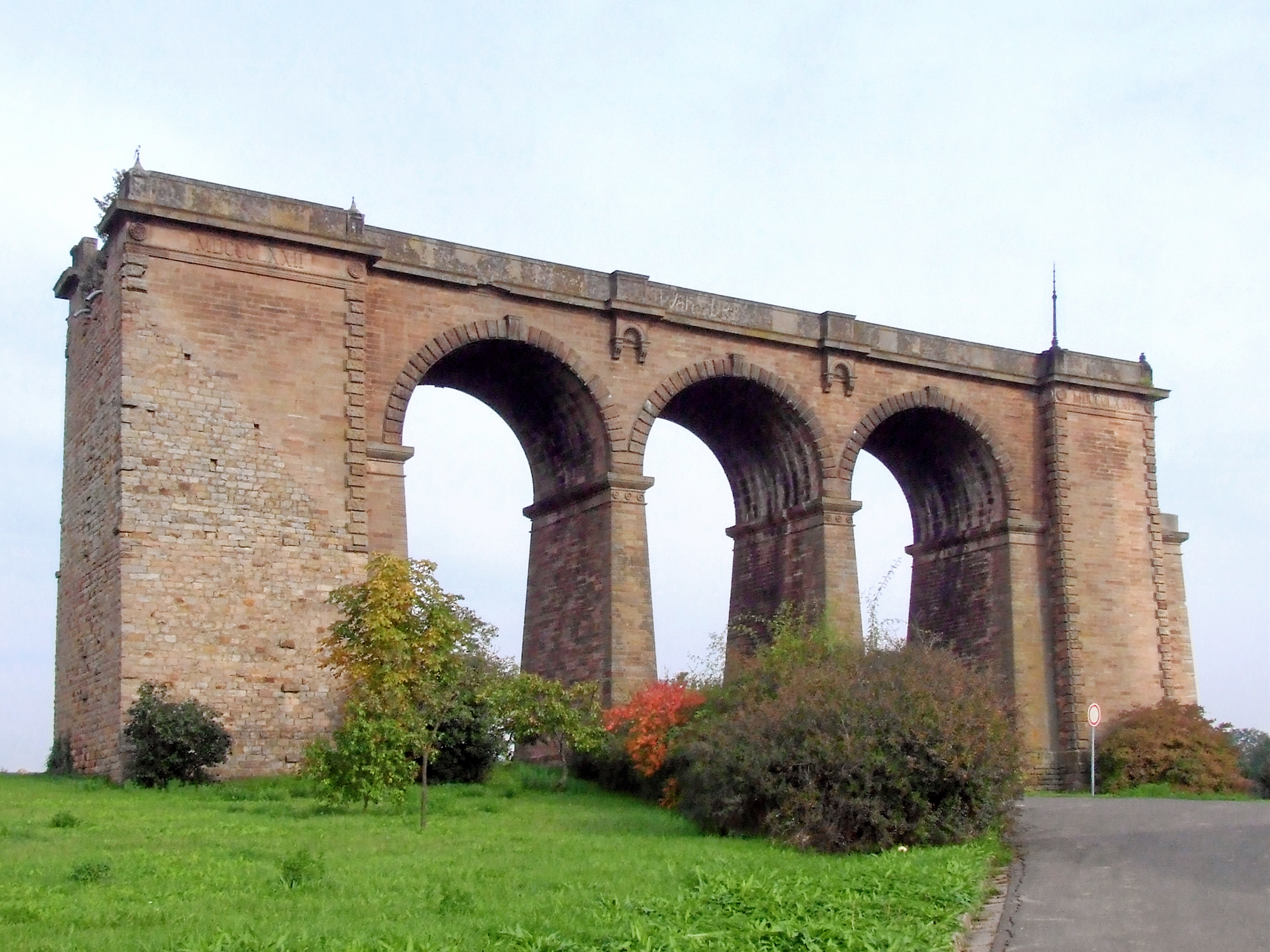
Northern stone arch bridge remains

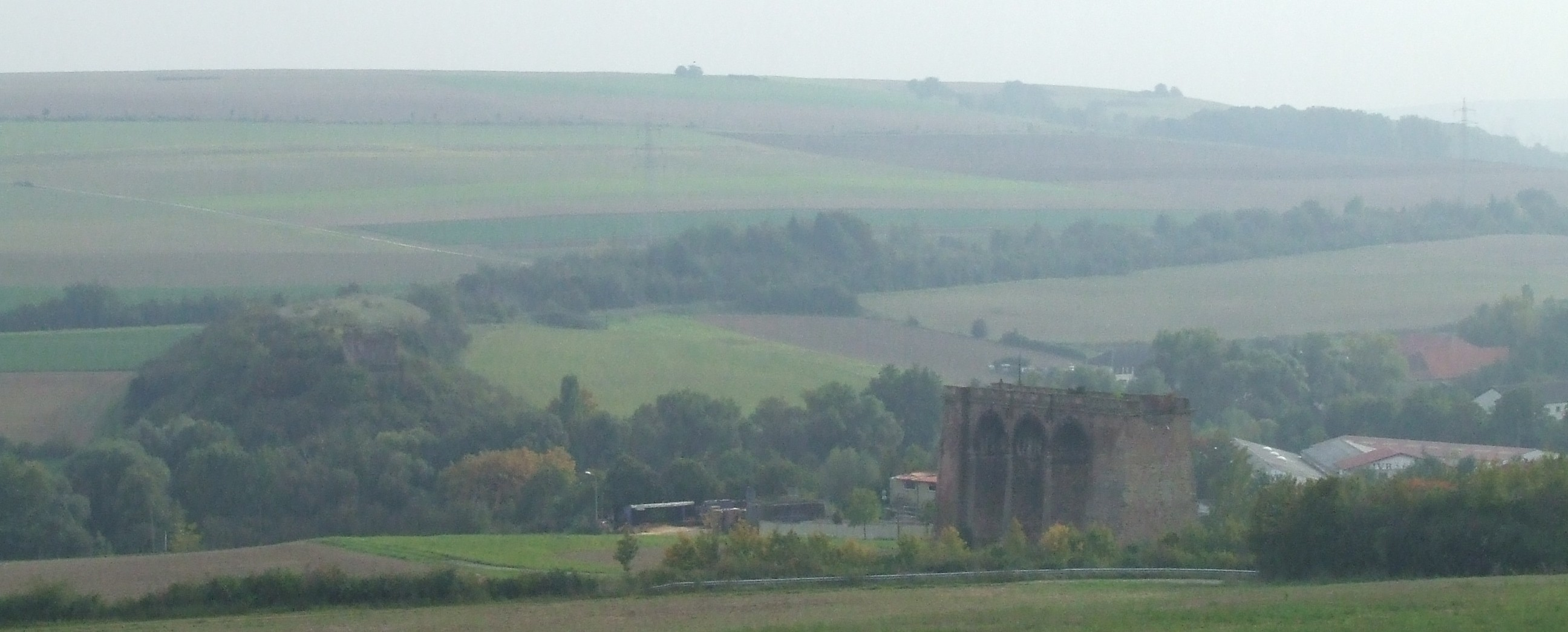
Northern stone arch bridge remains (foreground) and stone pier remains of the southern abutment (left centre); the old railway line is recognisable from the line of trees

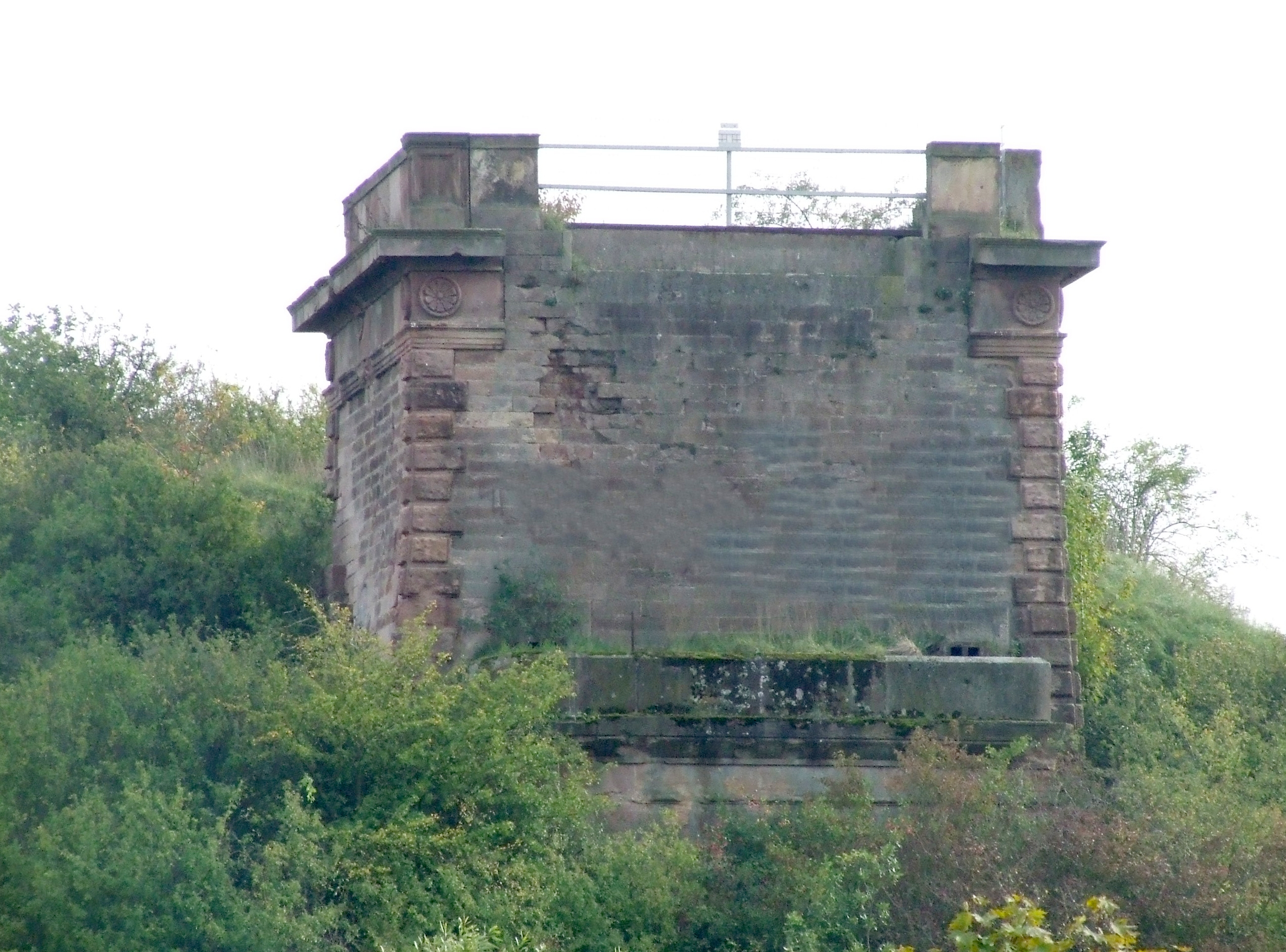
Stone pier remains: southern abutment

The Pfrimm Viaduct (German: Pfrimmtalviadukt), colloquially also called the Marnheim Bridge (Marnheimer Brücke), was a railway bridge near Marnheim in the county of Donnersbergkreis in the German state of Rhineland-Palatinate. It was built as a stone arch and truss bridge from 1872 to 1874, was 260 metres long and 30 metres high, and carried the Donnersberg Railway from Hungerberg over the valley of the Pfrimm to the Zeller Valley Railway, which is only open at weekends today. The bridge is a protected monument and forms the "Gateway to the Zellertal" (Tor zum Zellertal).

== Location ==
The viaduct was built east of Marnheim. The remains of its northern stone arch bridge are located on the northeastern edge of the village at about 193 m above sea level (NHN). It is 45 metres south of the B 47 and 200 metres north of the confluence of the Goldbrunnengraben (Goldbrunnenbächlein) and the Rhine tributary, the Pfrimm, and carries a field track. About 240 metres south-southeast of the centre of the northern part of the bridge at a height of about 200 m near the south bank of the Pfrimm are stone pier remains of the southern abutment.

== History and description ==
The Pfrimm Viaduct was built as a 260-metre-long and 30-metre-high stone arch and truss bridge with a superstructure of lattice and steel girder design between the years 1872 and 1874. Its bridge piers were built on post foundations.

On 20 March 1945, Shortly before the end of the Second World War the bridge was blown up by withdrawing Wehrmacht troops. The link to Mainz via Alzey was thus cut. After the war there were attempts to rebuild the viaduct, but they foundered – as did a new route without a viaduct – due to the cost. In addition the railway had transferred services to buses.

Since the construction of the B 47 north of the viaduct, when the adjoining railway embankment (in the upper photograph the formerly covered stones are still visible during related work) was removed, the northern bridge remains have stood isolated in the open.
