= Mörstadt =

- Municipality
- Coat of arms

- Location of Mörstadt within Alzey-Worms district
- Interactive map of Mörstadt
- Location within Germany Location within Rhineland-Palatinate
- Coordinates: 49°39′43″N 8°15′17″E
- Country: Germany
- State: Rhineland-Palatinate
- District: Alzey-Worms
- Municipal assoc.: Monsheim

Government
  - Mayor (2019–24): Stephan Hammer

Area
  - Total: 5.62 km^{2} (2.17 sq mi)
- Elevation: 125 m (410 ft)

Population (2025-12-31)
  - Total: 1,029
  - Density: 183/km^{2} (474/sq mi)
- Time zone: UTC+01:00 (CET)
  - Summer (DST): UTC+02:00 (CEST)
- Postal codes: 67591
- Dialling codes: 06247
- Vehicle registration: AZ
- Website: www.moerstadt.de

Mörstadt is an Ortsgemeinde – a municipality belonging to a Verbandsgemeinde, a kind of collective municipality – in the Alzey-Worms district in Rhineland-Palatinate, Germany.

== Geography ==
=== Location ===
The municipality lies in Rhenish Hesse and is a winegrowing centre. It belongs to the Verbandsgemeinde of Monsheim, whose seat is in the like-named municipality.

== Politics ==
=== Municipal council ===
The council is made up of 12 council members, who were elected at the municipal election held on 7 June 2009, and the honorary mayor as chairman.

The municipal election held on 7 June 2009 yielded the following results:

	SPD	FWG	Röder	Total
2009	7	3	2	12 seats

=== Mayors ===
- Gerd Ermarth - FWG (1979–1999)
- Horst Wendel - SPD (1999–2019)
- Stephan Hammer - FWG (since 2019)

=== Coat of arms ===
The municipality's arms might be described thus: Azure in chief two mullets Or, in base a daisy argent seeded of the second.

== Culture and sightseeing ==
=== Buildings ===
- Village church from 1670 with a Stumm organ

=== Theatre ===
- Since 2005, Mörstadt has had at its disposal a lakeside stage on the Woog (a local word for “pond”).

== Famous people ==
- Amalie Haizinger, actress was born here in 1800

=== Honorary citizens ===
- Gerd Ermarth
- Horst Wendel
