= Hohen-Sülzen =

- Municipality
- Coat of arms

- Location of Hohen-Sülzen within Alzey-Worms district
- Interactive map of Hohen-Sülzen
- Location within Germany Location within Rhineland-Palatinate
- Coordinates: 49°37′09″N 8°13′32″E
- Country: Germany
- State: Rhineland-Palatinate
- District: Alzey-Worms
- Municipal assoc.: Monsheim

Government
  - Mayor (2019–24): Andreas Thon (SPD)

Area
  - Total: 3.78 km^{2} (1.46 sq mi)
- Elevation: 153 m (502 ft)

Population (2025-12-31)
  - Total: 732
  - Density: 194/km^{2} (502/sq mi)
- Time zone: UTC+01:00 (CET)
  - Summer (DST): UTC+02:00 (CEST)
- Postal codes: 67591
- Dialling codes: 06243
- Vehicle registration: AZ
- Website: www.hohen-suelzen.de

Hohen-Sülzen is an Ortsgemeinde – a municipality belonging to a Verbandsgemeinde, a kind of collective municipality – in the Alzey-Worms district in Rhineland-Palatinate, Germany.

== Geography ==
=== Location ===
The municipality lies in Rhenish Hesse. The winegrowing centre belongs to the Verbandsgemeinde of Monsheim, whose seat is in the like-named municipality.

== History ==
In 1869, a Dionysus bottle from the third century was unearthed in Hohen-Sülzen. The bottle is 42 cm tall and has figures ground into it. The image was cut into the glass's outside surface in vividly effective deep grinding. The figures’ effect was further strengthened by engraving individual body parts. The scene with several figures stems from the wine god Dionysus's milieu. The bottle has been ascribed to the same workshop that made the Lynceus beaker in the Romano-Germanic Museum. This glass was found together with a cage cup, which has been lost since the Second World War. The Hohen-Sülzen bottle now stands as the centrepiece of the Roman glass collection at the Landesmuseum Mainz (Inventar Nr. R 6111).

== Politics ==
=== Municipal council ===
The council is made up of 12 council members, who were elected at the municipal election held on 7 June 2009, and the honorary mayor as chairman.

The municipal election held on 7 June 2009 yielded the following results:

	SPD	FDP	FWG	Total
2009	4	1	7	12 seats
2004	4	1	7	12 seats
1999	4	1	7	12 seats
1994	5	-	7	12 seats
1989	5	-	6	11 seats

=== Mayors ===
- 1994–2004: Günther Maurer (FWG)
- 2004–2019: Kurt Görisch (FWG)
- since 2019: Andreas Thon (SPD)

=== Coat of arms ===
The municipality's arms might be described thus: Per pale azure a wheel spoked of six argent, and gules nine lozenges conjoined Or, three, three and three, in a chief of the fourth a bunch of grapes flanked by two grape leaves issuant from the top thereof, all vert.

== Economy and infrastructure ==
Hohen-Sülzen is characterized by the winegrowing found throughout Rhenish Hesse. The VDP winery Weingut Battenfeld Spanier is located here. Within the Domblick winemaking appellation – Weingroßlage – in the Wonnegau are the Sonnenberg and Kirchenstück wineries.
