= Ernst-Albrecht Hildebrandt =

SS and Police Leader and SS-Oberführer (1895–1970)

- Born: 31 May 1895; Offstein, Grand Duchy of Hesse, German Empire
- Died: 28 March 1970 (aged 74); Nuremberg, West Germany
- Military career
- Allegiance: German Empire; Weimar Republic; Nazi Germany
- Branch: Imperial German Army; Reichswehr; Schutzstaffel; Waffen-SS
- Service years: 1914–1920; 1932–1945
- Rank: Oberleutnant; SS-Oberführer
- Commands: Police President, Hof; Dessau; SS and Police Leader, "Oberitalien-Mitte"
- Conflicts: World War I World War II
- Awards: Iron Cross, 1st and 2nd class Clasp to the Iron Cross, 2nd class Wound Badge, in black

Ernst-Albrecht Hildebrandt (31 May 1895 – 28 March 1970) was a Nazi German Police President and SS-Oberführer. During the Second World War, he was also an officer with the Waffen-SS and served as the SS and Police Leader (SSPF) in "Oberitalien-Mitte" (Central Upper Italy).

== Early life ==
Hildebrandt was born in Offstein, the son of a ceramics factory director who also served for a time as the town mayor. He was the older brother of Richard Hildebrandt, who became an SS-Obergruppenführer and was executed in Poland as a war criminal in 1951.

After graduating from the gymnasium in Dorsten, Hildebrandt passed his abitur and, on the outbreak of the First World War in August 1914, joined the Imperial German Army's 117th (3rd Grand Ducal Hessian) Life Infantry Regiment "Grand Duchess." Commissioned a Leutnant with the 56th (7th Westphalian) Infantry Regiment "Vogel von Falkenstein" in May 1915, he served in combat on the western front. He was awarded the Iron Cross, 2nd class and the Wound Badge, in black. From February 1917 to November 1919 he was a British prisoner of war. Formally discharged from the Reichswehr on 31 March 1920 with the rank of Oberleutnant, he studied economics for two semesters at Goethe University in Frankfurt. He served briefly in the Freikorps from 1922 to 1923. He was also active in 1923 in the Viking League, a paramilitary organization committed to the overthrow of the Weimar Republic. He belonged to the Nazi Party from 1922 until November 1923 when it was banned in the wake of the failed Beer Hall Putsch. At that time he was serving as an SA battalion adjutant in Coburg. He was employed until 1925 as a commercial clerk, then until 1928 as an auditor at the Mosaic and Wall Panel Association in Berlin and then as a self-employed tradesman until 1931.

== Peacetime SS career ==
On 1 February 1932, Hildebrandt joined the SS (SS number 25,517). He was commissioned an SS-Sturmführer on 2 April of that year and promoted to SS-Hauptsturmführer on 15 November. After the Nazi seizure of power, he rejoined the Nazi Party on 1 April 1933 (member number 1,664,468). He began his career as an intelligence officer with the SD from March to May 1933 in SS-Gruppe "Süd" in Munich, the headquarters of the Party. He was then made commander of the SD detachment in that jurisdiction (renamed SS-Oberabschnitt (Main District) "Süd" in November 1933) and served in that capacity until April 1934. At that point, he was made a special duties officer on the staffs of the 15th SS-Standarte in Altona, and then the 75th SS-Standarte in Berlin; these assignments ran from April 1934 until April 1937. He was then promoted to SS-Sturmbannführer and returned to his SD command in Munich from 20 April to 10 August 1937. Hildebrandt's next posting was as the Police President in Hof, where he attained the rank of SS-Obersturmbannführer in November 1938 and remained until July 1940. From 6 July 1940 until the fall of the Nazi regime, Hildebrandt was the Police President of Dessau, though others acted in his place during his long wartime absence.

== Second World War ==
On 21 June 1942, Hildebrandt joined the Waffen-SS as an Obersturmführer of reserves and was assigned until September 1942 to the eponymous Kampfgruppe (Battle Group) "Jeckeln" under SS-Obergruppenführer Friedrich Jeckeln, then the Higher SS and Police Leader (HSSPF) in "Rußland-Nord" (Northern Russia). Hildebrandt next was deployed to the notorious 7th SS Volunteer Mountain Division Prinz Eugen, then engaged in counterinsurgency campaigns against Yugoslav partisans in which many war crimes against civilians took place. He served as a company commander until June 1943, and as the divisional adjutant from June to 23 August 1943. Following that, he was attached to the staff of the HSSPF "Rußland-Süd" (Southern Russia), SS-Obergruppenführer Hans-Adolf Prützmann, for police training in preparation for his next assignment.

On 20 April 1944, Hildebrandt was promoted to SS-Oberführer and named SS and Police Leader in "Oberitalien-Mitte" (Central Upper Italy) with his headquarters in Bologna and, later, Desenzano del Garda. He was the only holder of this post and reported directly to the Supreme SS and Police Leader (HöSSPF) in Italy, SS-Obergruppenführer Karl Wolff. In this new position, Hildebrandt commanded all SS personnel and police in his jurisdiction, including not only the SD, but the Ordnungspolizei (Orpo; regular uniformed police) and the SiPo (security police), which included the Gestapo (secret police). The Italian authorities generally had not cooperated in the deportation of Jews from the areas they controlled, but this changed after the fall of the Mussolini regime and the occupation of most of Italy by German forces. The SS and police forces began mass arrests and deportation of Jews, mainly to the Auschwitz extermination camp. It is estimated that over 8,500 were deported from the formerly Italian-controlled areas, and most perished.

After his Italian posting ended in October 1944, Hildebrandt served until February 1945 as a special duties officer to the HSSPF "Südost," SS-Obergruppenführer Ernst-Heinrich Schmauser in Breslau (today, Wrocław). His last assignment was in Düsseldorf as a special duties officer to the HSSPF "West," SS-Obergruppenführer Karl Gutenberger, in which post he served until the end of the war in Europe in May 1945. Not much is known of his post-war life, and he died in Nuremberg on 28 March 1970.

== SS ranks ==
SS ranks
Rank	Date
SS-Sturmführer	2 April 1932
SS-Hauptsturmführer	15 November 1932
SS-Sturmbannführer	20 April 1937
SS-Obersturmbannführer	9 November 1938
SS-Standartenführer	30 January 1941
Obersturmführer (Waffen-SS)	21 June 1942
Hauptsturmführer (Waffen-SS)	30 January 1943
SS-Oberführer	20 April 1944

== See also ==
- The Holocaust in Italy

== Sources ==
- Schiffer Publishing Ltd., ed. (2000). SS Officers List: SS-Standartenführer to SS-Oberstgruppenführer (As of 30 January 1942). Schiffer Military History Publishing. ISBN 0-7643-1061-5.
- Williams, Max (2015). SS Elite: The Senior Leaders of Hitler's Praetorian Guard. Vol. 1. Fonthill Media LLC. ISBN 978-1-781-55433-3.
- Yerger, Mark C. (1997). Allgemeine-SS: The Commands, Units and Leaders of the General SS. Schiffer Publishing Ltd. ISBN 0-7643-0145-4.
