= Pfrimm =

River in Germany

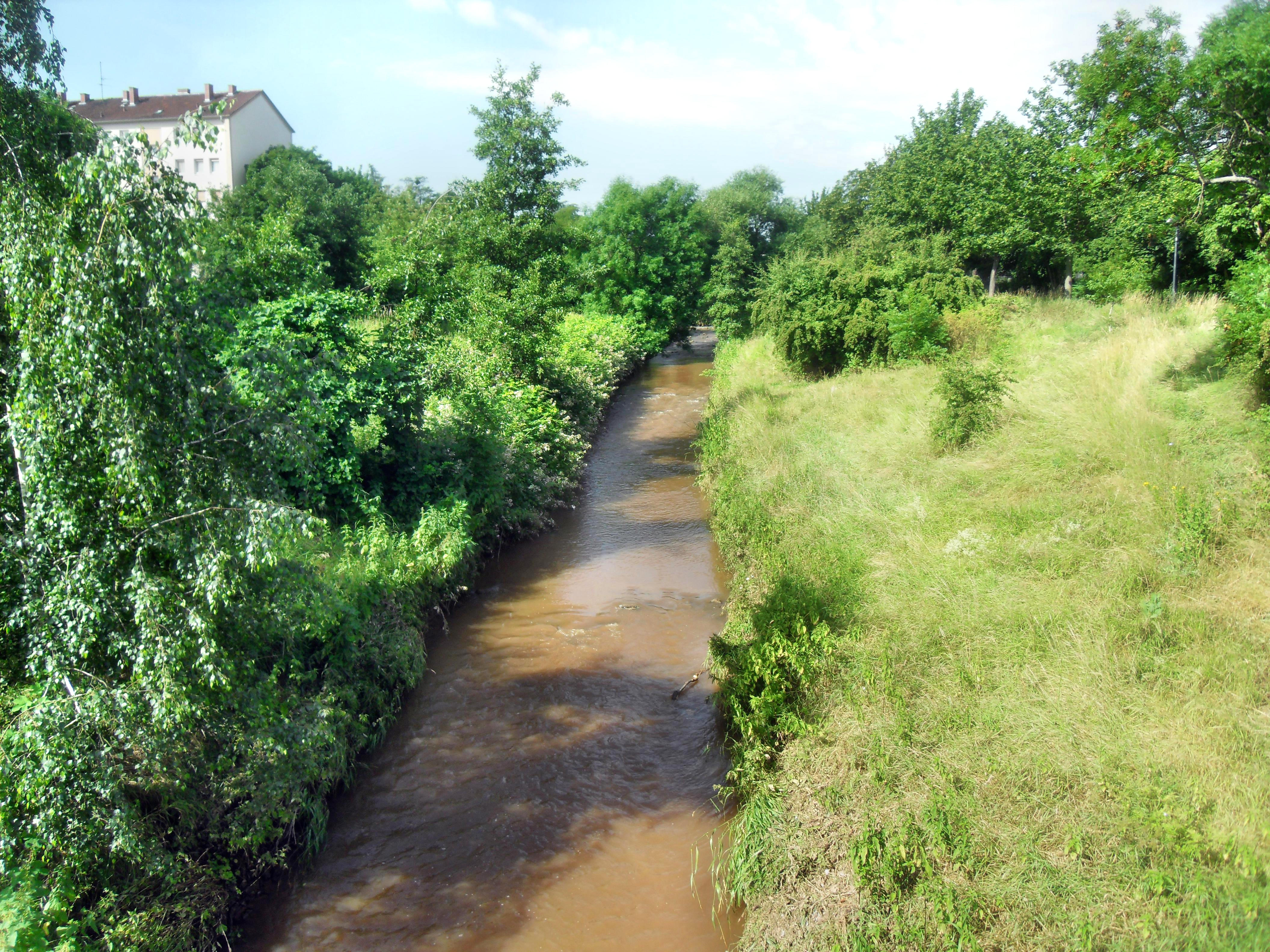
- The Pfrimm in Worms

Location
- Country: Germany
- State: Rhineland-Palatinate

Physical characteristics
- Source
  - location: Southeast of Sippersfeld in the Protected Area Sippersfelder Weiher
  - coordinates: 49°32′25″N 7°57′25″E
  - elevation: 300 m (980 ft)
- Mouth
  - location: Confluence with Rhine in Worms,
  - coordinates: 49°39′38.9″N 8°21′57.3″E
  - elevation: 89 m (292 ft)
- Length: 42.7 km (26.5 mi)
- Basin size: 246.383 km^{2} (95.129 sq mi)

Basin features
- Progression: Rhine→ North Sea
- Tributaries
  - left: Bornbach, Häferbach, Gerbach, Leiselsbach
  - right: Mohbach, Ammelbach, Kinderbach

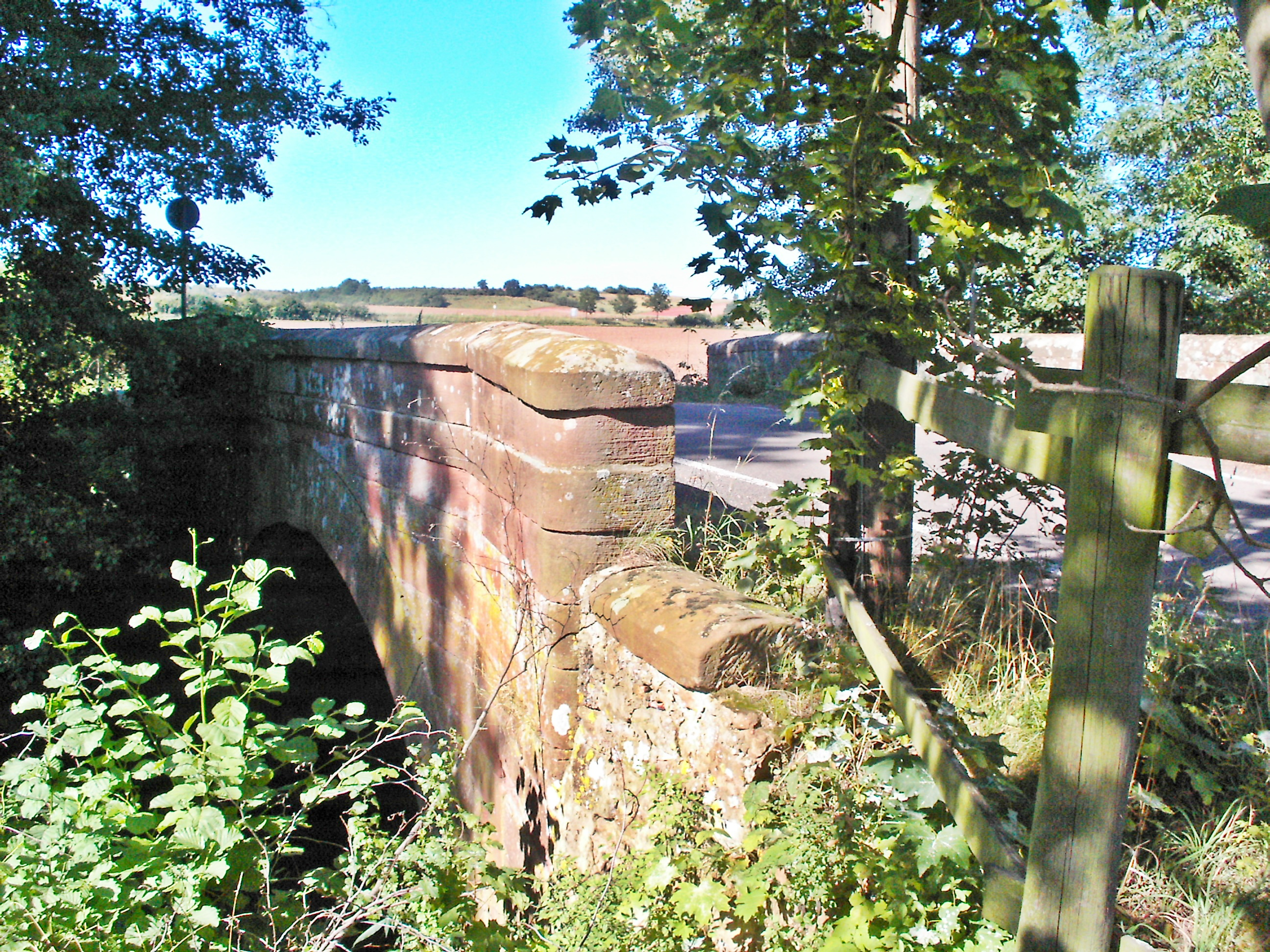
Pfrimm bridge dating back to 1770 at Münsterhof near Dreisen

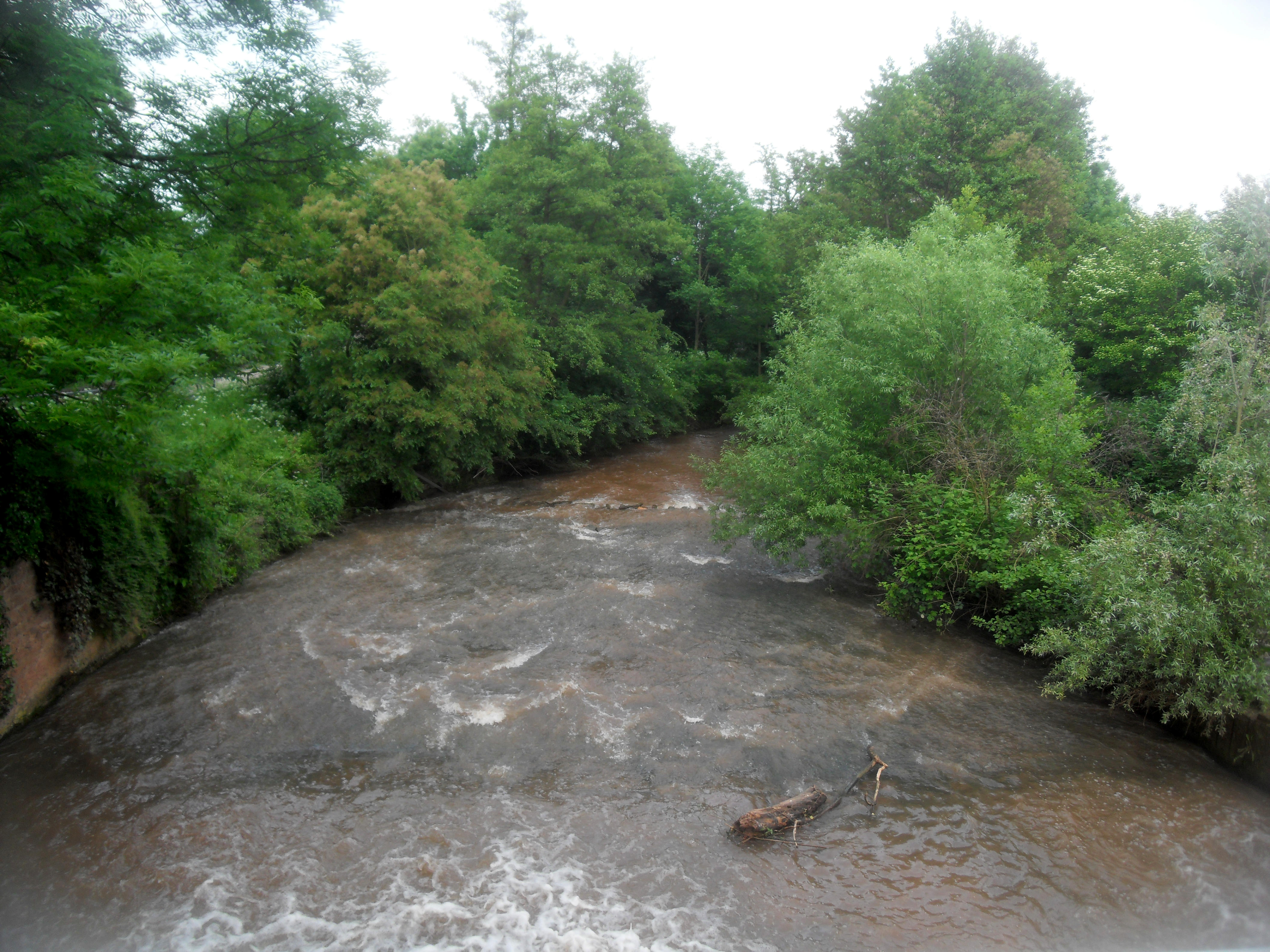
The Pfrimm in the Karl Bittel Park in Worms

The Pfrimm (German pronunciation: [pfʁɪm]) is a 42.7-kilometre-long (26.5 mi), left or western tributary of the Rhine in the Rhineland-Palatinate, Germany.

== Course ==
The Pfrimm rises in the southern part of the Donnersbergkreis. Its spring lies in the northern part of the Palatinate Forest Nature Park, about 3 kilometres (2 mi) southeast of the municipality Sippersfeld in the protected area Sippersfelder Weiher, which contains several ponds in the Hinterwald area. The spring is in a valley surrounded by the hills Sperberhöhe (329 m above sea level (NN)) in the east, Salweidenkopf (354 m above NN) in the south and Schnepfberg (361 m above NN) in the southwest. In 1927, the spring was encased in basalt stones. About 10 metres (33 ft) north of the spring, the Pfrimm river flows through a pond named Pfrimmweiher and subsequently through a pond named Sippersfelder Weiher. It does not flow thought the nearby pond Retzbergweiher, which lies nearby to the west.

The Pfrimm flows primarily through agricultural areas, and mostly about parallel to the federal road B47. The upper part of the river drains the northern parts of the North Palatine Uplands. Below the Sippersfelder Weiher, it flows to the north, past Pfrimmerhof, which belongs to the municipality of Sippersfeld, then west past the hill Pfrimmer Berg and through the village of Breunigweiler, where the Mohbach joins from the southeast.

After entering the Alzey Hills, the Pfrimm takes up the Bornbach and then flows northeastward past Standenbühl, while the Donnersberg mountains are a few kilometers further northeast. Between Standenbühl and Dreisen, the Münsterhof, the former Premonstratensian abbey Münsterdreisen, is situated on the Pfrimm's southern shore. An old bulging sandstone bridge from 1770 spans the river at this point. Below Dreisen, the Häferbach joins from the west. In Marnheim, the Gerbach joins, also from the west; at this point the Pfrimm Viaduct used to span the river, until it was demolished in 1945. From here, the Pfrimm flows past Albisheim, then the Leiselsbach joins from the northwest. It then flows east to Harxheim, where the Ammelbach joins from the south.

The Pfrimm continues flowing east, into the Landkreis Alzey-Worms and thereby into Rhenish Hesse. It flows via Wachenheim to Monsheim, where it crosses under federal road B121. The section between Marnheim and Monsheim is known as the Zellertal valley. Within the municipality Monsheim, the Pfrimm largely forms the boundary between the wards Monsheim and Kriegsheim.

The Pfrimm then reaches the urban district of Worms. It flows through the western ward of Pfeddersheim, where in 1525 the Battle of Pfeddersheim took place. To the west of the village, we find the recreational area Wiesenbrünnchen and the first of two so-called ox pianos (river crossings, see below). The Pfrimm then crosses under the 30-metre (98 ft) high and 1,471.4-metre (4,827 ft) long bridge Talbrücke Pfeddersheim of the Autobahn A61.

The Pfrimm then flows through the city of Worms itself. This is the most straightened and canalized section of the river. It follows the Leiselheimer Damm (also known as the Pfrimmdamm), which was constructed in the Middle Ages and raised in 1841 as part of a Pfrimm improvement project. A footpath runs on top of the dam alongside the river since 1890. The Pfrimm flows through the 300-metre (980 ft) long Pfrimmweiher pond and into the Karl-Bittel-Park (also known as Pfrimmpark), where the other "ox piano" can be found.

The Pfrimm then flows through the city center of Worms and turns north-northeast. It crosses under the federal highway B9 and the Worms Port Railway. About 3 kilometres (2 mi) north of the city center, it flows into the Upper Rhine at Rhine kilometer 446.7. The Rhine also forms the Worms city limit and the boundary between the states of Rhineland-Palatinate and Hesse.

== Discharge ==
In some years, the Pfrimm causes major flooding, for example in 1882, 1892, 1902, 1940, 1950, 1978, 1995 and 2003. A particularly high flood occurred on 27 November 1882, when all the mills along the river were flooded and the fields along the river were transformed into a series of lakes. The water flowed into Gaustraße street in the district of Neuhausen, north of the Worms Central Station. The water flowed into the Rhine near the Liebfrauenkirche Church.

== Ox pianos ==
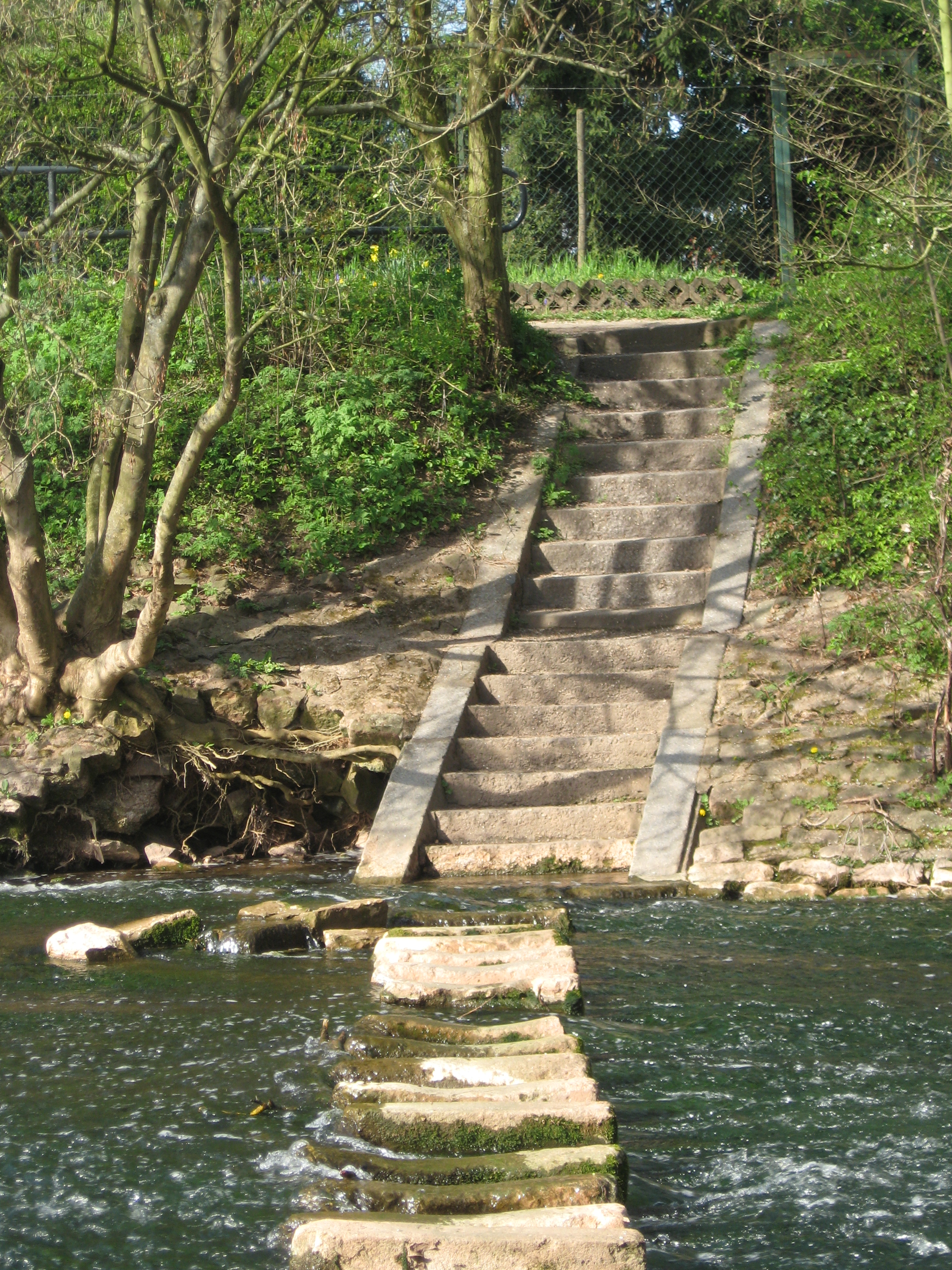
"Ox piano" between Pfiffligheim and Hochheim

=== Between Pfiffligheim and Hochheim ===
In the late 19th century, Pfiffligheim and Hochheim were independent municipalities; they are now boroughs of Worms. A weir was constructed across the Pfrimm in the 1890s slightly above the modern Karl-Bittel-Park. Directly below the weir a series of stepping stones was deployed below the weir in 1898. It is a combination of stone stairs leading down to Pfrimm steps and stepping stones lying in the river allowing pedestrians to cross. In the local vernacular it was called an "ox piano": "ox", because Karl Bittel, who constructed it, claimed even an ox would be capable of crossing, and "piano" because the stones were raised above the water like the black keys on a piano.

Later a regular footbridge was built above the weir, so that the ox piano lost its importance. Nevertheless, the stones are still there and when the water level isn't too high, it can still be crossed.

Also, a fish ladder was added, allowing fish to overcome the weir.

=== In Pfeddersheim ===
A much older ox piano could be found in the western part of in Pfeddersheimer, approximately in the middle of the Enzingerstraße. Here, a concrete dam and a weir were used to hold back the water and divert it into the (now abandoned) Mühlbach ("Mill Brook"). Water not needed by the mill was drained using an adjustable weir or, at higher water levels, across the entire width of the concrete barrier. Here, too, and "ox piano" was constructed, allowing pedestrians to cross the Pfrimm with dry feet, if the water level permitted. The Mill Brook was about a meter deep, near the weir even over two meters, and was used by local residents for swimming and diving, as was the waterfall created by the weir.

== Traffic ==
The Pfrimm is classified as a water body of the second category and can only be navigated in a canoe or a kayak.

Many state roads run through the Pfrimm valley and cross the river. The federal road B47 run parallel to the river. At Monsheim, the river passes under B271. The Autobahn A63 accompanies the upper reaches of the Pfrimm from Standenbühl to Marnheim. East of Pfeddersheim, the A61 crosses the river. Near the mouth, the Pfrimm is crossed by the federal highway B9.

The Zeller Valley Railway, a regional branch line, serves the Pfrimm valley.

== See also ==
- List of rivers of Rhineland-Palatinate
