= Flörsheim-Dalsheim =

- Municipality
- Coat of arms

- Location of Flörsheim-Dalsheim within Alzey-Worms district
- Interactive map of Flörsheim-Dalsheim
- Location within Germany Location within Rhineland-Palatinate
- Coordinates: 49°40′32″N 8°12′32″E
- Country: Germany
- State: Rhineland-Palatinate
- District: Alzey-Worms
- Municipal assoc.: Monsheim
- Subdivisions: 2 Ortsteile

Government
  - Mayor (2024–29): Tobias Rohrwick (SPD)

Area
  - Total: 12.71 km^{2} (4.91 sq mi)
- Elevation: 152 m (499 ft)

Population (2025-12-31)
  - Total: 3,223
  - Density: 253.6/km^{2} (656.8/sq mi)
- Time zone: UTC+01:00 (CET)
  - Summer (DST): UTC+02:00 (CEST)
- Postal codes: 67592
- Dialling codes: 06243
- Vehicle registration: AZ
- Website: www.floersheimdalsheim.de

Flörsheim-Dalsheim is an Ortsgemeinde – a municipality belonging to a Verbandsgemeinde, a kind of collective municipality – in the Alzey-Worms district in Rhineland-Palatinate, Germany.

== Geography ==
=== Location ===
The municipality, belonging to the Verbandsgemeinde of Monsheim, whose seat is in the like-named municipality, lies in Rhenish Hesse.

=== Constituent communities ===
The municipality’s Ortsteile are Nieder-Flörsheim and Dalsheim. Dalsheim was earlier known as a Flecken (“market town”), which explains the village wall’s name, Fleckenmauer.

== History ==
The municipality of Flörsheim-Dalsheim came into being on 7 June 1969 through the amalgamation of the municipalities of Dalsheim and Nieder-Flörsheim.

== Politics ==
=== Municipal council ===
The council is made up of 20 council members, who were elected at the municipal election held on 7 June 2009, and the honorary mayor as chairman.

The municipal election held on 7 June 2009 yielded the following results:

	SPD	CDU	FDP	GRÜNE	FWG	Total
2009	7	1	2	1	9	20 seats
2004	8	2	1	1	8	20 seats

=== Mayors ===
- Dr. Kurt Becker (1969–1974)
- Emil Göhring (1974–1989)
- Gerhard Rohrwick (1989–2004)
- Volker Henn (2004–2019)
- Tobias Rohrwick (2019–present)

=== Coat of arms ===
The municipality’s arms might be described thus: Sable in base two inescutcheons in fess leaning against each other, on the dexter gules Saint John with a nimbus, on his dexter arm a lamb argent, on the sinister bendy lozengy sinister argent and azure, upon both inescutcheons a lion passant Or langued and crowned of the second.

== Culture and sightseeing ==
=== Agriculture ===
Flörsheim-Dalsheim is among Rhenish Hesse’s biggest winegrowing centres. Its various vineyards are part of the Großlage (winemaking appellation) of Burg Rodenstein, and are the Dalsheimer Hubacker, the Sauloch, the Steig, the Bürgel, the Goldberg and the Frauenberg.

=== Buildings ===
==== Fleckenmauer ====
The Fleckenmauer – the village wall – girds the constituent community of Dalsheim. It is believed to have been built between 1470 and 1490 and is almost wholly preserved today. Its total length is almost exactly one kilometre. The Upper Gate (Obertor) is reinforced with a round tower, and the Lower Gate (Untertor) with a rectangular one. Until 1833, a watchman and his family lived in the Lower Gate tower, and each night he shut the gates.

The Fleckenmauer was renovated between 1986 and 1990. On this occasion, the first Fleckenmauerfest was held in 1988. Since then, this festival has been held every four years. One part of the wall is accessible by walking and may be visited as part of a tour.

=== Education ===
Flörsheim-Dalsheim has a Hauptschule and an Evangelical kindergarten in the constituent community of Dalsheim and a daycare centre the constituent community of Nieder-Flörsheim.
