= Offstein =

- Municipality
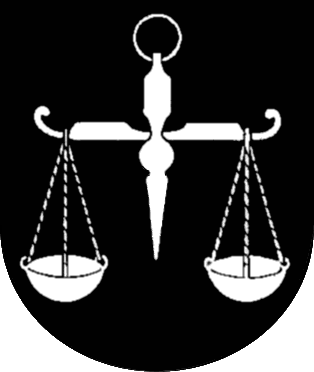
- Coat of arms

- Location of Offstein within Alzey-Worms district
- Interactive map of Offstein
- Location within Germany Location within Rhineland-Palatinate
- Coordinates: 49°36′22″N 8°14′17″E
- Country: Germany
- State: Rhineland-Palatinate
- District: Alzey-Worms
- Municipal assoc.: Monsheim

Government
  - Mayor (2019–24): Andreas Böll (SPD)

Area
  - Total: 5.64 km^{2} (2.18 sq mi)
- Elevation: 118 m (387 ft)

Population (2025-12-31)
  - Total: 1,826
  - Density: 324/km^{2} (839/sq mi)
- Time zone: UTC+01:00 (CET)
  - Summer (DST): UTC+02:00 (CEST)
- Postal codes: 67591
- Dialling codes: 06243
- Vehicle registration: AZ
- Website: www.offstein.de

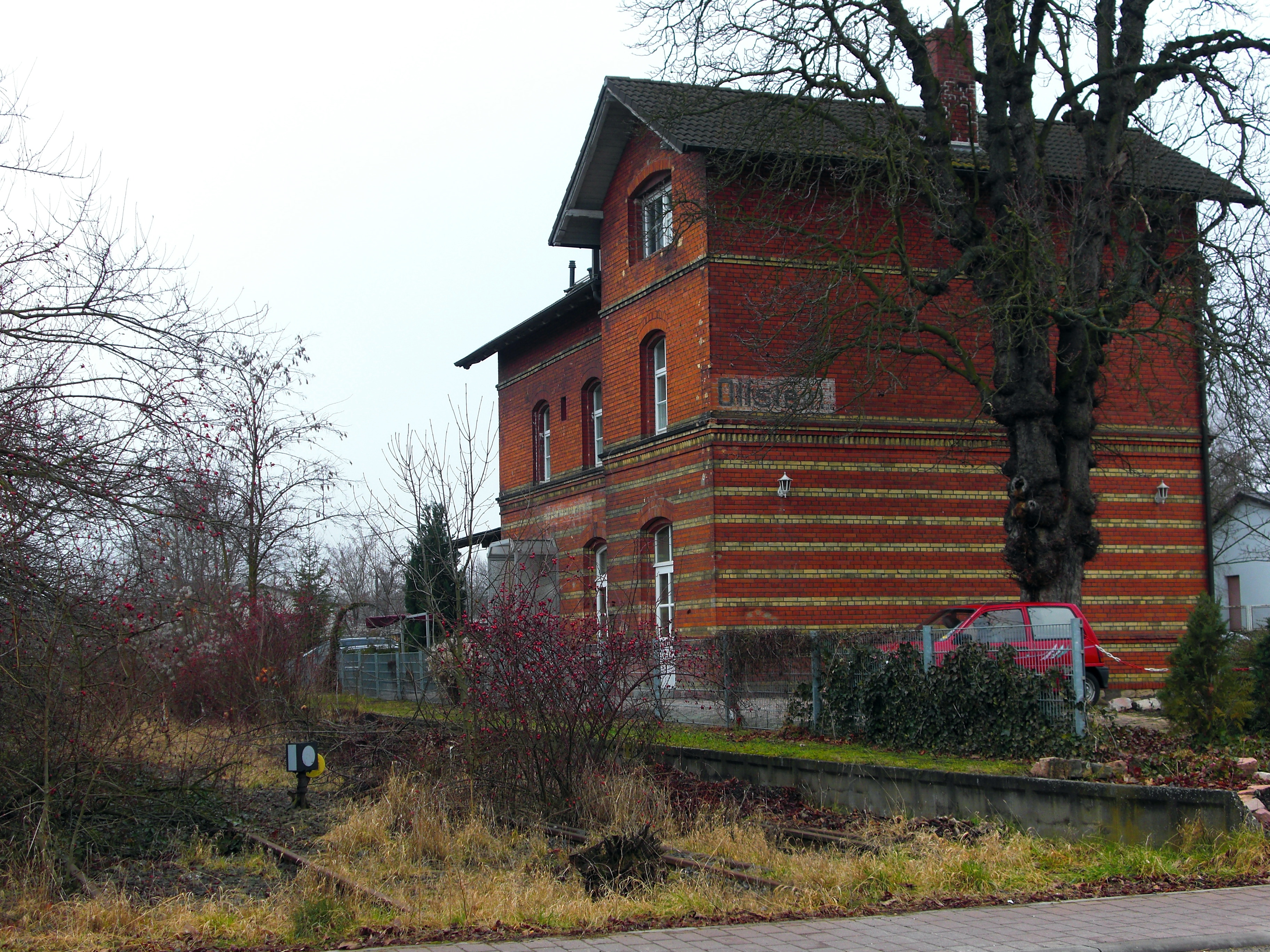
Former Offstein railway station with disused tracks

Offstein (German pronunciation: [ˈɔfʃtaɪn]) is an Ortsgemeinde – a municipality belonging to a Verbandsgemeinde, a kind of collective municipality – in the Alzey-Worms district in Rhineland-Palatinate, Germany.

== Geography ==
The municipality lies in Rhenish Hesse and belongs to the Verbandsgemeinde of Monsheim, whose seat is in the like-named municipality. Geographically speaking, Offstein is located in the western area of the Rhine Rift Valley. The Eisbach, a small tributary situated west of the Rhine, runs through the southern part of the municipality. In terms of the type of settlement, Offstein is a clustered village. The lee of the surrounding low mountain ranges encourages its mild and arid climate. The fertile loess layers in this region render possible a productive agrarian economy.

== Politics ==
=== Municipal council ===
The council is made up of 16 council members, who were elected at the municipal election held on 7 June 2009, and the honorary mayor as chairman.

The municipal election held on 7 June 2009 yielded the following results:

	SPD	GfO	FWG	Total
2009	7	-	9	16 seats
2004	6	6	4	16 seats
1999	6	7	3	16 seats

=== Mayors ===
- 1975–1994 Otto Bergner (SPD)
- 1994–2018: Robert Kuhn (independent)
- 2019–present: Andreas Böll (SPD)

== Economy and infrastructure ==
In the neighbouring hamlet of Neuoffstein, which belongs to Obrigheim, is found the Südzucker-Werk Offstein, a sugar factory and Offstein's most important employer.

== Famous people ==
=== Sons and daughters of the town ===
- Ernst Walter Görisch, Landrat of Alzey-Worms district.
