= Sippersfeld =

- Municipality
- Coat of arms

- Location of Sippersfeld within Donnersbergkreis district
- Interactive map of Sippersfeld
- Location within Germany Location within Rhineland-Palatinate
- Coordinates: 49°33′14.58″N 7°56′3.59″E
- Country: Germany
- State: Rhineland-Palatinate
- District: Donnersbergkreis
- Municipal assoc.: Winnweiler

Government
  - Mayor (2019–24): Martina Lummel-Deutschle

Area
  - Total: 13.23 km^{2} (5.11 sq mi)
- Elevation: 302 m (991 ft)

Population (2025-12-31)
  - Total: 1,086
  - Density: 82.09/km^{2} (212.6/sq mi)
- Time zone: UTC+01:00 (CET)
  - Summer (DST): UTC+02:00 (CEST)
- Postal codes: 67729
- Dialling codes: 06357
- Vehicle registration: KIB

Sippersfeld is a municipality in the Donnersbergkreis district, in Rhineland-Palatinate, Germany.
