= Hinkelstein culture =

- Geographical range: Europe
- Period: Neolithic
- Dates: circa 5,000 B.C.E. — circa 4,900 B.C.E.
- Major sites: Rhine-Main, Rhenish Hesse
- Preceded by: Linear Pottery culture
- Followed by: Rossen culture

The Hinkelstein culture is a Neolithic archaeological culture situated in Rhine-Main and Rhenish Hesse, Germany. It is a Megalithic culture, part of the wider Linear Pottery horizon, dating to approximately the 50th to 49th century BC.

The culture's name is due to a suggestion of Karl Koehl of Worms (1900). Hinkelstein is the term for menhir in the local Hessian dialect, after a menhir discovered in 1866 in Monsheim. Hinkel is a Hessian term for "chicken"; the Standard German name for menhirs, Hünenstein "giants' stone", having sometimes been jokingly mutated into Hühnerstein "chicken-stone".

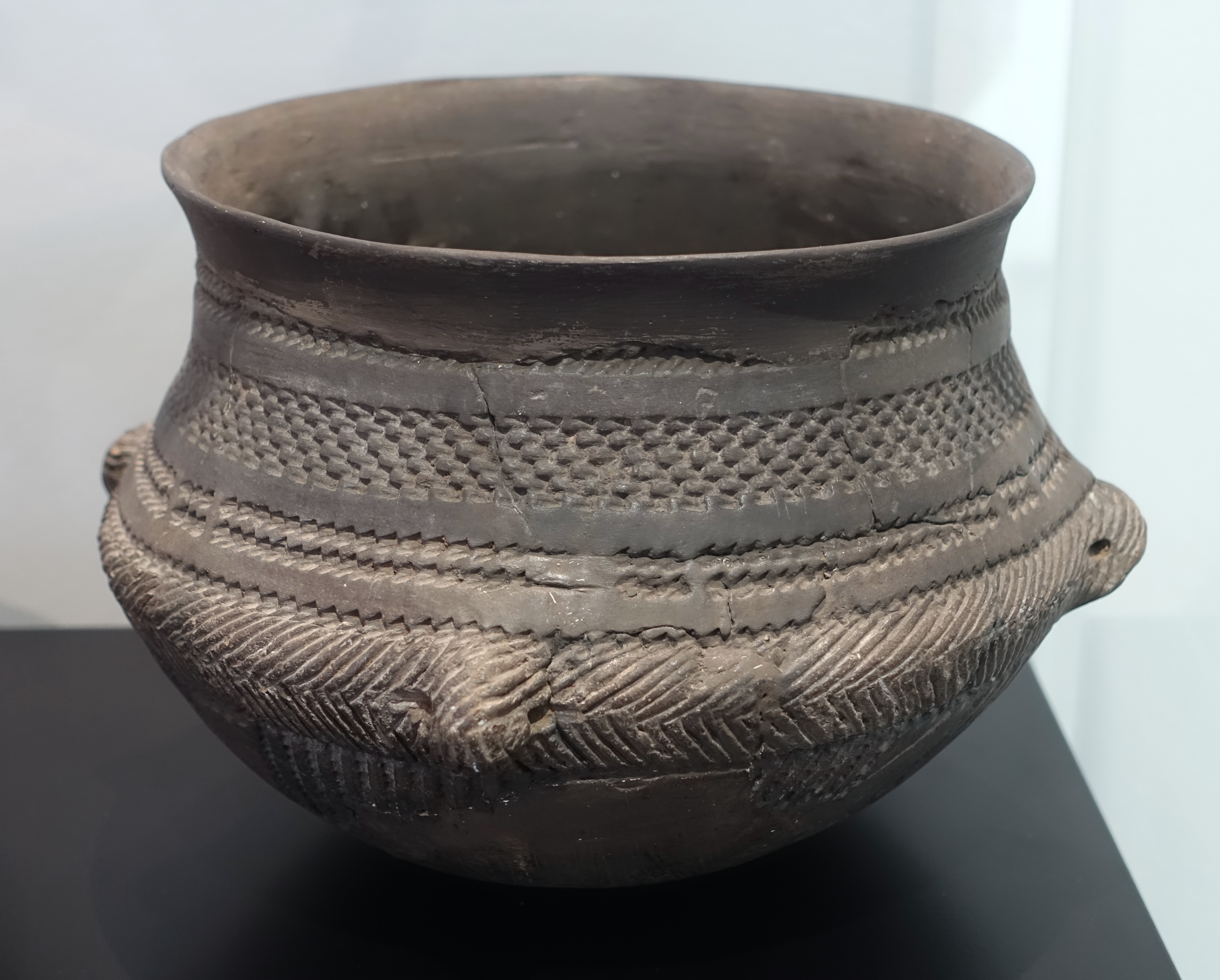
Hinklestein culture pottery

Map of Germany showing important sites that were occupied in the Hinkelstein culture (clickable map).
