= Monsheim (Verbandsgemeinde) =

- Verbandsgemeinde
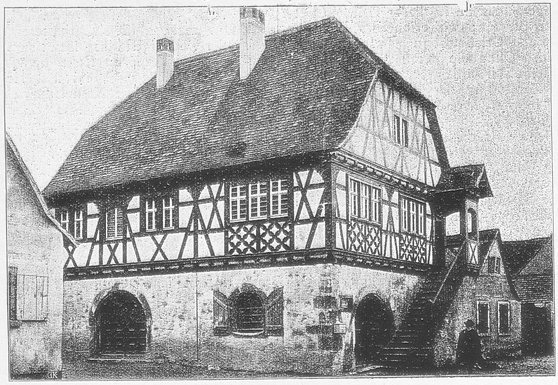
- Town hall of Hohen-Sülzen in 1906

- Location of Monsheim within Alzey-Worms district
- Interactive map of Monsheim
- Location within Germany Location within Rhineland-Palatinate
- Coordinates: 49°38′N 8°13′E
- Country: Germany
- State: Rhineland-Palatinate
- District: Alzey-Worms
- Seat: Monsheim
- Subdivisions: 7 municipalities

Area
  - Total: 45.53 km^{2} (17.58 sq mi)

Population (2025-12-31)
  - Total: 10,420
  - Density: 228.9/km^{2} (592.7/sq mi)
- Time zone: UTC+01:00 (CET)
  - Summer (DST): UTC+02:00 (CEST)
- Website: www.vg-monsheim.de

Monsheim is a Verbandsgemeinde ("collective municipality") in the district Alzey-Worms, Rhineland-Palatinate, Germany. The seat of the Verbandsgemeinde is in Monsheim.

The Verbandsgemeinde Monsheim consists of the following Ortsgemeinden:

1. Flörsheim-Dalsheim
2. Hohen-Sülzen
3. Mölsheim
4. Monsheim
5. Mörstadt
6. Offstein
7. Wachenheim
