= Mölsheim =

- Municipality
- Coat of arms

- Location of Mölsheim within Alzey-Worms district
- Interactive map of Mölsheim
- Location within Germany Location within Rhineland-Palatinate
- Coordinates: 49°38′48″N 8°10′10″E
- Country: Germany
- State: Rhineland-Palatinate
- District: Alzey-Worms
- Municipal assoc.: Monsheim

Government
  - Mayor (2019–24): Sascha Wötzel

Area
  - Total: 4.62 km^{2} (1.78 sq mi)
- Elevation: 197 m (646 ft)

Population (2025-12-31)
  - Total: 543
  - Density: 118/km^{2} (304/sq mi)
- Time zone: UTC+01:00 (CET)
  - Summer (DST): UTC+02:00 (CEST)
- Postal codes: 67591
- Dialling codes: 06243
- Vehicle registration: AZ
- Website: www.moelsheim.de

Mölsheim is an Ortsgemeinde – a municipality belonging to a Verbandsgemeinde, a kind of collective municipality – in the Alzey-Worms district in Rhineland-Palatinate, Germany.

== Geography ==
=== Location ===
The municipality lies in Rhenish Hesse and belongs to the Verbandsgemeinde of Monsheim, whose seat is in the like-named municipality.

== History ==
Near Mölsheim in 1930, the Mölsheim filigree disc fibula from the 7th century was found. This fibula is among the most richly decorated from the era in which it was made. A farmer discovered it while doing clearing work on his vineyard in the Mölsheim municipal area. The Mölsheim golden fibula, as it is also known, is on display at the Hessisches Landesmuseum Darmstadt.

== Politics ==
=== Municipal council ===
The council is made up of 12 council members, who were elected by majority vote proportional representation at the municipal election held on 7 June 2009, and the honorary mayor as chairwoman.

The municipal election held on 7 June 2009 yielded the following results:

	SPD	CDU	FWG	Herz	Total
2009	7	2	1	2	12 seats

=== Mayors ===
- Adolf Weiß (1948–1972)
- ...
- Josef Ehrhard - CDU (1984–1999)
- Helge Wilding - SPD (1999–2014)
- Sascha Wötzel - Ind. (since 2014)

=== Coat of arms ===
The municipality’s arms might be described thus: Per fess, in base per pale argent a cross sable, sable three lions passant sinister Or armed and langued gules, and bendy lozengy argent and azure.

== Culture and sightseeing ==
=== Regular events ===
Once a year in Mölsheim, the kermis (church consecration festival, locally known as the Melsmer Kerb) is held, with celebrating, dancing and drinking, on the first weekend in September. With its good music and Mölsheim wine, the festival is a magnet every year for young and old. Traditionally, the Kerb begins on the Friday with the opening by the kermis youth (Kerwejugend). A highlight every year is the parade on the Sunday at 14:00, which is enjoyed by many visitors from near and far. The Kerb ends on the following Monday evening.

== Economy and infrastructure ==
- Eintrachthalle (“Harmony Hall”)
