= Zeller Valley Railway =

Langmeil (Pfalz)–Monsheim
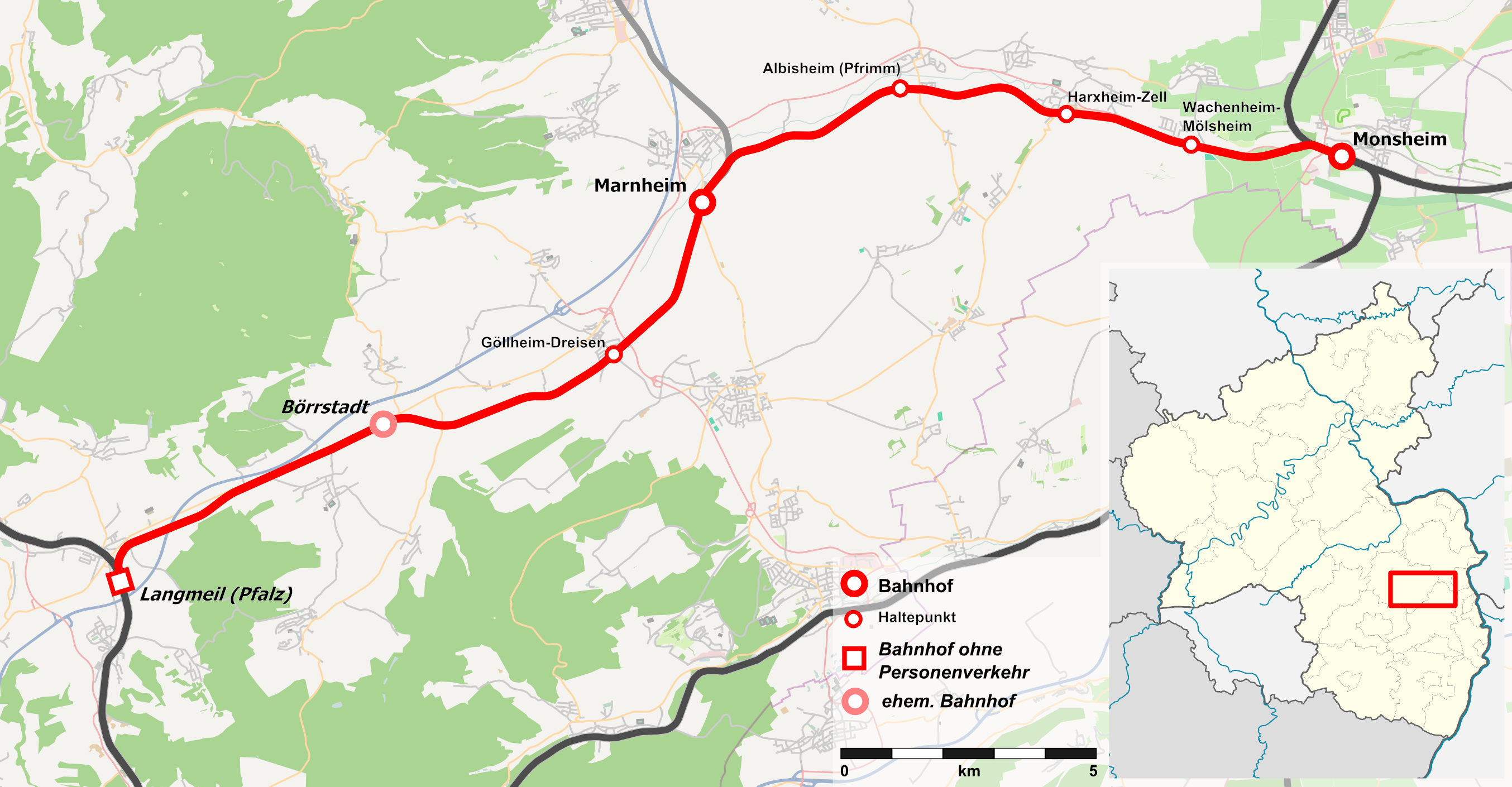

Overview
- Line number: 3322 (Langmeil–Marnheim); 3561 (Marnheim–Monsheim)

Service
- Route number: 662.1

Technical
- Line length: 27.7 km (Line class: D4)
- Track gauge: 1,435 mm

The Zeller Valley Railway (German: Zellertalbahn), also called the Pfrimm Valley Railway (Pfrimmtalbahn), is a branch line from Langmeil to Monsheim. Originally built as a main line and part of the trunk route from Kaiserslautern to Worms, it lost its importance after the Second World War for national traffic. In 1983 passenger services were withdrawn, but, in 2001, it was reactivated on Sundays and holidays. A return to weekday services is currently not likely on cost grounds.

== Literatur ==
- Wolfgang Fiegenbaum, Wolfgang Klee (1997), Abschied von der Schiene. Stillgelegte Bahnstrecken von 1980-1990 (in German), Stuttgart: Transpress Verlag, pp. 212–214, ISBN 3-613-71073-0
- Wolfgang Fiegenbaum, Wolfgang Klee (2002), Rückkehr zur Schiene – Reaktivierte und neue Strecken im Personenverkehr 1980–2001 (in German), Berlin: transpress, p. 137, ISBN 3-613-71185-0
- Klaus D. Holzborn (1993), Eisenbahn-Reviere Pfalz (in German), Berlin: transpress, ISBN 3-344-70790-6
- Heinz Sturm (2005), Die pfälzischen Eisenbahnen (in German), Ludwigshafen am Rhein: pro MESSAGE, ISBN 3-934845-26-6
