= Monsheim =

- Municipality
- Coat of arms

- Location of Monsheim within Alzey-Worms district
- Interactive map of Monsheim
- Location within Germany Location within Rhineland-Palatinate
- Coordinates: 49°38′14″N 8°12′43″E
- Country: Germany
- State: Rhineland-Palatinate
- District: Alzey-Worms
- Municipal assoc.: Monsheim

Government
  - Mayor (2019–24): Kevin Zakostelny (SPD)

Area
  - Total: 9.60 km^{2} (3.71 sq mi)
- Elevation: 143 m (469 ft)

Population (2025-12-31)
  - Total: 2,327
  - Density: 242/km^{2} (628/sq mi)
- Time zone: UTC+01:00 (CET)
  - Summer (DST): UTC+02:00 (CEST)
- Postal codes: 67590
- Dialling codes: 06243
- Vehicle registration: AZ
- Website: www.monsheim.de

Monsheim is an Ortsgemeinde – a municipality belonging to a Verbandsgemeinde, a kind of collective municipality – in the Alzey-Worms district in Rhineland-Palatinate, Germany.

== Geography ==
=== Location ===
Monsheim lies in the southern Wonnegau in Rhenish Hesse on the river Pfrimm, which rises in the southern Donnersbergkreis and empties into the Rhine at Worms, which is roughly 10 km from the municipality. It is also the seat of the Verbandsgemeinde of Monsheim.

== History ==
=== Prehistory ===
The Pfrimm valley has long been settled. In the Monsheim municipal area there have been many archaeological finds. Important are the finds made in the rural area known as Hinkelstein. Here, in 1866, while a field was being cleared to make way for a vineyard, a burial ground was discovered. Originally standing here was a menhir some 2 m tall, known in the local speech as the Hinkelstein; this is now kept in the Monsheim Castle grounds. The discovery was investigated by the Mainz prehistorian Ludwig Lindenschmit the Elder (1809–1893) who described it in 1868. The Worms physician and prehistorian Karl Koehl (1847–1929) put forth the name “Hinkelstein type” as a description for the culture whose artifacts had been unearthed in Monsheim, and today the term “Hinkelstein culture” is customary. This culture existed roughly from 4900 to 4800 BC. It was spread mainly over parts of what are now Baden-Württemberg, Rhineland-Palatinate, and Hesse.

=== Recorded history ===
In the 8th century, Monsheim had its first documentary mention in the Lorsch codex.

Some of the first German settlers in North America, who founded Germantown Township, Pennsylvania in 1683, were from Monsheim's outlying centre of Kriegsheim (then spelled Cresheim). The Cresheim Creek, Cresheim Road, and Cresheim Valley Drive in northwestern Philadelphia are named after the village.

Today’s municipality came into being through the merger on 7 June 1969 of the two formerly separate municipalities of Kriegsheim and Monsheim.

== Politics ==
=== Municipal council ===
The council is made up of 20 council members, who were elected at the municipal election held on 7 June 2009, and the honorary mayor as chairman.

The municipal election held on 9 June 2024 yielded the following results:

	CDU	SPD	FWG	Grüne	LuK	Total
1989	1	7	7			15 seats
1994	1	7	7	1		16 seats
1999	1	8	11			20 seats
2004	2	8	10			20 seats
2009	3	7	10			20 seats
2014	3	6	7			16 seats
2019		11	9			20 seats
2024	5	8	5		2	20 seats

=== Mayors ===
- 1958–1994: Gerd Heinz Schilling (FWG)
- 1994–2019: Michael Röhrenbeck (FWG)
- 2019–present: Kevin Zakostelny (SPD)

=== Coat of arms ===
The municipality's arms might be described thus: Azure an eagle displayed, wings elevated argent, armed gules, in a chief of the third a cross Or.

Monsheim's oldest known seal dates from 1523, but the oldest one still in existence is from 1598. This showed an escutcheon charged with a cross and with the field semé of crosses (that is, strewn with little crosses). The cross came from the arms borne by the Lords of Westerburg, who held the village at that time. The next seal, which is known from 1690, was quarterly (that is, divided into four fields vertically and horizontally) with the eagle in the first and fourth quarters and five crosses each in the other two. The former came from the arms borne by the Counts of Leiningen, and the latter from the Westerburg arms. This new composition was borne by the Counts of Leiningen-Westerburg, as the fiefholders were now called. There was also a supporter in these arms, the local patron saint, Pirmin, who also held a small model of the local church in his free hand. Later seals show either Pirmin or the current armorial composition.

Another coat of arms was proposed in 1956, which might have been described thus: Azure semé of crosses pattée or a church with a tower in sinister charged with a cross pattée of the same, in chief above the nave an eagle displayed, wings elevated argent, armed and langued of the second.

Finally, the arms shown in this article are slightly different from the ones shown in the source (Heraldry of the World). The ones there show the eagle with a red (gules) tongue and claws, but with silver (argent) legs and beak.

The current arms have been borne since 28 December 1957.

Coat of arms of Monsheim

Coat of arms of Kriegsheim

== Culture and sightseeing ==
=== Cultural monuments ===
- Castle: In the 17th century, the old castle was converted into a Renaissance château.
- On the castle grounds is found the “Hinkelstein”, a menhir which may well be from the New Stone Age.

== Economy and infrastructure ==
=== Transport ===
In Monsheim, Bundesstraßen 271 and 47 cross each other. Monsheim station lies on the Rheinhessenbahn (railway), which runs from Bingen am Rhein to Worms. Moreover, the Zellertalbahn begins in Monsheim, running to Langmeil, an outlying centre of Winnweiler, on which excursion trains go to Hochspeyer in the summer. The Pfälzische Nordbahn also begins in Monsheim. On summertime weekends and holidays, journeys on the Elsass-Express ("Alsace Express") to Wissembourg are possible. There is also a bus route beginning in Monsheim, number 921, that goes to Kirchheimbolanden.

=== Education ===
- Heinrich-von-Gagern-Grundschule (primary school)

== Famous people ==
- David Möllinger (1709–1786), German agrarian reformer
- Ernst von Gagern (1807-1865), important priest in the Diocese of Speyer.
