= Albisheim =

- Municipality
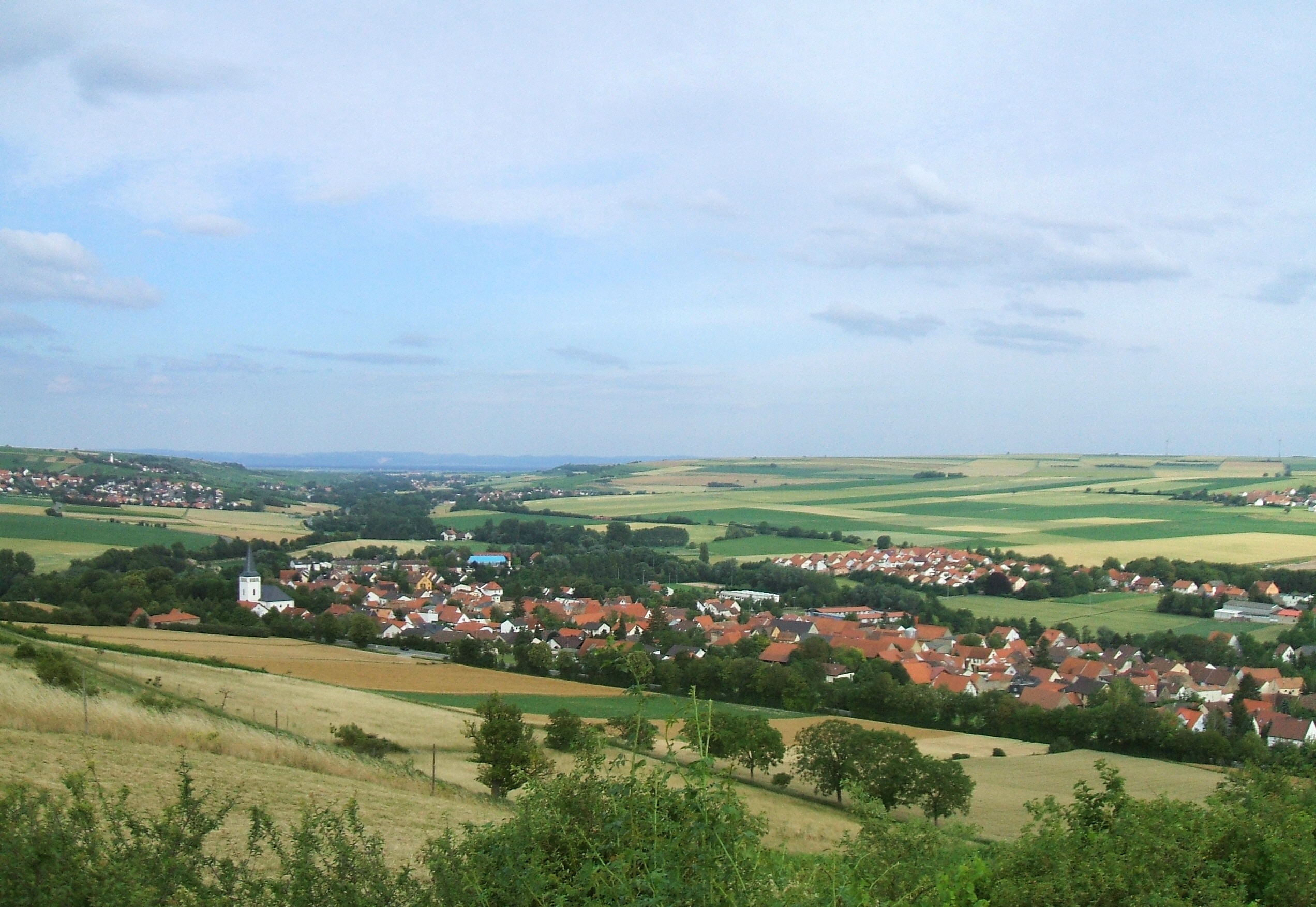

- Coat of arms

- Location of Albisheim within Donnersbergkreis district
- Interactive map of Albisheim
- Location within Germany Location within Rhineland-Palatinate
- Coordinates: 49°39′00″N 8°6′00″E
- Country: Germany
- State: Rhineland-Palatinate
- District: Donnersbergkreis
- Municipal assoc.: Göllheim

Government
  - Mayor (2019–24): Ronald Zelt

Area
  - Total: 10.74 km^{2} (4.15 sq mi)
- Elevation: 150–170 m (490–560 ft)

Population (2025-12-31)
  - Total: 1,841
  - Density: 171.4/km^{2} (444.0/sq mi)
- Time zone: UTC+01:00 (CET)
  - Summer (DST): UTC+02:00 (CEST)
- Postal codes: 67308
- Dialling codes: 06355
- Vehicle registration: KIB
- Website: albisheim.de

Albisheim is a municipality in the Donnersbergkreis, Rhineland-Palatinate, Germany. It is part of the Zellertal region.

== Geography ==
The village is located in the part of the Pfrimm Valley, known as Zellertal, which forms part of the Alzey Hills. Neighbouring municipalities are Stetten, Einselthum, Zellertal, Immesheim, Rüssingen, Marnheim and Gauersheim. Besides the village proper, the inhabited places Bahnhof Albisheim, Heyerhof and Pfortmühle are part of the municipality.

== History ==
Remnants indicate a Celtic settlement. In 835 the village was given to Prüm Abbey by emperor Louis the German. It appears as property of Prüm Abbey in 893. In early medieval times it belonged to the Duchy of Franconia. Otterberg Abbey held properties here since the 11th century. Early on Albisheim became a market town.

Until the 18th century the village was ruled by the House of Nassau-Weilburg and administrated from Kirchheimbolanden.

After the War of the First Coalition Albisheim was occupied and later annexed by France with the Treaty of Campo Formio in 1797. From 1798 to 1814 it belonged to the French Departement du Mont-Tonnerre. After the Congress of Vienna the region was first given to Austria (1815) and later to Bavaria (1816).

After World War II Albisheim became part of Rhineland-Palatinate (1946). Since 1969 it belongs to the Donnersbergkreis district.

== Politics ==
=== Council ===
The village council is composed of 16 members who were elected in a personalized proportional representation in the local elections on June 9, 2024, and the honorary mayor as chairman.

=== Heraldry ===
The coat of arms shows Saint Peter.

== Culture and sights ==
=== Festivals ===
Every year on the third weekend of September the Köngisfest ("King's festival") is held. The tradition can be traced back to the year 1222. There is also an end of winter celebration, regionally known as Stabaus.

=== Buildings ===
- Jewish cemetery
- houses along the main street (Hauptstraße)
- Protestant church from 1792,
- historic town hall, a classicist building from 1832
- Warteturm (first mentioned in 1551)
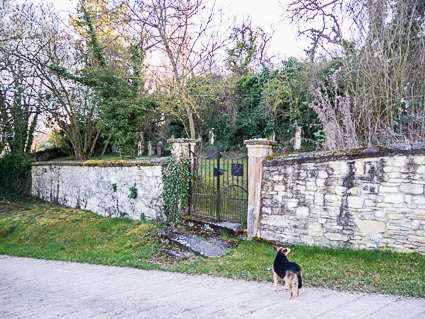
Jewish cemetery

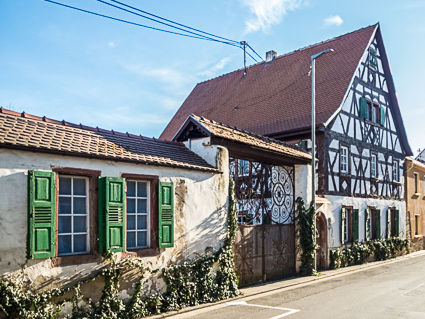
Hauptstraße 51

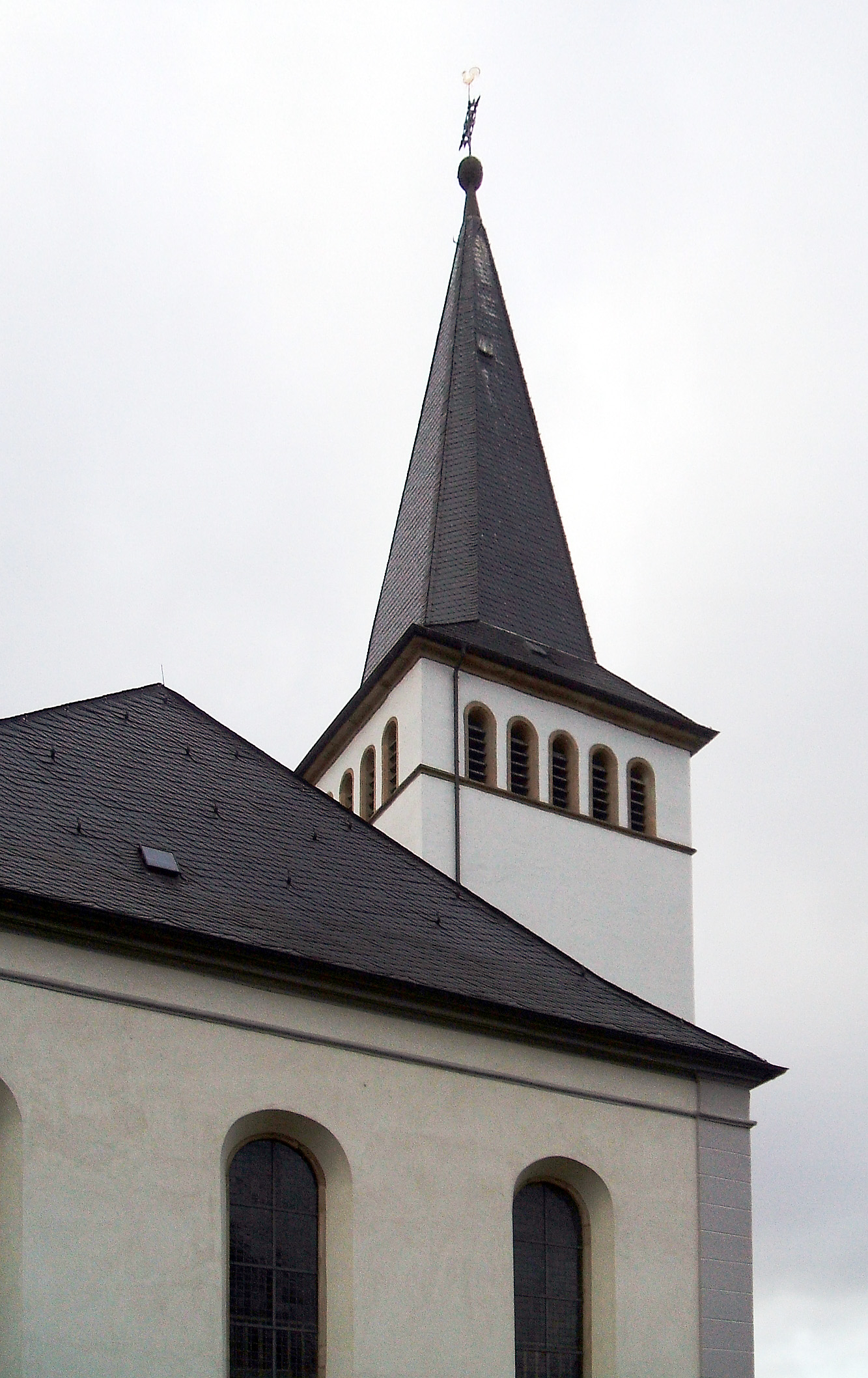
Protestant church

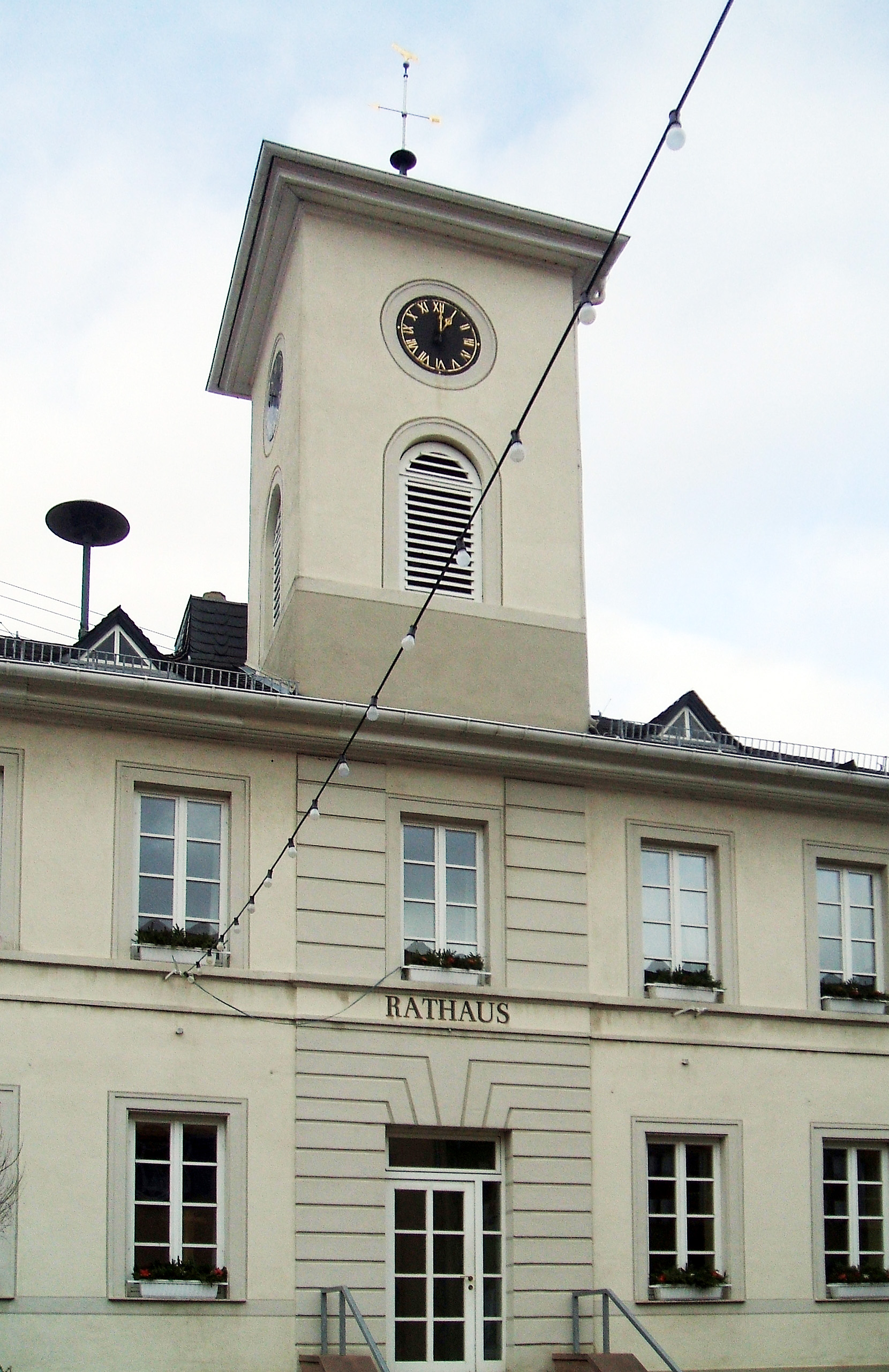
Town hall

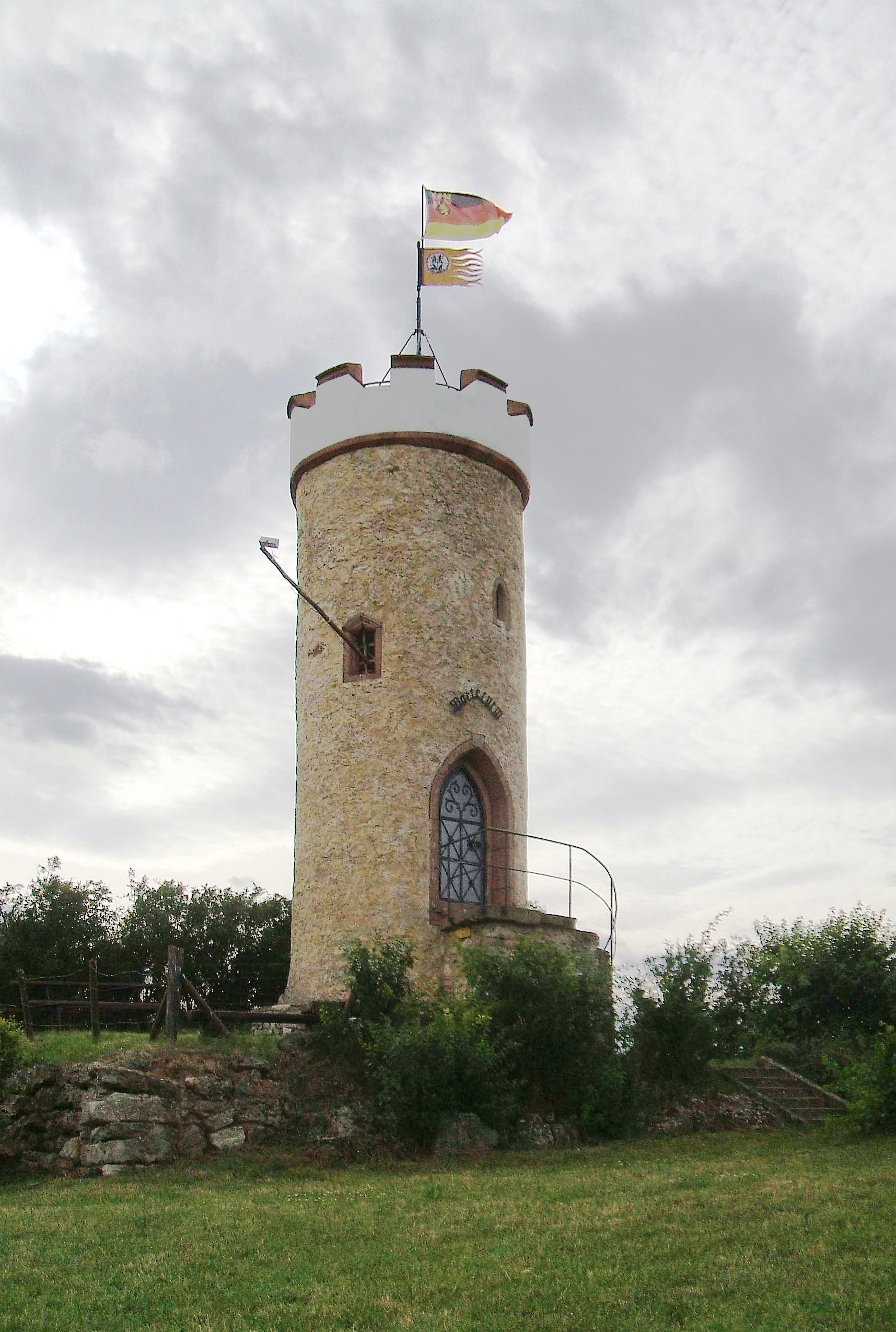
Warteturm

=== Nature ===
There are six protected natural monuments and two nature reserves (Saukopf and Osterberg) in the municipality.

== Economy and infrastructure ==
=== Economy ===
Albisheim is part of the Palatinate (wine region).

=== Infrastructure ===
==== Roads ====
federal road B47 bypasses Albisheim and connects it to Worms. The A63 can be reached 7 km (4.5 mi) to the northeast.

==== Public transit ====
Albisheim station along the Zeller Valley Railway has not been served by regular passenger trains since 1983. Weekend-trains ran from 2001 to 2016.

Bus lines 904 and 921 of the VRN serve Albisheim.
