= Marnheim =

- Municipality
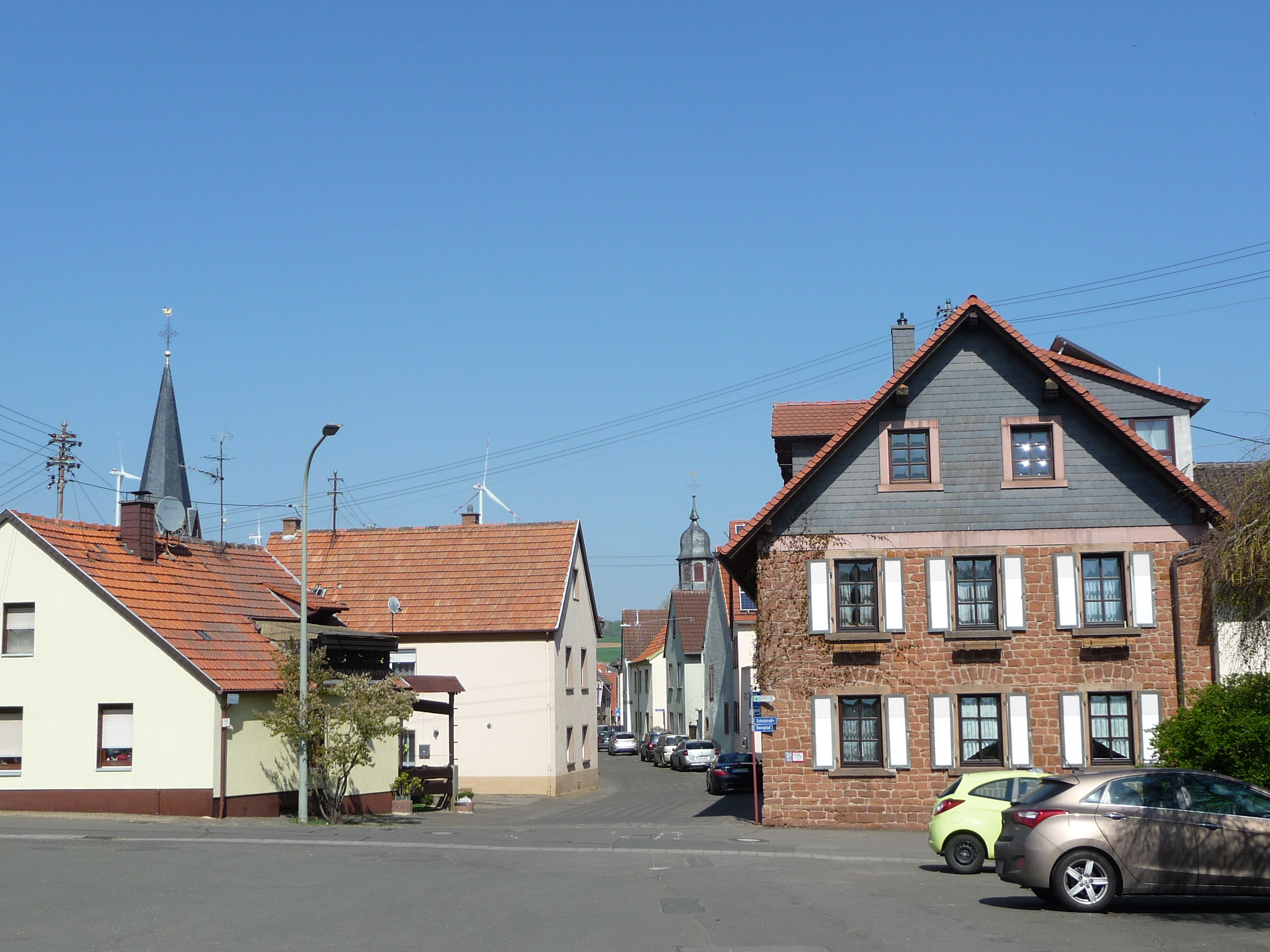
- village center

- Coat of arms

- Location of Marnheim within Donnersbergkreis district
- Interactive map of Marnheim
- Location within Germany Location within Rhineland-Palatinate
- Coordinates: 49°37′57″N 08°02′27″E
- Country: Germany
- State: Rhineland-Palatinate
- District: Donnersbergkreis
- Municipal assoc.: Kirchheimbolanden

Government
  - Mayor (2019–24): Tim Mühlbach

Area
  - Total: 9.95 km^{2} (3.84 sq mi)
- Elevation: 207 m (679 ft)

Population (2025-12-31)
  - Total: 1,844
  - Density: 185/km^{2} (480/sq mi)
- Time zone: UTC+01:00 (CET)
  - Summer (DST): UTC+02:00 (CEST)
- Postal codes: 67297
- Dialling codes: 06352, 06351
- Vehicle registration: KIB
- Website: www.kirchheimbolanden.de

Marnheim (German pronunciation: [ˈmaʁnhaɪm]) is a municipality in the Donnersbergkreis district, in Rhineland-Palatinate, Germany.

== Geography ==
Marnheim is located around 4 km (2.5 mi) south of Kirchheimbolanden. The nearest bigger cities are Worms and Kaiserslautern. The Pfrimm river flows through the village.

Neighbouring municipalities are Bolanden, Gauersheim, Albisheim, Rüssingen, Göllheim, Dreisen and Weitersweiler.

Besides the village proper, the inhabited places Berghof, Elbisheimerhof, Froschauerhof, Mittelmühle, Riedenmühle, Rothenbergermühle, Sandbrunner Häuschen and Steinmühle are all part of the municipality.

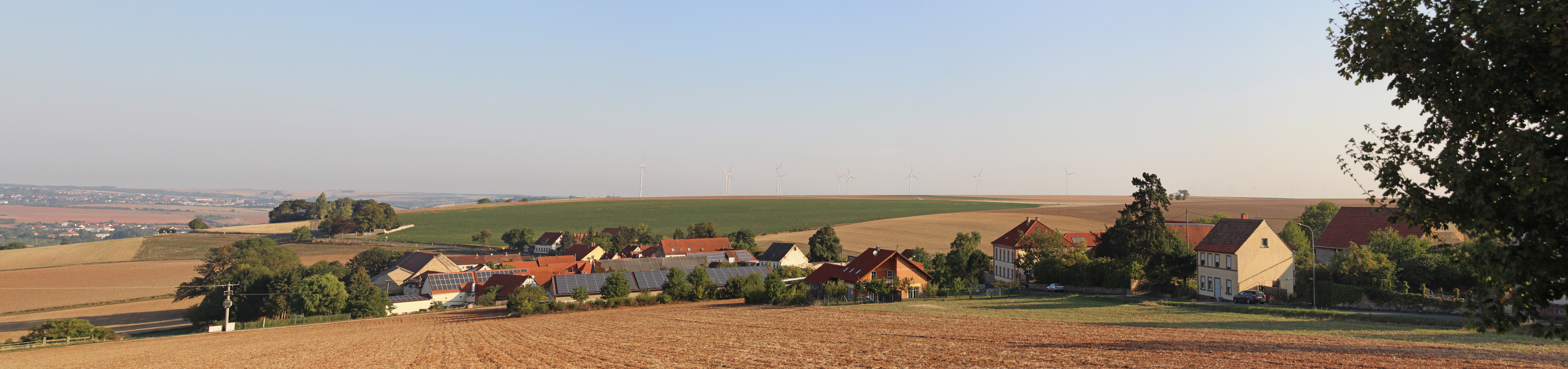
Elbisheimerhof

== History ==
In 774 Marnheim was mentioned as Mawenheim in the Lorsch codex. The settlement is probably older, as indicated by finds in the area. In 1135 the village is called Mouwenheim in a document of a certain Arnold of Mouwenheim.

In the Middle Ages Marnheim was part of the Dominion of Bolanden for a long time. Later it became part of the Electoral Palatinate and the Duchy of Nassau-Weilburg until the end of the 18th century.

After the War of the First Coalition Marnheim was occupied and later annexed by France with the Treaty of Campo Formio in 1797. From 1798 to 1814 it belonged to the French Departement du Mont-Tonnerre. After the Congress of Vienna the region was first given to Austria (1815) and later to Bavaria (1816).

In the context of the revolutionary battles of 1849, then prince of Prussia and later emperor William I signed the disputed Erklärung der Rheinpfalz in den Kriegszustand (Declaration of a state of war in the Palatinate). The table on which he did it is preserved in Kirchheimbolanden.

After World War II Marnheim became part of Rhineland-Palatinate (1946). Since 1969 it belongs to the Donnersbergkreis district.

== Religion ==
There is a protestant church in Marnheim. The catholics are part of St. Anna parish of Kirchheimbolanden. The local Jews were deported on 22 October 1940, as part of the Wagner-Bürckel-Aktion.

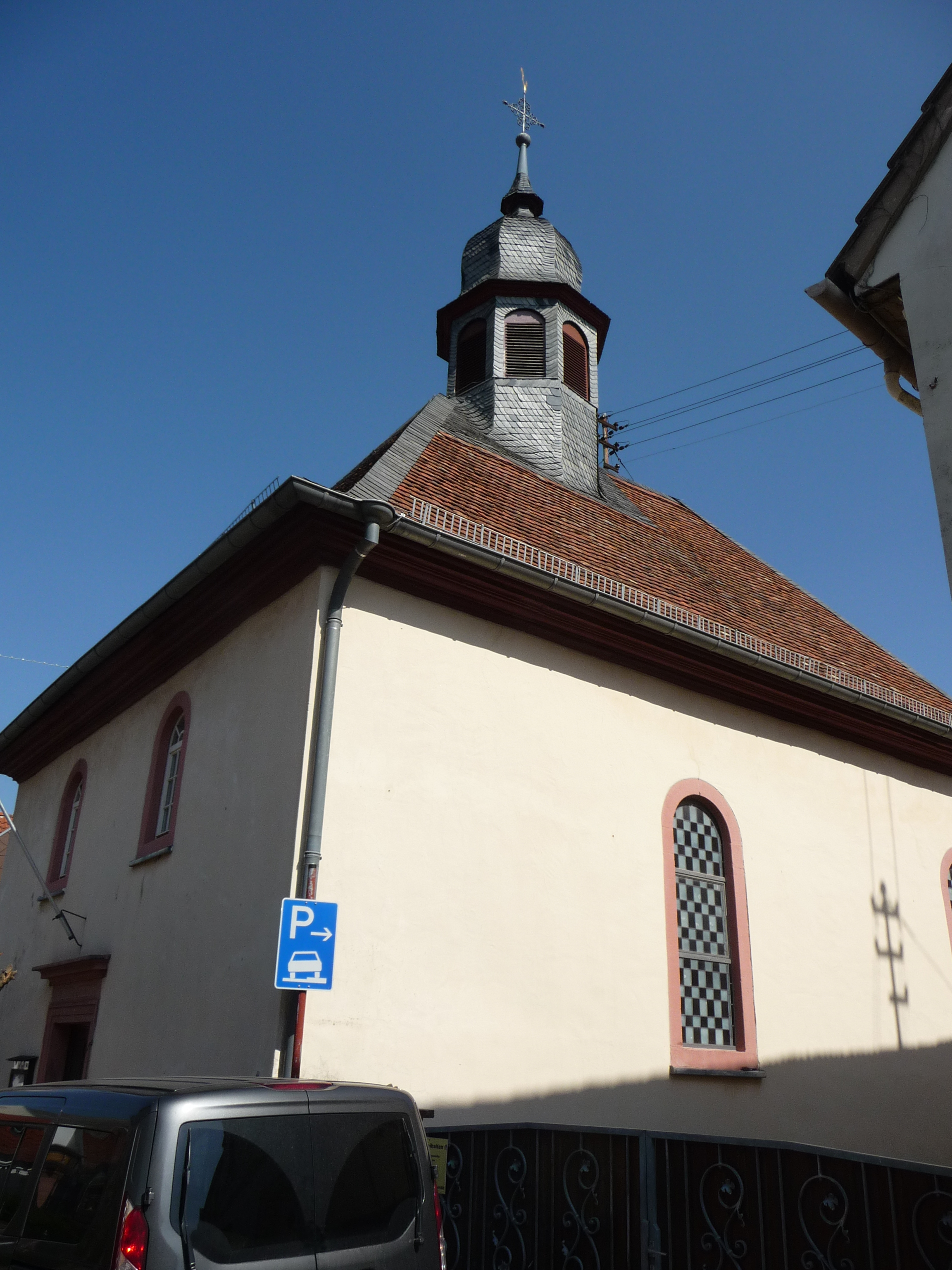
Protestant church

== Politics ==
=== Council ===
The village council is composed of 16 members who were elected in a personalized proportional representation in the local elections on June 9, 2024, and the honorary mayor as chairman.

=== Heraldry ===
The coat of arms shows a wheel of the Counts of Bolanden in the colours of the Counts of Wartenberg, the two advocatusses over Marnheim. The waves symbolise the Pfrimm river. It was granted by the Bavarian Ministry of the Interior in July 1930.

== Sights ==
The rest of the Pfrimm Viaduct is the most famous sight of Marnheim. It was once part of a railway bridge spanning the Pfrimm valley until it was blown-up in 1945 to block Allied Forces form advancing into German territory.

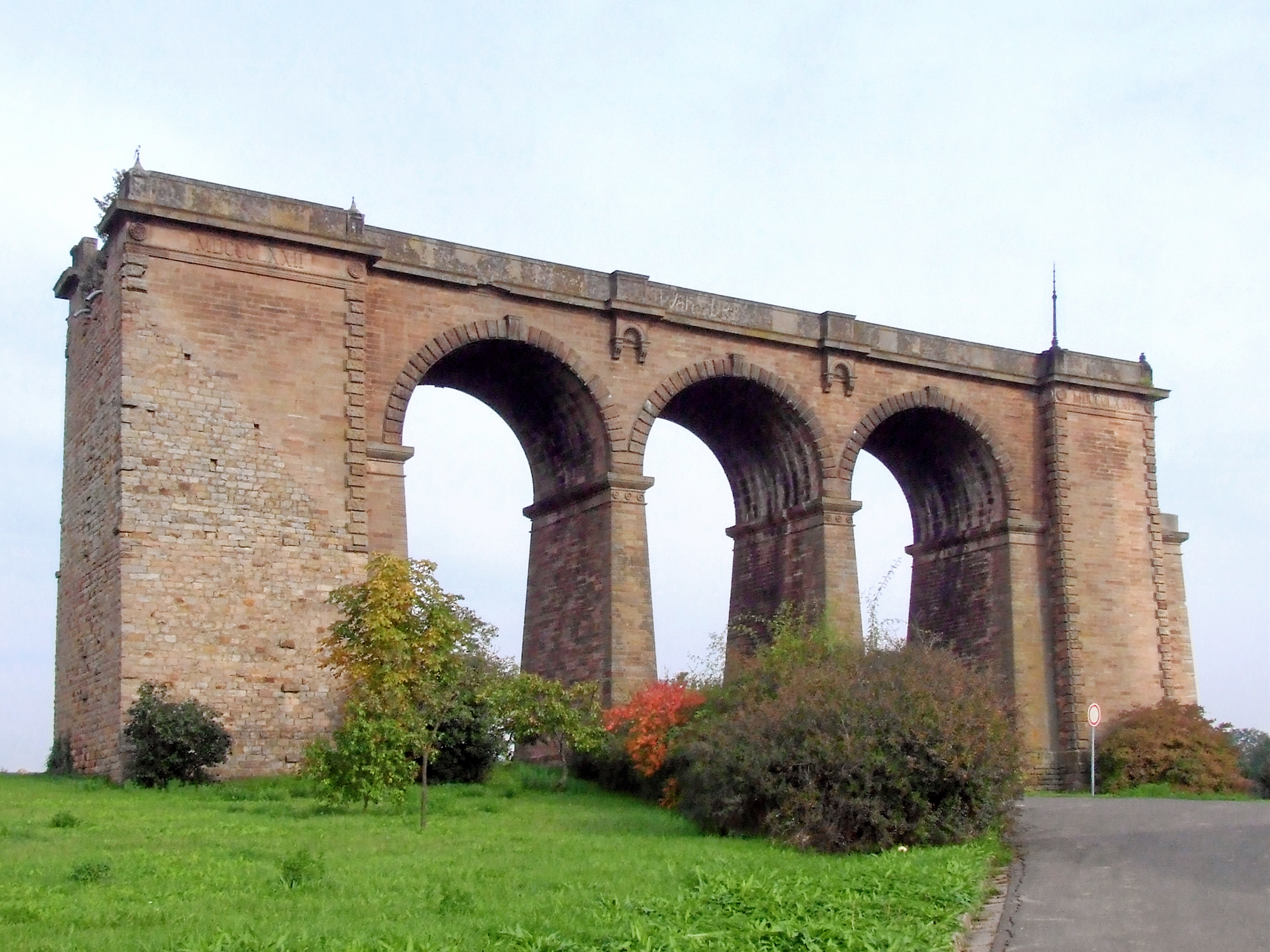
Pfrimm Viaduct

== Infrastructure ==
=== Roads ===
The federal roads B47 and B40 (former) pass the village. The A63 highway touches the west of the village at the municipal border with Bolanden.

=== Rail ===
Marnheim station is located at the Zeller Valley Railway, which is not served by passenger trains at the moment (2025). Until 1945 the station was a junction between the mentioned and the Donnersberg Railway.

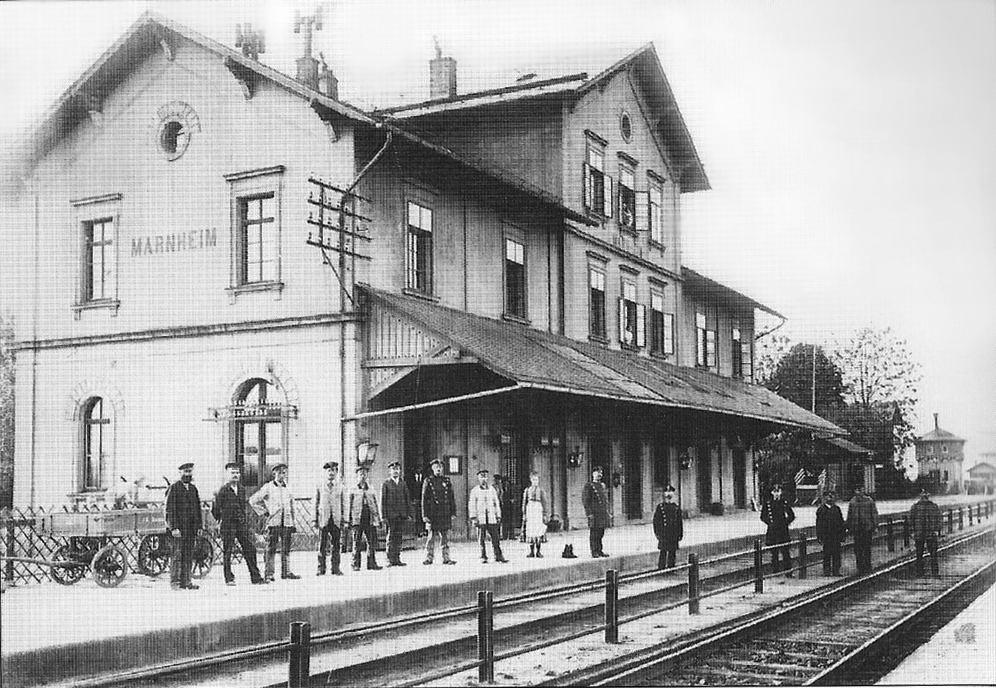
Station building

=== Education ===
The village has a kindergarten and an elementary school.
