= Ottersheim =

- Municipality
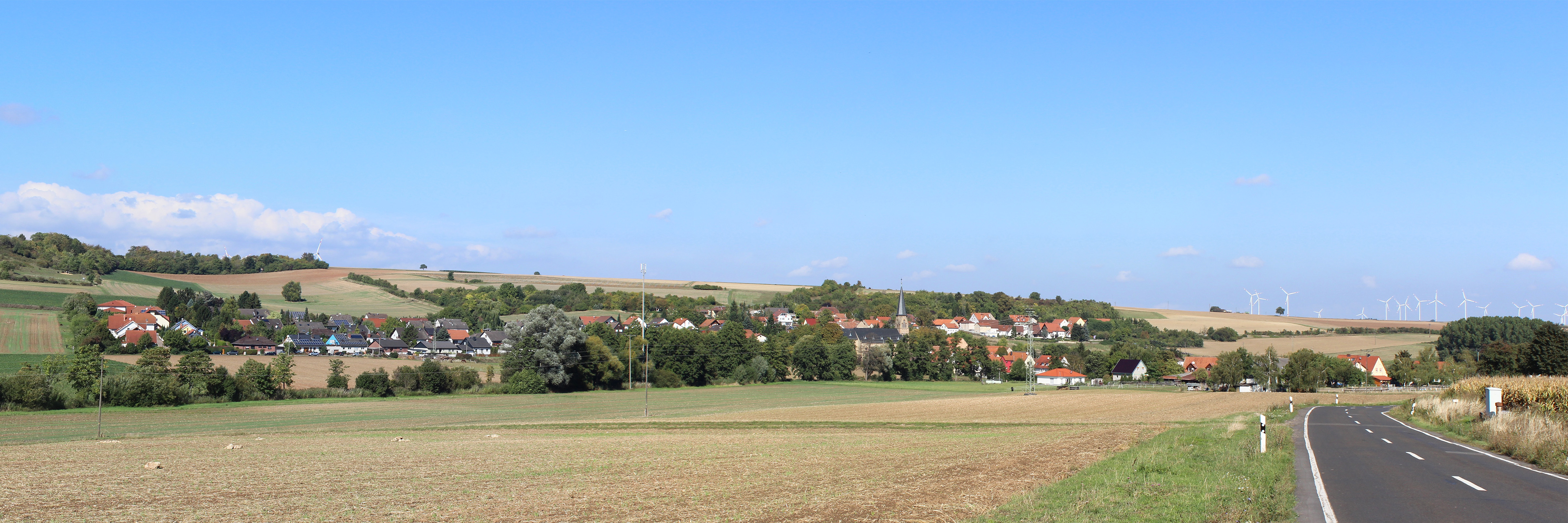
- panoramic view

- Coat of arms

- Location of Ottersheim within Donnersbergkreis district
- Interactive map of Ottersheim
- Location within Germany Location within Rhineland-Palatinate
- Coordinates: 49°37′32″N 08°06′30″E
- Country: Germany
- State: Rhineland-Palatinate
- District: Donnersbergkreis
- Municipal assoc.: Göllheim

Government
  - Mayor (2019–24): Rüdiger Kragl

Area
  - Total: 2.74 km^{2} (1.06 sq mi)
- Elevation: 233 m (764 ft)

Population (2025-12-31)
  - Total: 354
  - Density: 129/km^{2} (335/sq mi)
- Time zone: UTC+01:00 (CET)
  - Summer (DST): UTC+02:00 (CEST)
- Postal codes: 67308
- Dialling codes: 06355
- Vehicle registration: KIB
- Website: www.goellheim.de

Ottersheim (German pronunciation: [ˈɔtɐshaɪm]) is a municipality in the Donnersbergkreis district, in Rhineland-Palatinate, Germany.

== Geography ==
The village is situated in the northern part of the Palatinate about 20 km (13 mi) west of Worms and 40 km (25 mi) east of Kaiserslautern.

Neighbouring municipalities are Immesheim, Bubenheim, Kindenheim, Biedesheim and Rüssingen.

== History ==
Ottersheim was already settled during Roman times, as proven by sarcophagi found in the late 19th century. It was first mentioned in the Lorsch codex in 772. In medieval times the village belonged to multiple dominions until it came under the sole reign of the Electoral Palatinate in 1481. Regarding this, Ottersheim has close ties to neighbouring Immesheim.

The village developed around two centers, which grew together in the 19th century.

After the War of the First Coalition Ottersheim was occupied and later annexed by France with the Treaty of Campo Formio in 1797. From 1798 to 1814 it belonged to the French Departement du Mont-Tonnerre. After the Congress of Vienna the region was first given to Austria (1815) and later to Bavaria (1816).

After World War II Ottersheim became part of Rhineland-Palatinate (1946). Since 1969 it belongs to the Donnersbergkreis district.

== Religion ==
Ottersheim is a catholic village. The local parish church St. Amandus was built in the late 19th century. It is known as „Dom vom Violental“ (Violental Cathedral), due to its big proportions.

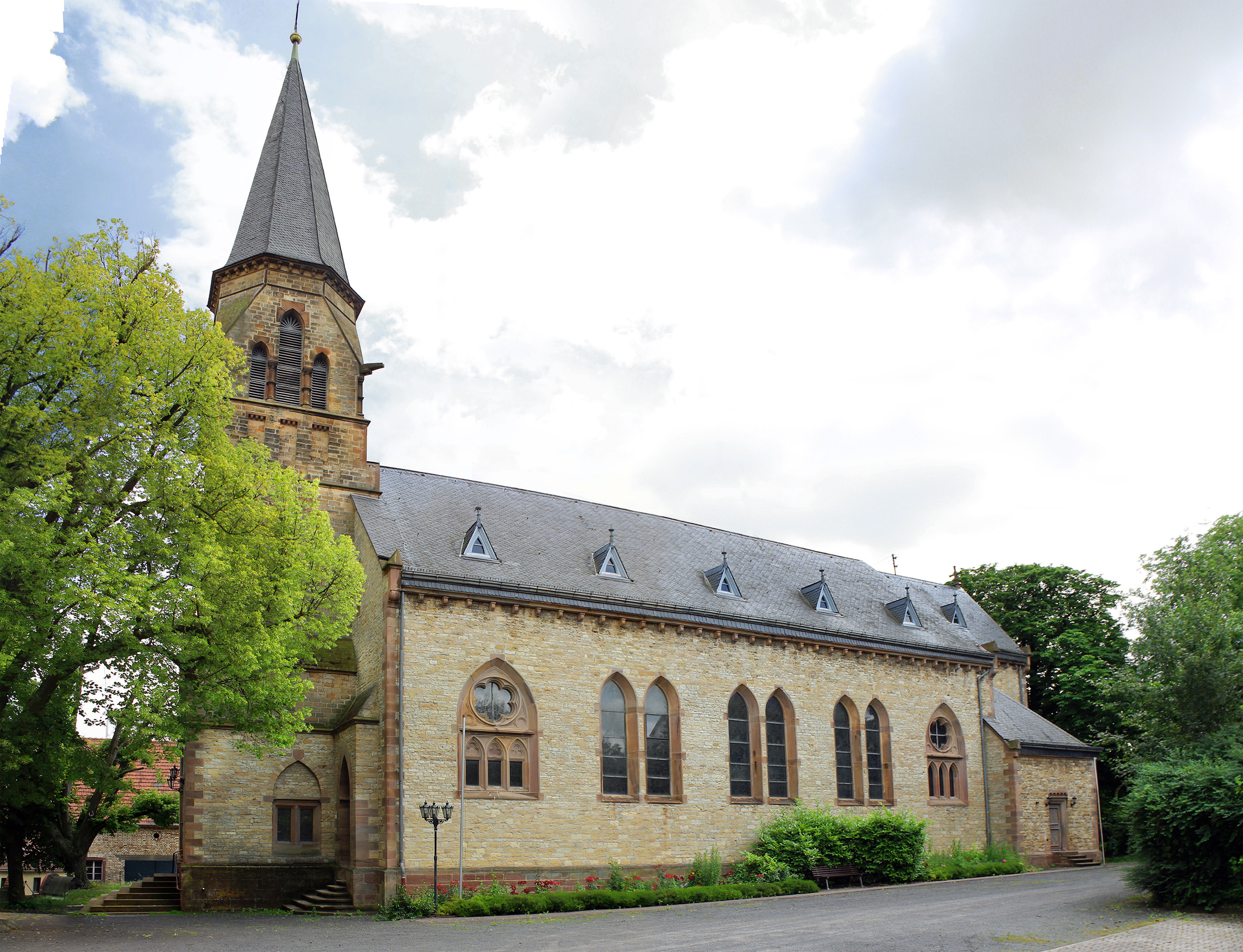
St. Amandus church

== Infrastructure ==
The next train station that is regularly served by passenger rail service is located in Ebertsheim, 8 km (5 mi) south of Ottersheim. The village's only bus stop is served by line 904 of the VRN.
