= Rüssingen =

- Municipality
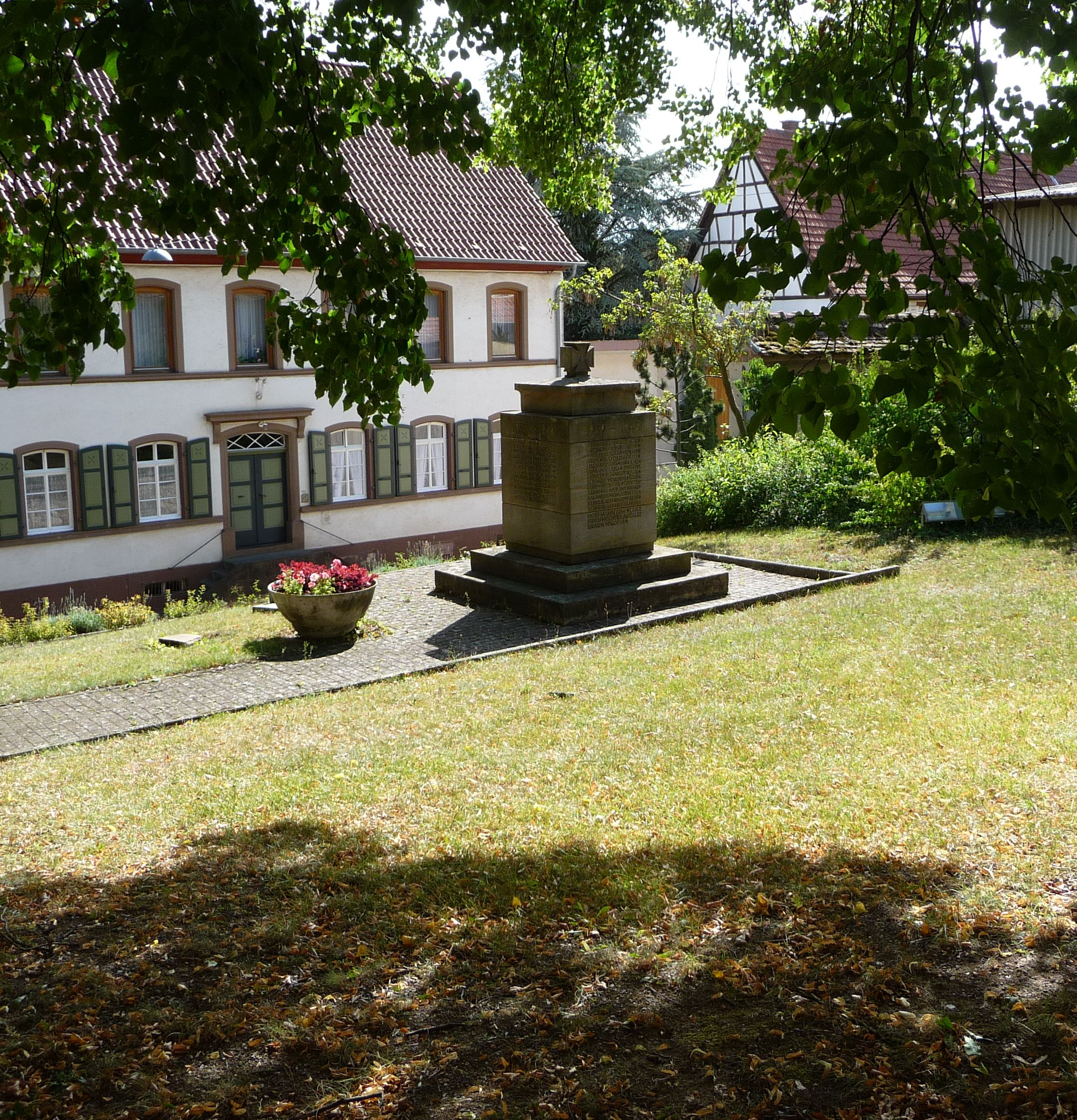
- war memorial

- Coat of arms

- Location of Rüssingen within Donnersbergkreis district
- Interactive map of Rüssingen
- Location within Germany Location within Rhineland-Palatinate
- Coordinates: 49°36′56″N 08°05′17″E
- Country: Germany
- State: Rhineland-Palatinate
- District: Donnersbergkreis
- Municipal assoc.: Göllheim

Government
  - Mayor (2019–24): Steffen Antweiler (FW)

Area
  - Total: 4.84 km^{2} (1.87 sq mi)
- Elevation: 223 m (732 ft)

Population (2025-12-31)
  - Total: 530
  - Density: 110/km^{2} (280/sq mi)
- Time zone: UTC+01:00 (CET)
  - Summer (DST): UTC+02:00 (CEST)
- Postal codes: 67308
- Dialling codes: 06355
- Vehicle registration: KIB
- Website: www.ruessingen.com

Rüssingen (German pronunciation: [ˈʁʏsɪŋən]) is a municipality in the Donnersbergkreis district, in Rhineland-Palatinate, Germany.

== Geography ==
The municipality is located between Kaiserslautern and Worms around 4 km (2.5 mi) east of Göllheim. The landscape is part of the Alzey Hills. In the northeast of the district the Zollstock hill is located. 80.5% of Rüssingen's area are used for agriculture.

Neighbouring municipalities are Albisheim, Immesheim, Ottersheim, Biedesheim, Göllheim and Marnheim. Besides the village proper, the municipality includes the inhabited place Lindenhof.

== History ==
=== Etymology ===
There are two theories regarding the name "Rüssingen".

1. Platz an dem es viele Rosse gab = "place of many horses"
2. Platz bei den Leuten des Hrusso = "place of Hrusso's people"

=== History ===
Archaeological finds indicate settlements from the Neolithic, Bronze and Iron Age. The "Rüssingen Ploughshare" made from limestone is the most well known artifact from the village's early history.

The oldest surviving documentation of Rüssingen's existence dates back to 773 and can be found in the Lorsch codex. In the late 8th century several properties were gifted to Lorsch Abbey.

In later times it seemed to have been a Reichsgut, belonging directly to the Holy Roman Emperors. Around 1190 the counts of Leiningen had given the village to Werner II of Bolanden as fief. Through this Rüssingen became part of the Dominion of Kirchheim that fell to Philipp I of Nassau-Weilburg in 1393. Otterberg Abbey held properties in the village.

The compact appearance of the village indicates, that it was fortified during the Middle Ages. There are no documents proving this thesis. A local noble family eponymous to the village is documented from 1135 to 1424. They were vassals to the Bolanden family.

The Counts of Nassau-Saabrücken ruled the village until 1574 when the House of Nassau-Weilburg took over. Their rule ended after the War of the First Coalition. Rüssingen was occupied and later annexed by France with the Treaty of Campo Formio in 1797. From 1798 to 1814 it belonged to the French Departement du Mont-Tonnerre. After the Congress of Vienna the region was first given to Austria (1815) and later to Bavaria (1816).

After World War II Rüssingen became part of Rhineland-Palatinate (1946). Since 1969 it belongs to the Donnersbergkreis district.

== Religion ==
Since the Reformation Rüssingen was Protestant. A Catholic parish was established again in the second half of the 17th century. The position was not filled after the death of the local priest in 1696. After being part of the Catholic parish of Kirchheimbolanden for a few years Rüssingen came under the jurisdiction of Göllheim's parish in 1707. There was a chapel 500 m northwest of the village.

== Politics ==
=== Council ===
The village council is composed of 12 members who were elected in a personalized proportional representation in the local elections on June 9, 2024, and the honorary mayor as chairman.

=== Heraldry ===
The coat of arms shows an argent horse on an azur background.

== Culture and sights ==
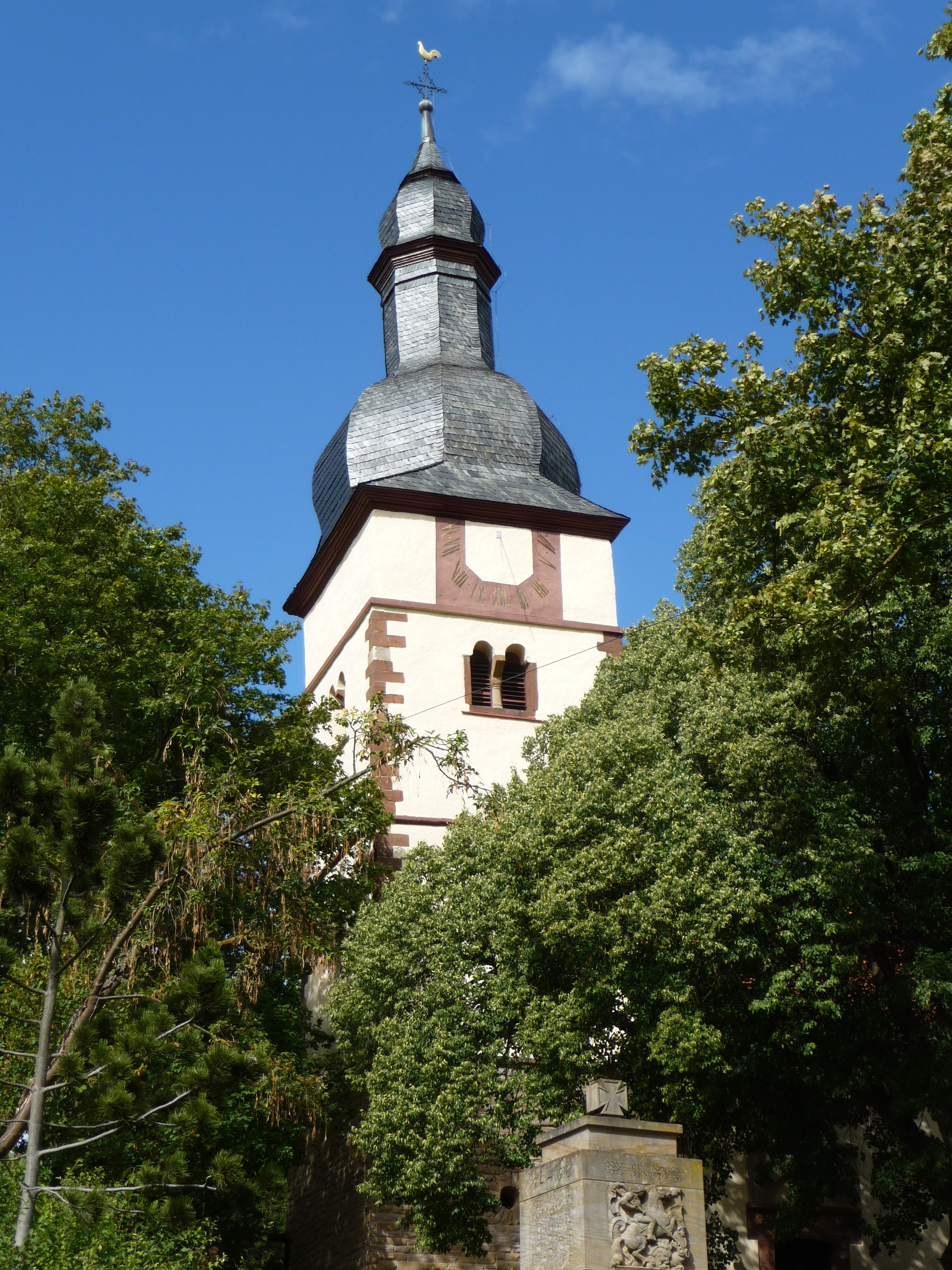
Protestant church

=== Buildings ===
The main street (Hauptstraße) is a prodected architectural ensemble. Like neighbouring Biedesheim and Ottersheim Rüssingen is a linear settlement. The Hauptstraße is an almost completely intact ensemble of calssicist buildings from the 18th and 19th centuries.

The Protestant church is also protected.

=== Nature ===
The Adolphslinde was a 700-year-old lime tree northwest of the village, which had a circumference of 8 m. Legend has it that Adolf of Nassau broke a branch of the tree to put on his helmet before the Battle of Göllheim against his rival Albert I of Germany. The tree fell victim to a storm in 1952.

=== Clubs ===
- TuS Rüssingen (football)
- Rischinger Narre-Gaul e.V. (carnival)

=== Festivals ===
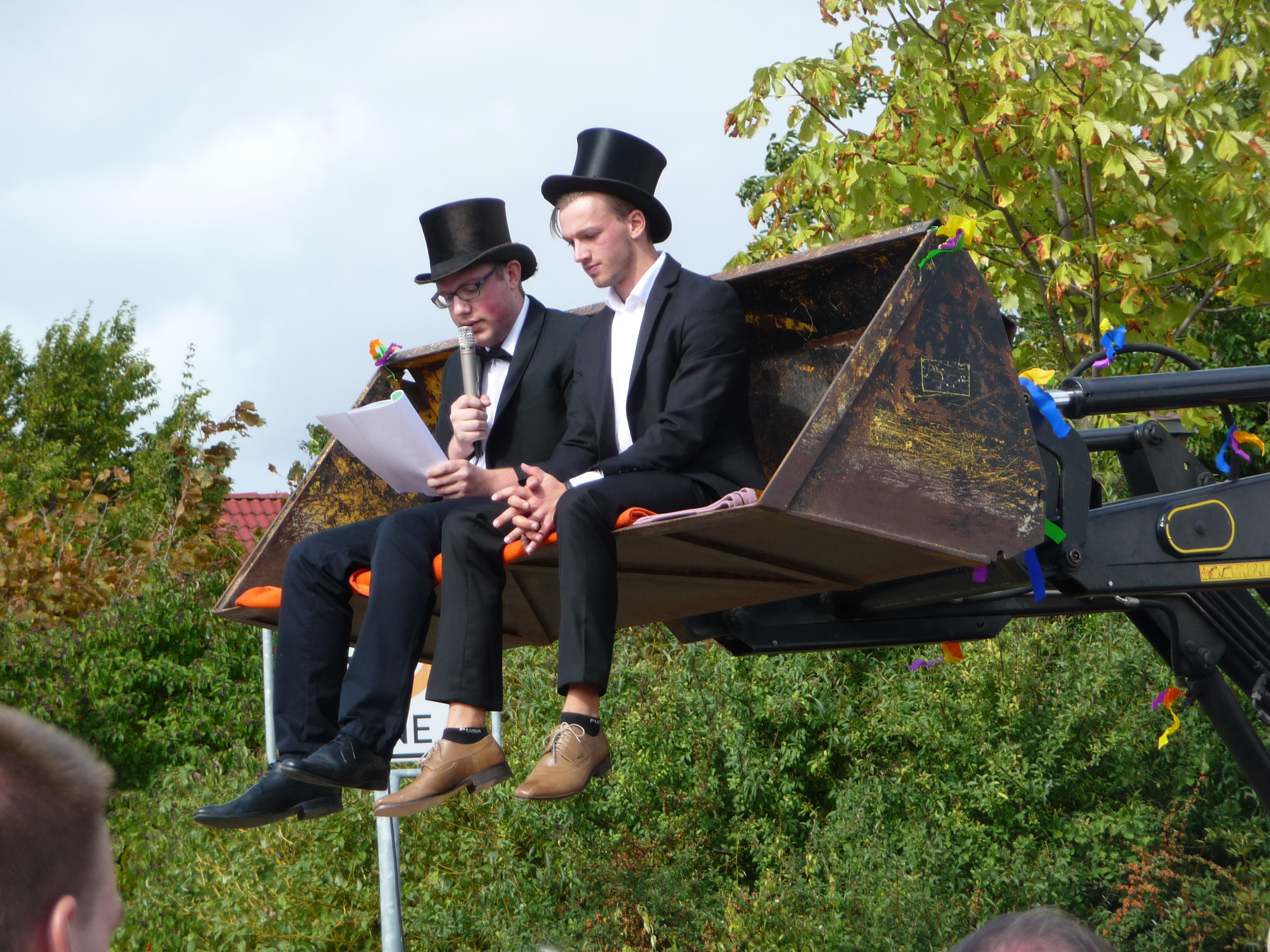
Kerwe

- Dorffest (3rd weekend in June)
- Kerwe (1st weekend in September)
- Gaulssteigwanderung (October)
- Nikolausmarkt (2nd weekend of Advent)

== Economy and infrastructure ==
=== Economy ===
Rüssingen is part of the Palatinate wine region.

A quarry of cement producer Dyckerhoff is located 500 m north of the village. Lime stone is mined here since the 1960s. Its mighty white and yellow silhouette can be seen from afar. It has become a safe haven for wildlife.

=== Infrastructure ===
==== Roads ====
Rüssingen is connected by two minor roads to Ottersheim, Biedesheim and Göllheim. The A63 highway is 8 km (5 mi) to the west and can be reached via Göllheim.

==== Public transit ====
Rüssingen is connected by bus line 904 of the VRN to Kirchheimbolanden, Göllheim and Eisenberg. The next train station is Albisheim along the Zeller Valley Railway which is not served by passenger trains at the moment.
