= Lautersheim =

- Municipality
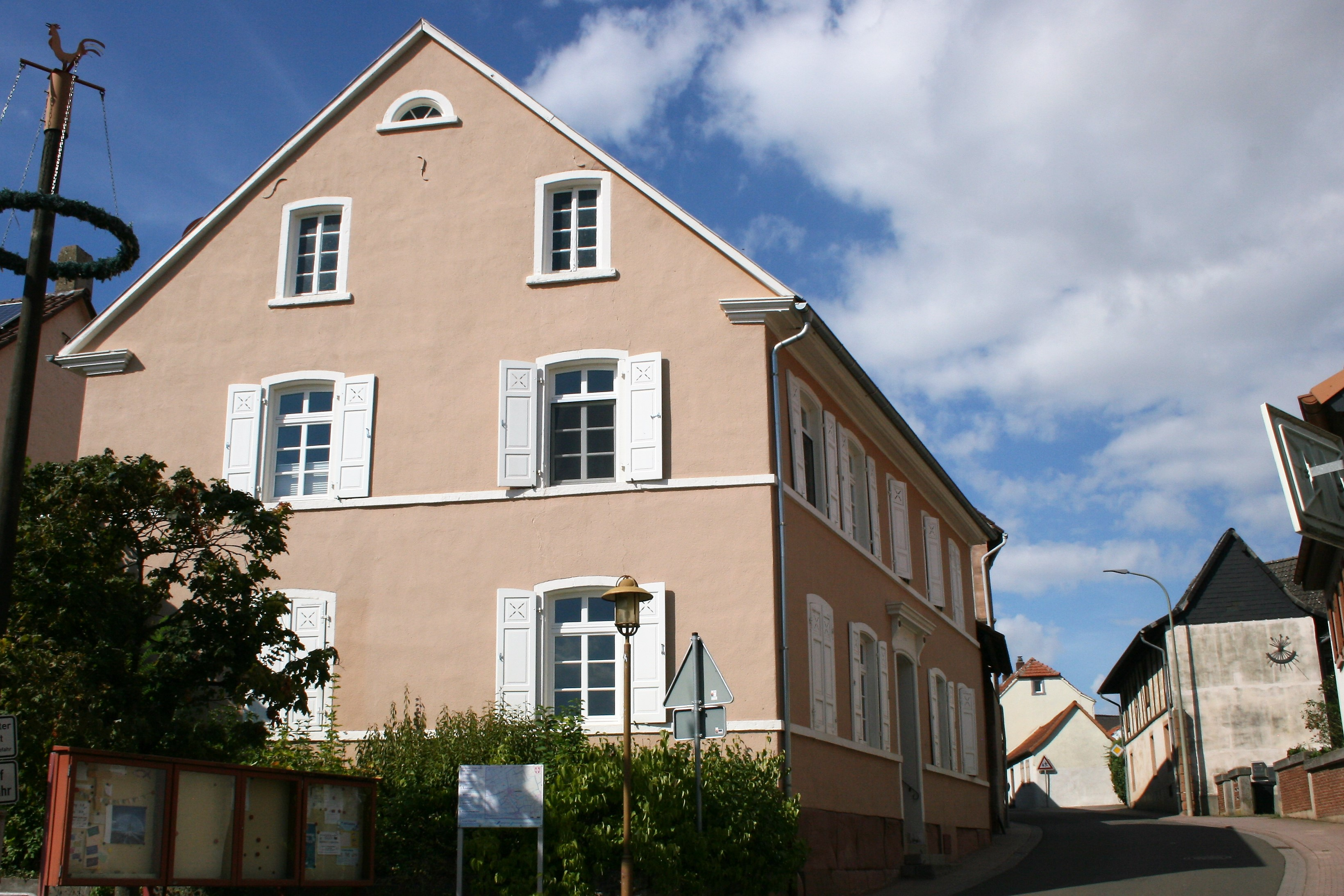
- main street

- Coat of arms

- Location of Lautersheim within Donnersbergkreis district
- Interactive map of Lautersheim
- Location within Germany Location within Rhineland-Palatinate
- Coordinates: 49°35′13″N 08°05′53″E
- Country: Germany
- State: Rhineland-Palatinate
- District: Donnersbergkreis
- Municipal assoc.: Göllheim

Government
  - Mayor (2019–24): Thomas Mattern

Area
  - Total: 3.71 km^{2} (1.43 sq mi)
- Elevation: 198 m (650 ft)

Population (2025-12-31)
  - Total: 629
  - Density: 170/km^{2} (439/sq mi)
- Time zone: UTC+01:00 (CET)
  - Summer (DST): UTC+02:00 (CEST)
- Postal codes: 67308
- Dialling codes: 06351
- Vehicle registration: KIB
- Website: www.goellheim.de

Lautersheim (German pronunciation: [ˈlaʊtɐshaɪm]) is a municipality in the Donnersbergkreis district, in Rhineland-Palatinate, Germany.

== Geography ==
The village is located in the North Palatinate between Kaiserslautern and Worms.

It is part of the Göllheim Hills, a subsection of the Alzey Hills. The south of the district makes up the northern slope of the Eisenberg basin. The Galgenberg (302,1 m) is situated north, the Esper (309 m) west of the village proper, along the border with Kerzenheim. The Rodenbach stream flows 1 km south of Lautersheim.

Neighbouring municipalities are Göllheim, Biedesheim, Quirnheim, Ebertsheim and Kerzenheim.

== History ==
Early documents mention a village called "liutmersheim" or "liutresheim", that was given to Lorsch Abbey. It is unclear if the documents are about Lautersheim or Laumersheim, which is located just 10 km (6 mi) east. In the 13th century the village belonged to Höningen Abbey near Altleiningen. In the 15th century Rosenthal Abbey, west of neighbouring Kerzenheim, owned properties in the village. Otterberg Abbey held properties at the place.

An eponymous noble family is documented after 1238. After they died out the Counts of Leiningen-Westerburg took over until the end of the 18th century, when Lautersheim was occupied after the War of the First Coalition and later annexed by France with the Treaty of Campo Formio in 1797. From 1798 to 1814 it belonged to the French Departement du Mont-Tonnerre. After the Congress of Vienna the region was first given to Austria (1815) and later to Bavaria (1816).

After World War II Lautersheim became part of Rhineland-Palatinate (1946). Since 1969 it belongs to the Donnersbergkreis district.

== Religion ==
The local protestants are part of the parish of Kerzenheim. The catholic filial church was administrated by the parish of St. Oswald in Boßweiler until 2007, when it became part of Göllheim‘s catholic parish.

== Politics ==
=== Council ===
The village council is composed of 12 members who were elected in a personalized proportional representation in the local elections on June 9, 2024, and the honorary mayor as chairman.

=== Sister municipality ===
Lautersheim is twinned with Abtsbessingen, Thuringia.

== Culture and sights ==
=== Buildings ===
There are 13 protected buildings in Lautersheim, including the two churches. The protestant church was built in 1837 from sandstone. The catholics use a "Notkirche" (roughly translated to "emergency church") built from wood in 1912.

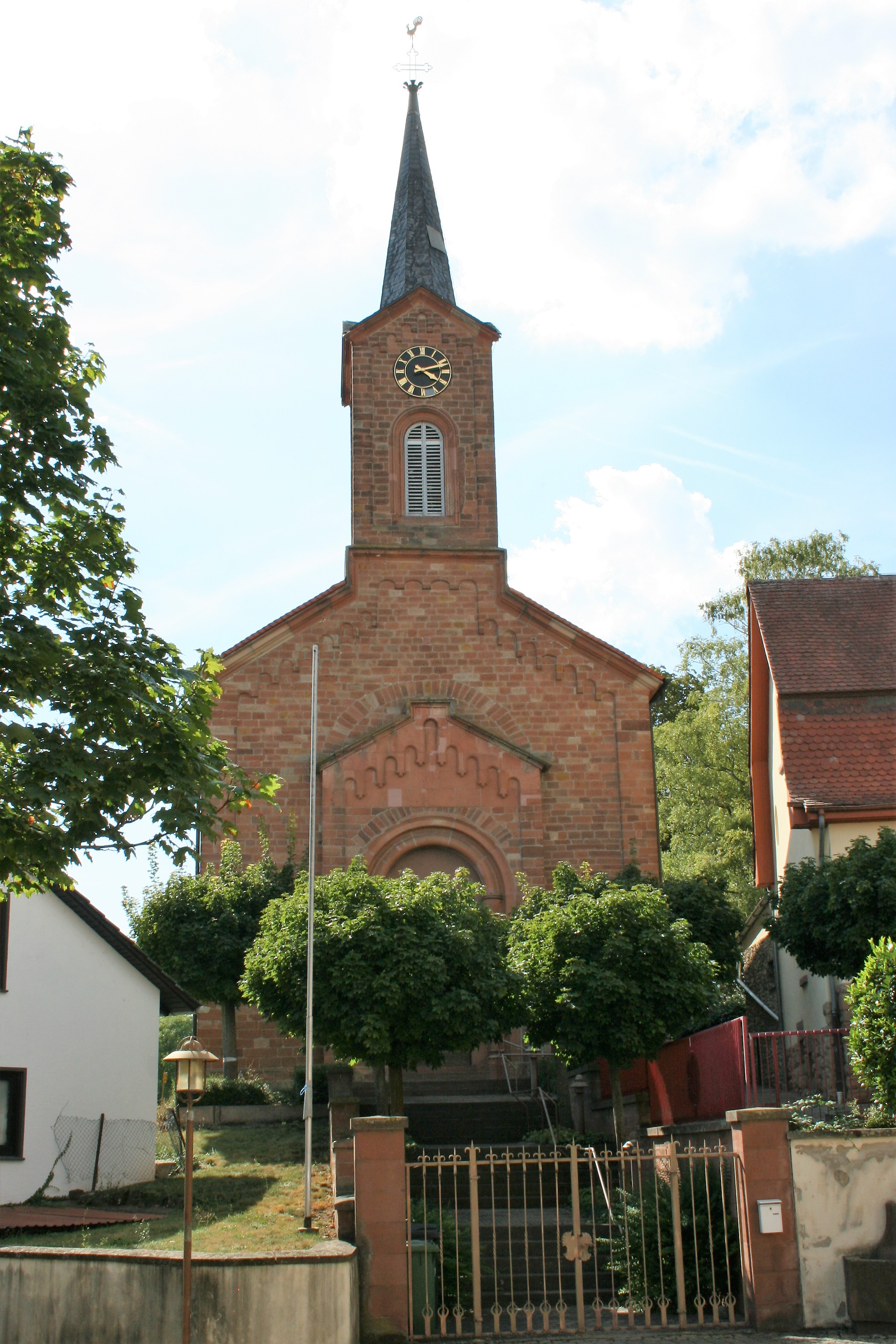
Protestant church

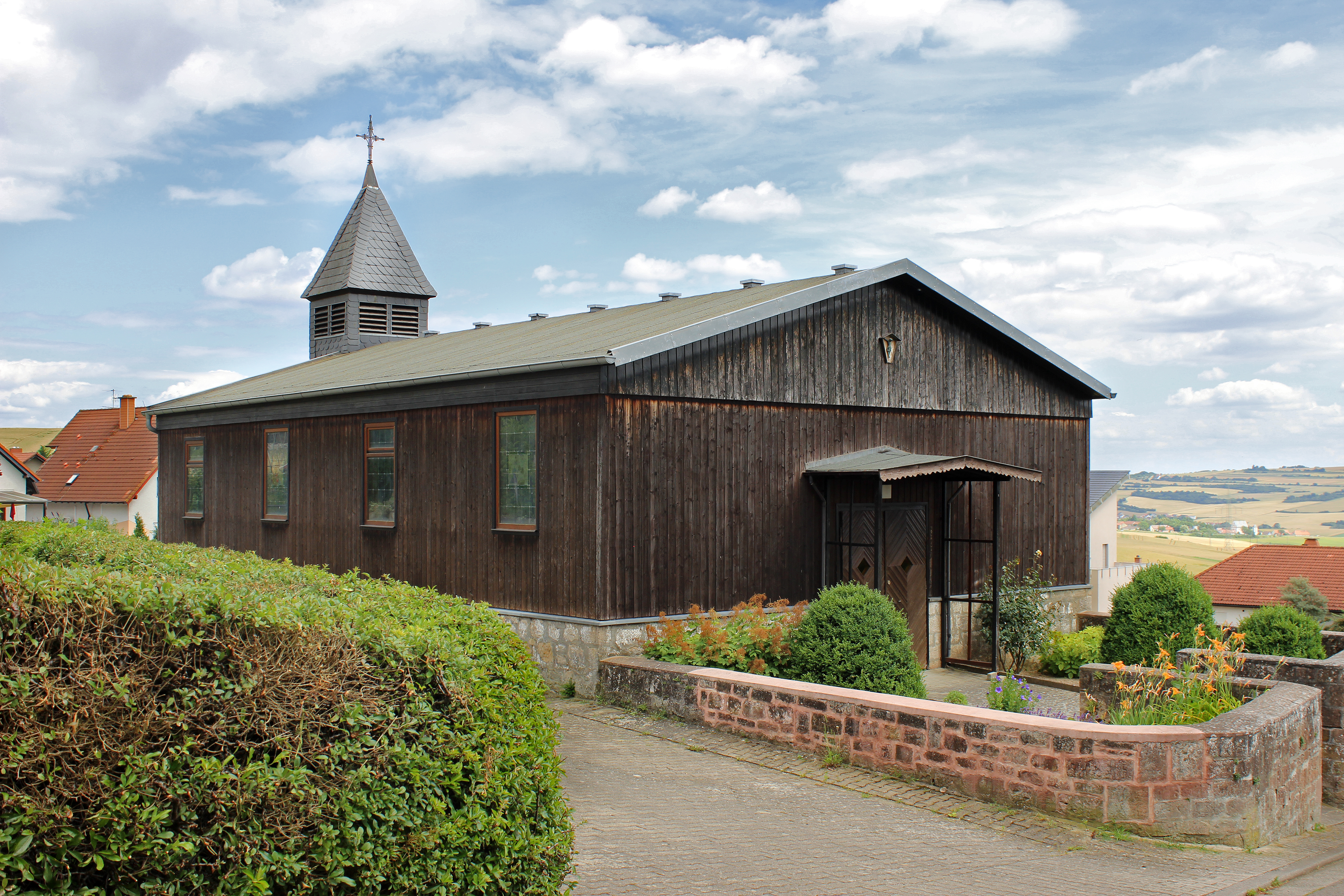
Catholic church

=== Nature ===
There are 16 fruit trees along the road to Ebertsheim that are protected.

=== Festivals ===
The local Kerwe is celebrated on the fourth weekend in September since 1968.

=== Theatre ===
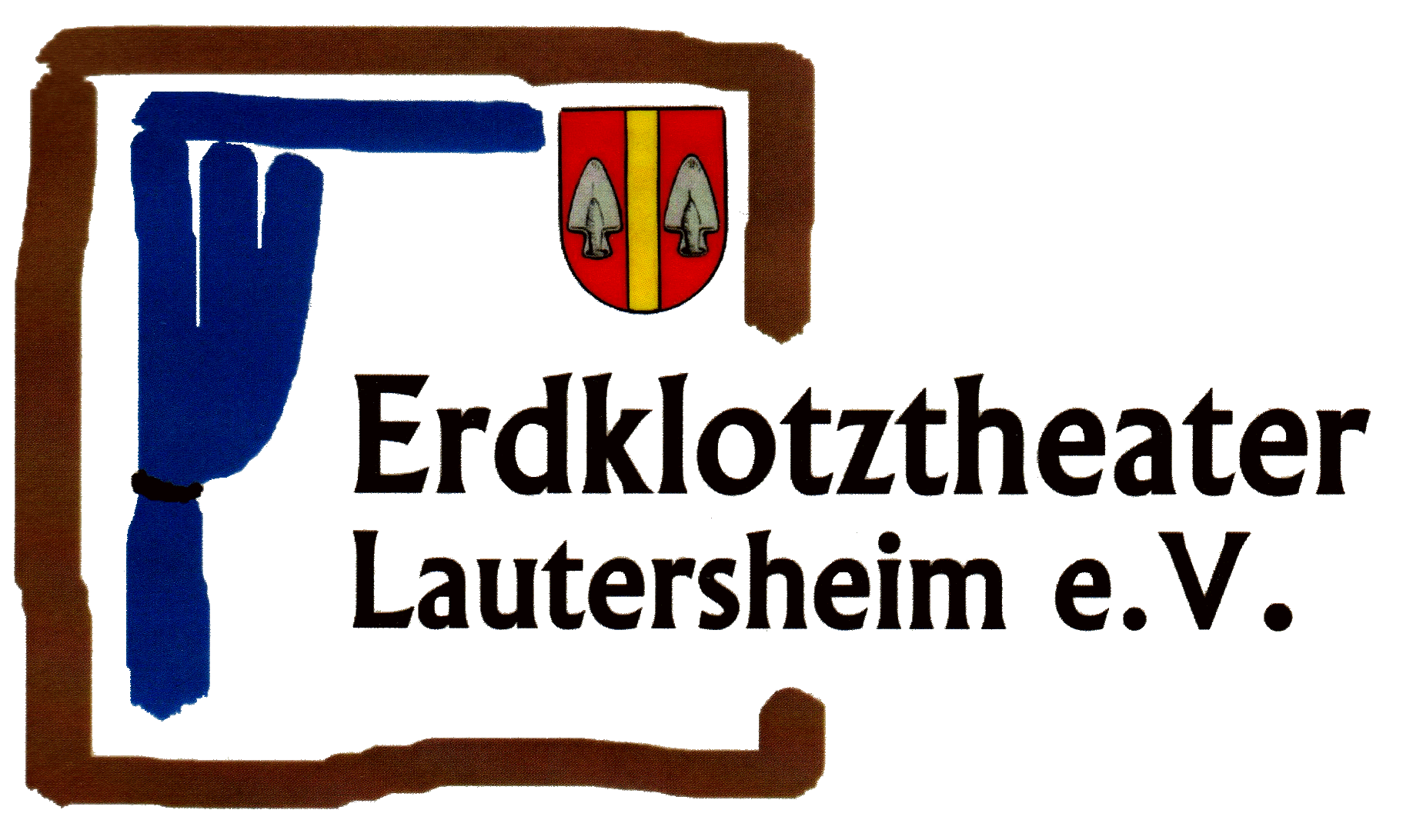
Erdklotzheater Lautersheim

There is a theater club in the village. It has its roots in a project to commemorate the jubilee of "Singkreis 80" a subsection of the local sports club in 1985. Since 2008 the club is independent.

=== Sports ===
Local football club SV Lautersheim has been playing in the lowest league of German football (Kreisklasse) since its founding in 1953.

== Economy and infrastructure ==
=== Economy ===
The stoneware factory in Grünstadt obtained clay from Lautersheim.

=== Infrastructure ===
The village is connected to its neighbours by minor roads. A63 highway can be reached in 8 km (5 mi), via Göllheim. A6 highway can be reached in 11 km (7 mi), via Eisenberg.

The nearest train station is Ebertsheim along the Eis Valley Railway, 3.5 km (2 mi) away.

== People ==
=== Born in Lautersheim ===
- Philipp Leonhard Mann (1819-1876), Bavarian parliamentary deputy
- Johann Adam Mann (1821-1886), Bavarian parliamentary deputy
- Marek Böckmann (born 1996), racing driver

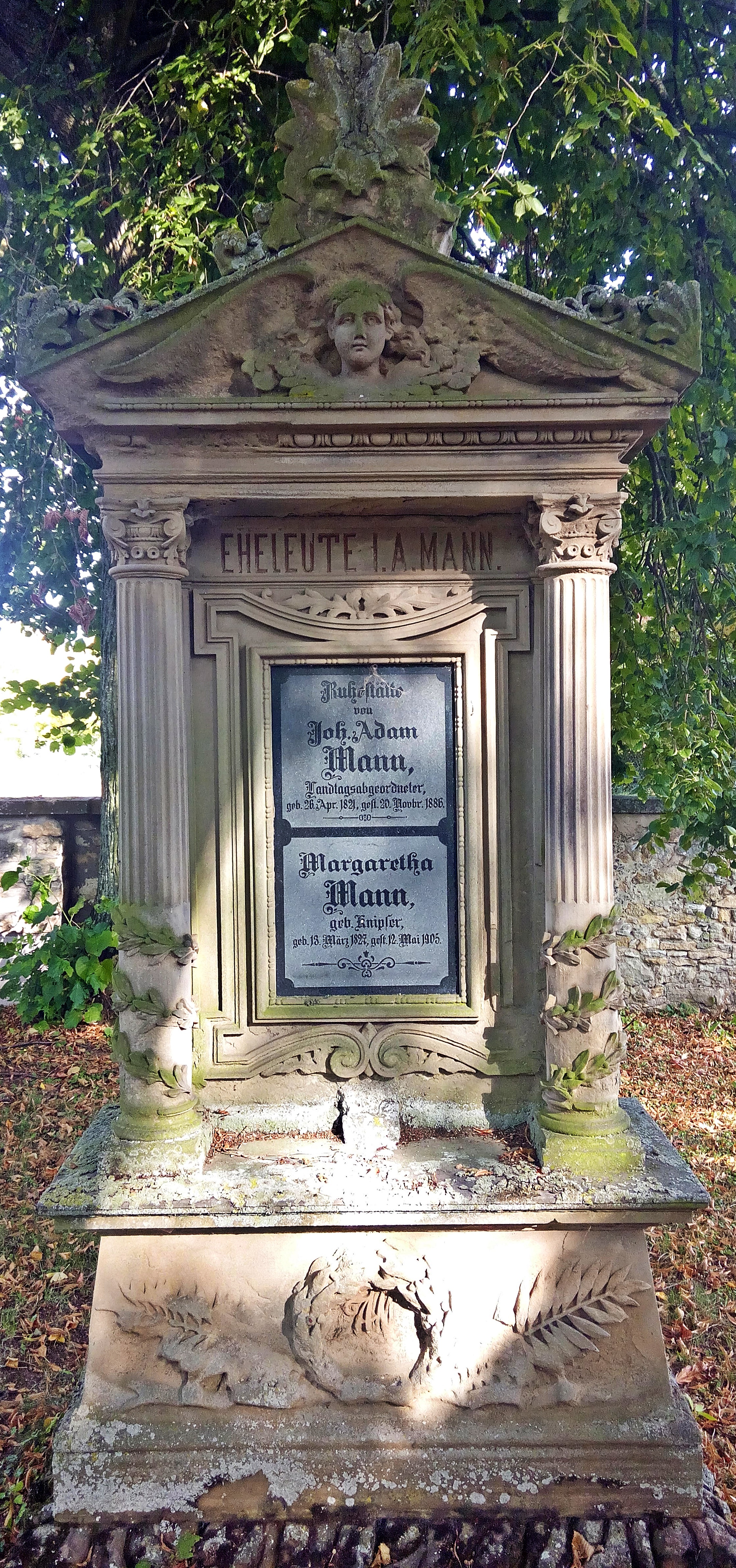
grave of Johann Adam Mann (1821–1886)

=== Connected to Lautersheim ===
- Ludwig von Gemmingen-Hornberg (1901-1978), nobleman and politician, lived here from 1964 until his death
