= Biedesheim =

- Municipality
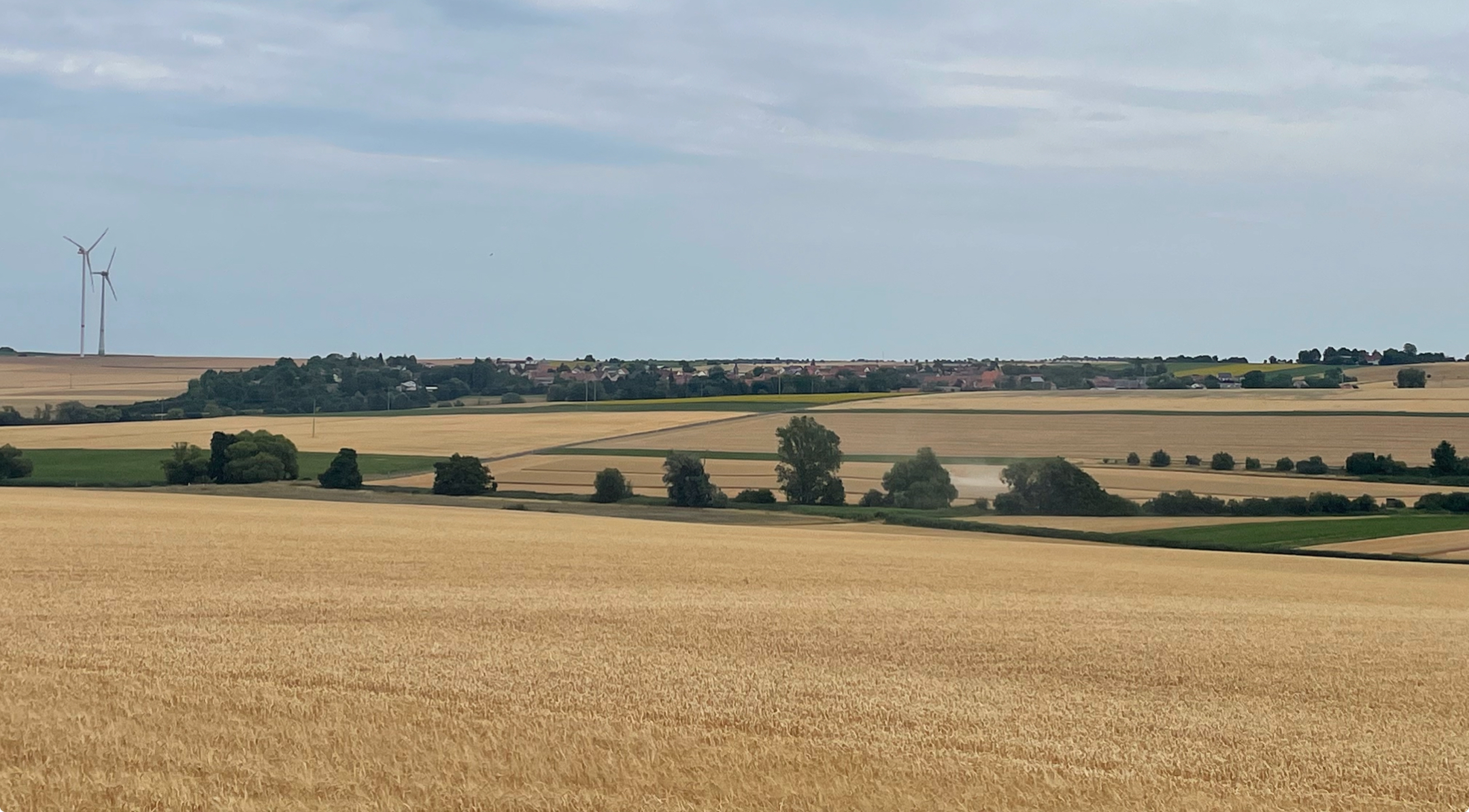
- Biedesheim seen from the road between Göllheim and Rüssingen

- Coat of arms

- Location of Biedesheim within Donnersbergkreis district
- Interactive map of Biedesheim
- Location within Germany Location within Rhineland-Palatinate
- Coordinates: 49°36′16″N 8°6′23″E
- Country: Germany
- State: Rhineland-Palatinate
- District: Donnersbergkreis
- Municipal assoc.: Göllheim

Government
  - Mayor (2023–24): Armin Wendel

Area
  - Total: 6.32 km^{2} (2.44 sq mi)
- Elevation: 250–270 m (820–890 ft)

Population (2025-12-31)
  - Total: 623
  - Density: 98.6/km^{2} (255/sq mi)
- Time zone: UTC+01:00 (CET)
  - Summer (DST): UTC+02:00 (CEST)
- Postal codes: 67308
- Dialling codes: 06355
- Vehicle registration: KIB
- Website: www.goellheim.de

Biedesheim (German pronunciation: [ˈbiːdəshaɪm]) is a municipality in the Donnersbergkreis district, in Rhineland-Palatinate, Germany.

== Geography ==
The village is located on the upper Brübelbach stream. The nearest large cities are Worms, 22 km (14 mi) east and Kaiserslautern, 40 km (25 mi) west.

Besides the village proper, the municipality also includes the inhabited places of Neumühle and Siedlung Schönblick.

Neighbouring municipalities are Ottersheim, Kindenheim, Quirnheim, Lautersheim, Göllheim and Rüssingen.

== History ==
Biedesheim is a franconian settlement. It was first mentioned as Bosinesheim in the Lorsch Codex in 782. Later the village was called "Büdesheim" and in 1766 "Rüben-Büdesheim" to distinguish it from "Erbes-Büdesheim" near Alzey. "Rübenbüdesheim" was still used in the 19th century.

A water castle of which only a few walls survived its destruction in 1470, was located in the western part of the village.

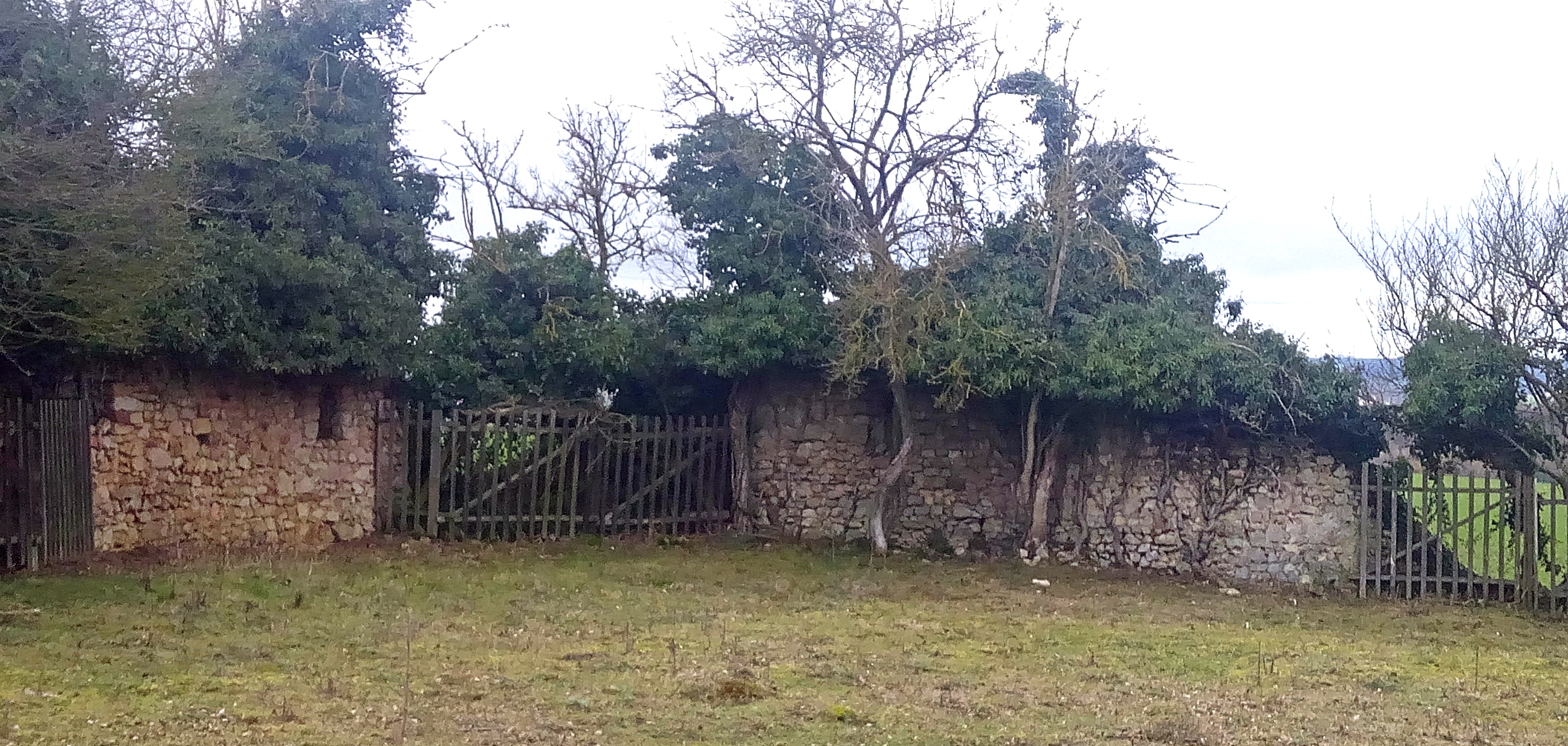
walls of the medieval castle

== Politics ==
=== Council ===
The village council is composed of 12 members who were elected in a personalized proportional representation in the local elections on June 9, 2024, and the honorary mayor as chairman.

=== Heraldry ===
The coat of arms shows a saltire and two stars.

== Culture and sights ==
=== Buildings ===
The protestant church was a romanesque building from the 10th century. It was renewed in 1498. On the inside there are splendid murals from the 13th and 15th centuries, which were uncovered in 1964. At the old cemetery around the church classicist gravestones can be found, one of the for a veteran of the Napoleonic Wars. There is also a catholic church in the village.

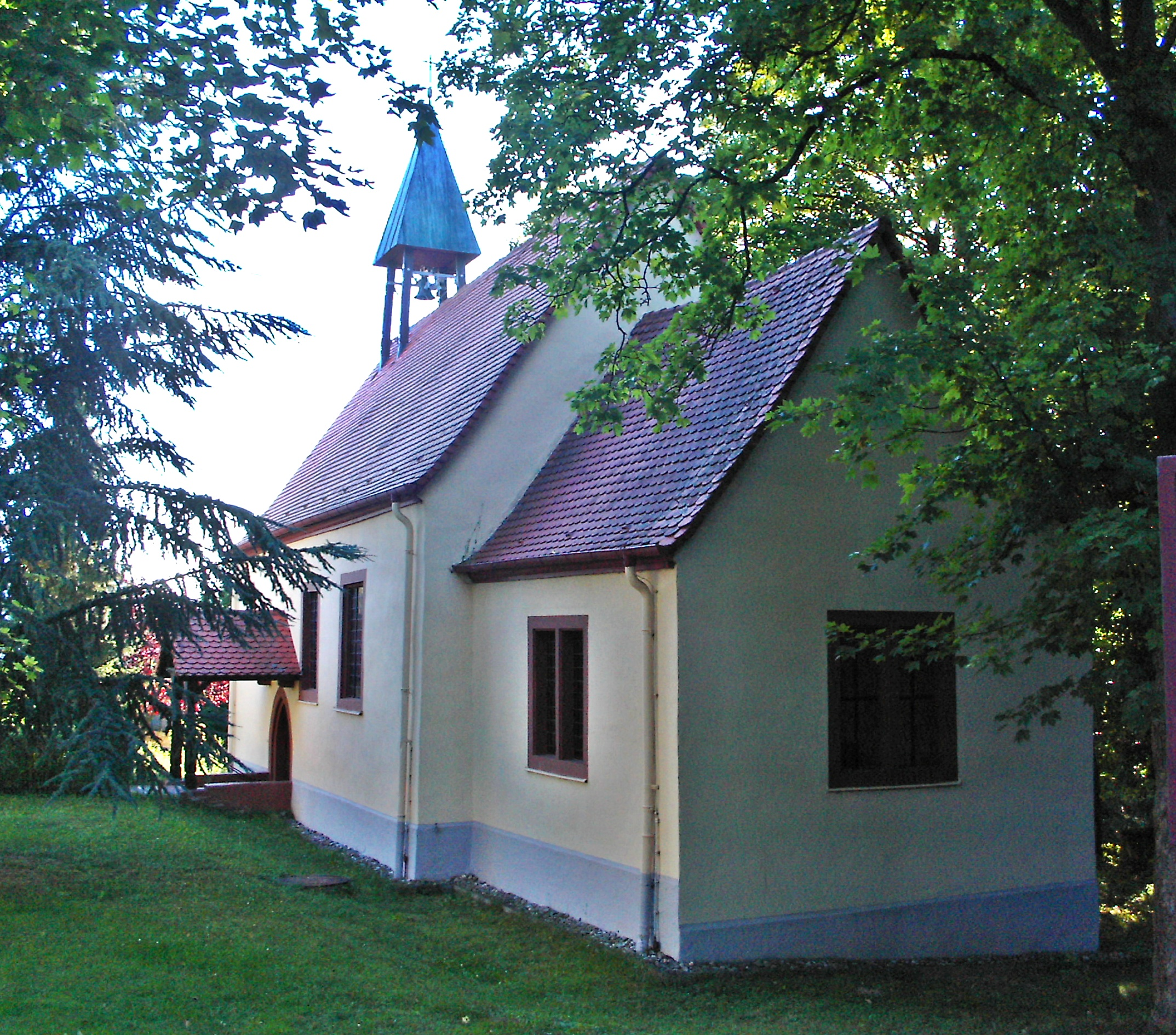
protestant church

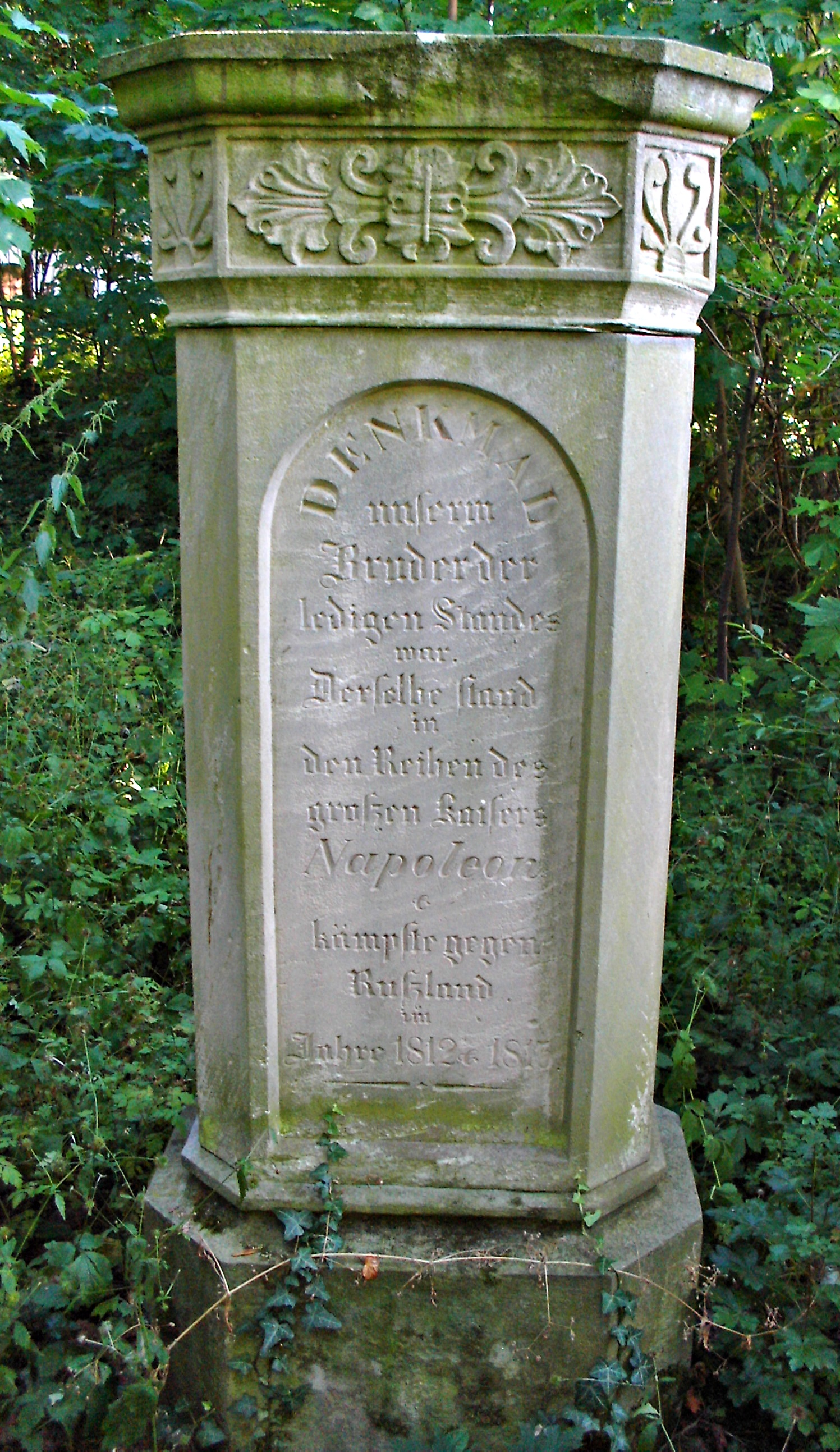
gravestone

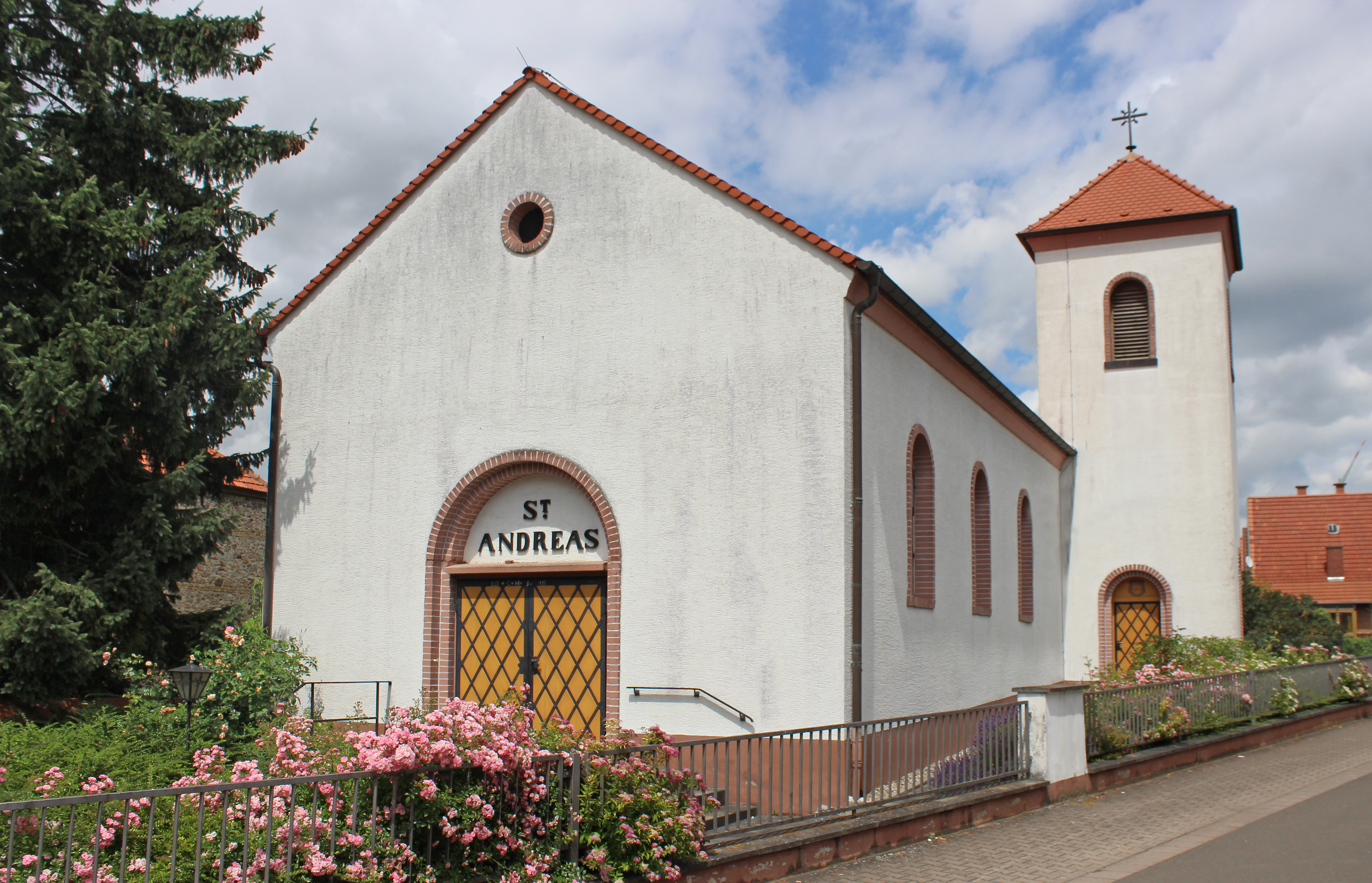
catholic church

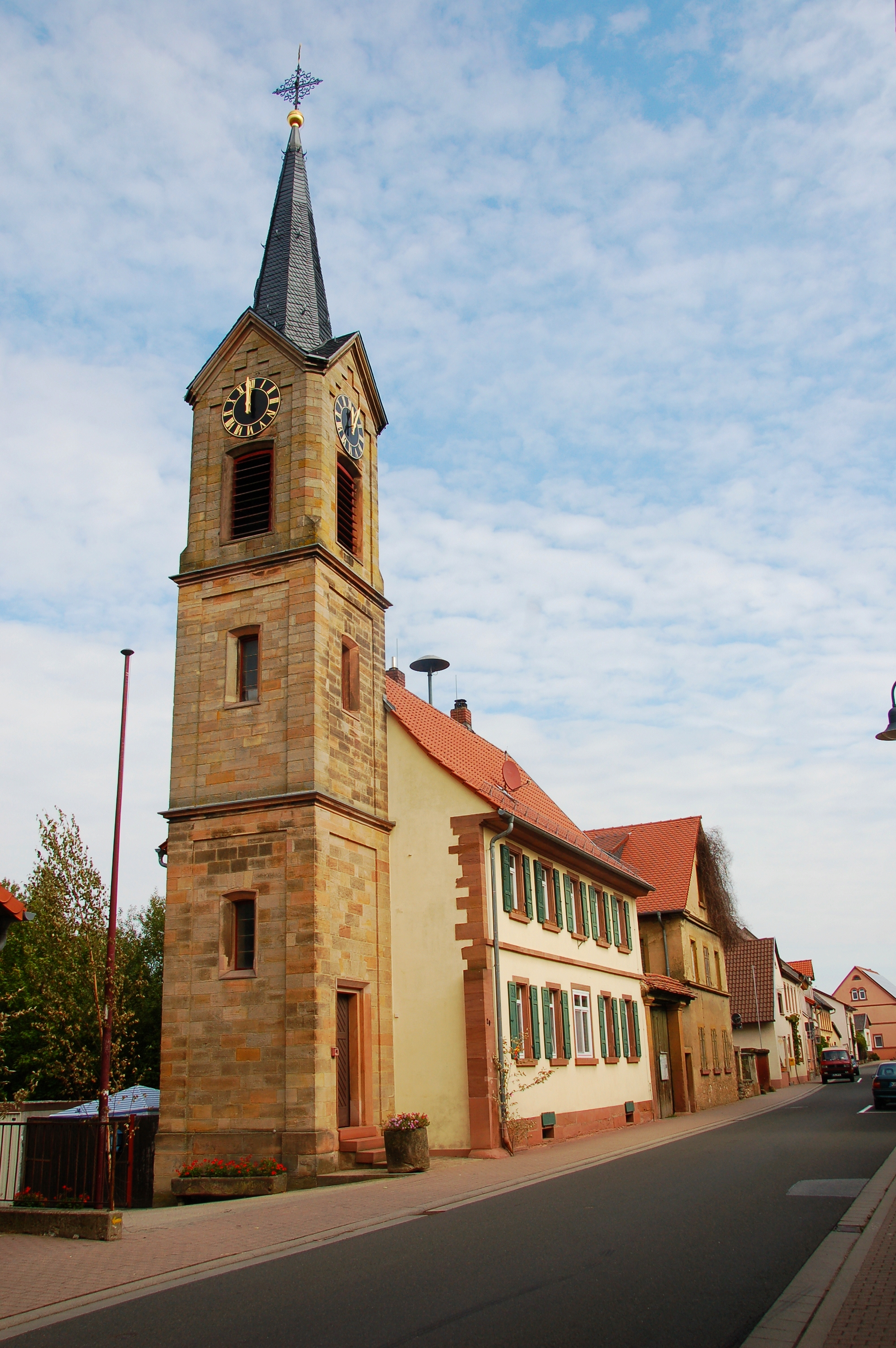
communal bell tower

=== Culture ===
The Kerwe is celebrated yearly on the third weekend in September.

== Infrastructure ==
A63 highway run 9 km (5.5 mi) west of Biedesheim. The village is served by bus line 904 of the VRN that runs from Kirchheimbolanden to Eisenberg.
