= Göllheim (Verbandsgemeinde) =

- Verbandsgemeinde
- Location of Göllheim within Donnersbergkreis district
- Interactive map of Göllheim
- Location within Germany Location within Rhineland-Palatinate
- Coordinates: 49°36′N 8°03′E
- Country: Germany
- State: Rhineland-Palatinate
- District: Donnersbergkreis
- Seat: Göllheim
- Subdivisions: 13 municipalities

Area
  - Total: 79.55 km^{2} (30.71 sq mi)

Population (2025-12-31)
  - Total: 11,894
  - Density: 149.5/km^{2} (387.2/sq mi)
- Time zone: UTC+01:00 (CET)
  - Summer (DST): UTC+02:00 (CEST)
- Website: www.vg-goellheim.de

Göllheim is a Verbandsgemeinde ("collective municipality") in the Donnersbergkreis, in Rhineland-Palatinate, Germany. The seat of the Verbandsgemeinde is in Göllheim.

The Verbandsgemeinde Göllheim consists of the following Ortsgemeinden ("local municipalities"):

1. Albisheim
2. Biedesheim
3. Bubenheim
4. Dreisen
5. Einselthum
6. Göllheim
7. Immesheim
8. Lautersheim
9. Ottersheim
10. Rüssingen
11. Standenbühl
12. Weitersweiler
13. Zellertal
