= Standenbühl =

- Municipality
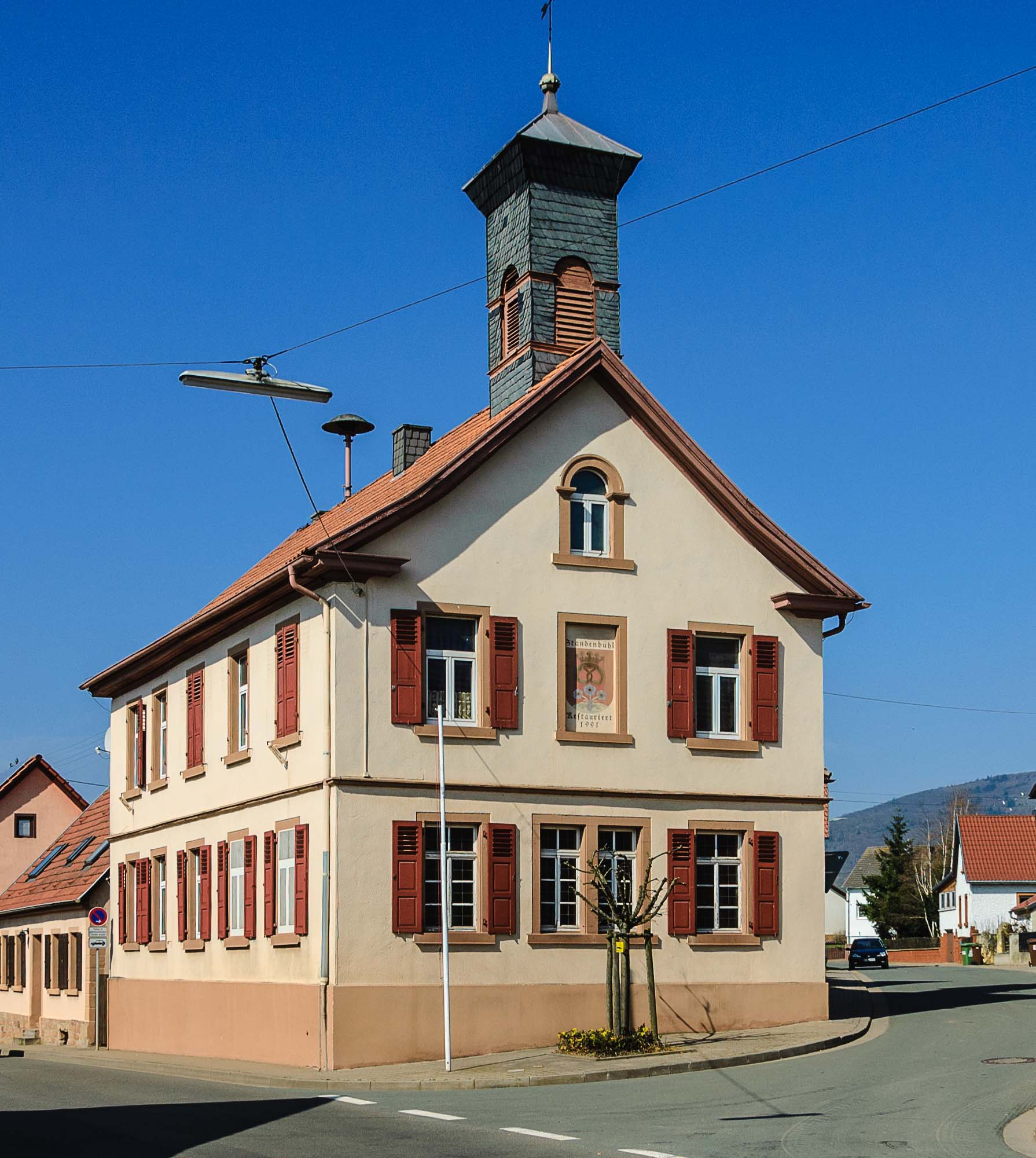
- village hall

- Coat of arms

- Location of Standenbühl within Donnersbergkreis district
- Interactive map of Standenbühl
- Location within Germany Location within Rhineland-Palatinate
- Coordinates: 49°35′40″N 07°58′59″E
- Country: Germany
- State: Rhineland-Palatinate
- District: Donnersbergkreis
- Municipal assoc.: Göllheim

Government
  - Mayor (2019–24): Georg Pohlmann

Area
  - Total: 1.25 km^{2} (0.48 sq mi)
- Elevation: 224 m (735 ft)

Population (2025-12-31)
  - Total: 187
  - Density: 150/km^{2} (387/sq mi)
- Time zone: UTC+01:00 (CET)
  - Summer (DST): UTC+02:00 (CEST)
- Postal codes: 67816
- Dialling codes: 06357
- Vehicle registration: KIB
- Website: www.goellheim.de

Standenbühl (German pronunciation: [ˈʃtandn̩byːl]) is a municipality in the Donnersbergkreis district, in Rhineland-Palatinate, Germany.
