= Alzey Hills =

Coordinates: 49°41′N 8°9′E

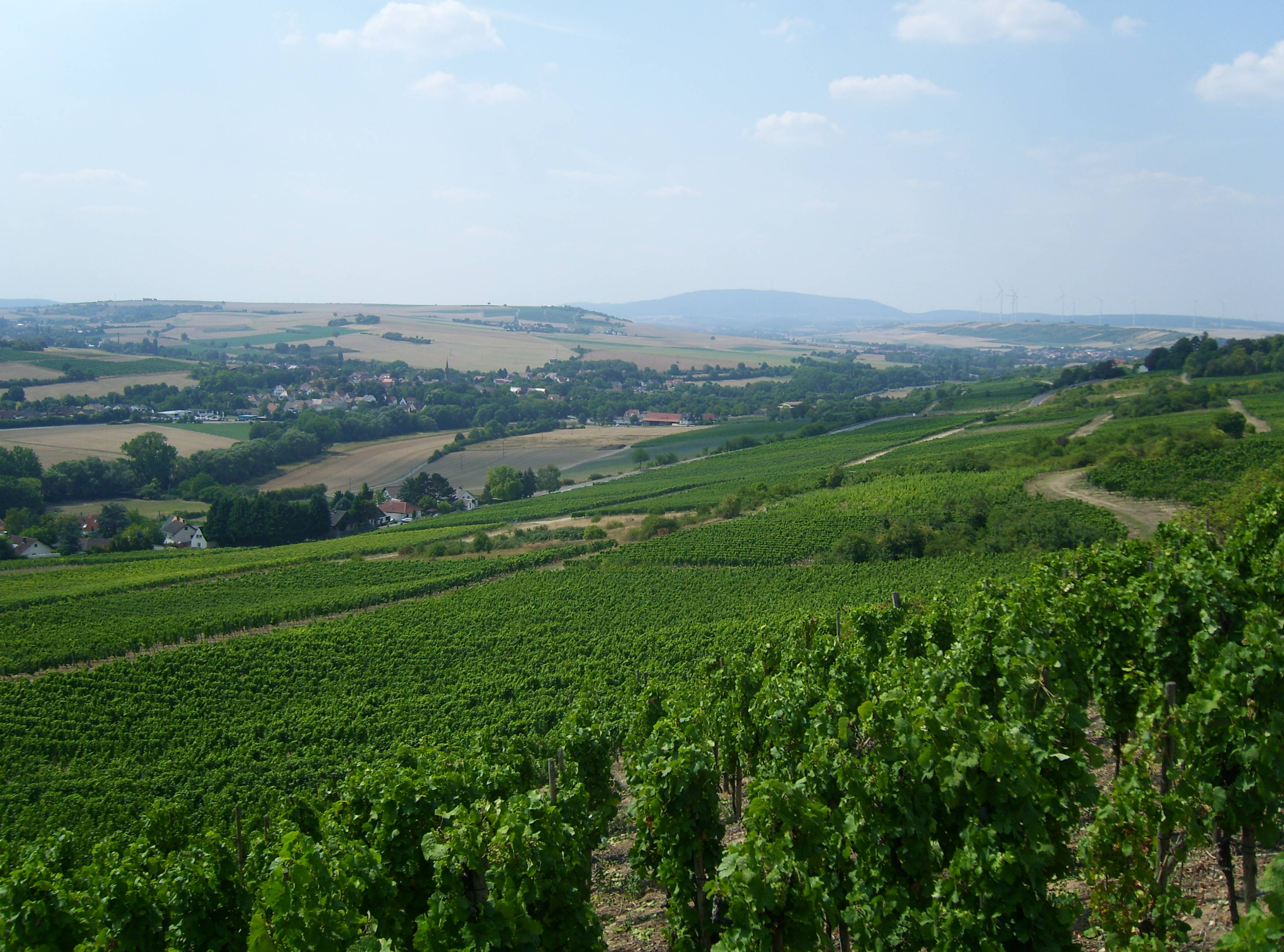

The Alzey Hills (German: Alzeyer Hügelland) form a region of low, rolling hills, or Hügelland, 275 km^{2} in area and up to 337 m above sea level (NHN), in Rhenish Hesse in the German state of Rhineland-Palatinate. From a natural region perspective they are part of the Upper Rhine Plain and classed as major unit no. 227.

== Geography ==
The Alzey Hills, which belong to the northern part of the Upper Rhine Plain, lie in the east of the state of Rhineland-Palatinate within the counties of Alzey-Worms and Donnersbergkreis. To the south they run into the Rhenish Hesse Hills and to the east into the Palatine Uplands. To the east they extend as far as the Wonnegau.

The hills, which derive their name from the town of Alzey in the north, lie roughly between Wörrstadt in the north, Alsheim in the northeast, Westhofen and Monsheim in the east, Grünstadt in the southeast, Wattenheim in the south, Eisenberg in the southwest and Kirchheimbolanden in the south.

== Description ==
The Alzey Hills, which are covered by loess, lime and marl-rich soils, are dominated by agriculture. In many areas it is a cultural landscape used, particularly on the southern slopes of the hills, for viticulture and, especially in the south, for arable farming. It is part of the foreland for the Palatine Uplands with sharper relief that the Rhenish Hesse Hills to the north. In the west, in the transition zone to the Palatine Uplands, the Alzey Hills are wooded in places.

Amongst the hills of the region that descends from west to east from heights of over 300 m above sea level (NN) to around 120 m above NN (near Westhofen), are the Zollstock (300.3 m; between Immesheim and Rüssingen), the Saukopf (296.4 m; near Immesheim), the Kahlenberg (305 m; near Kindenheim) and the ridge of Gerstenberg with the Quirnheimer Berg (316.6 m; near Quirnheim). The hills are bisected by the upper reaches of the Selz and the Seebach and the middle courses of the Pfrimm and the Eisbach.
