= Einselthum =

- Municipality
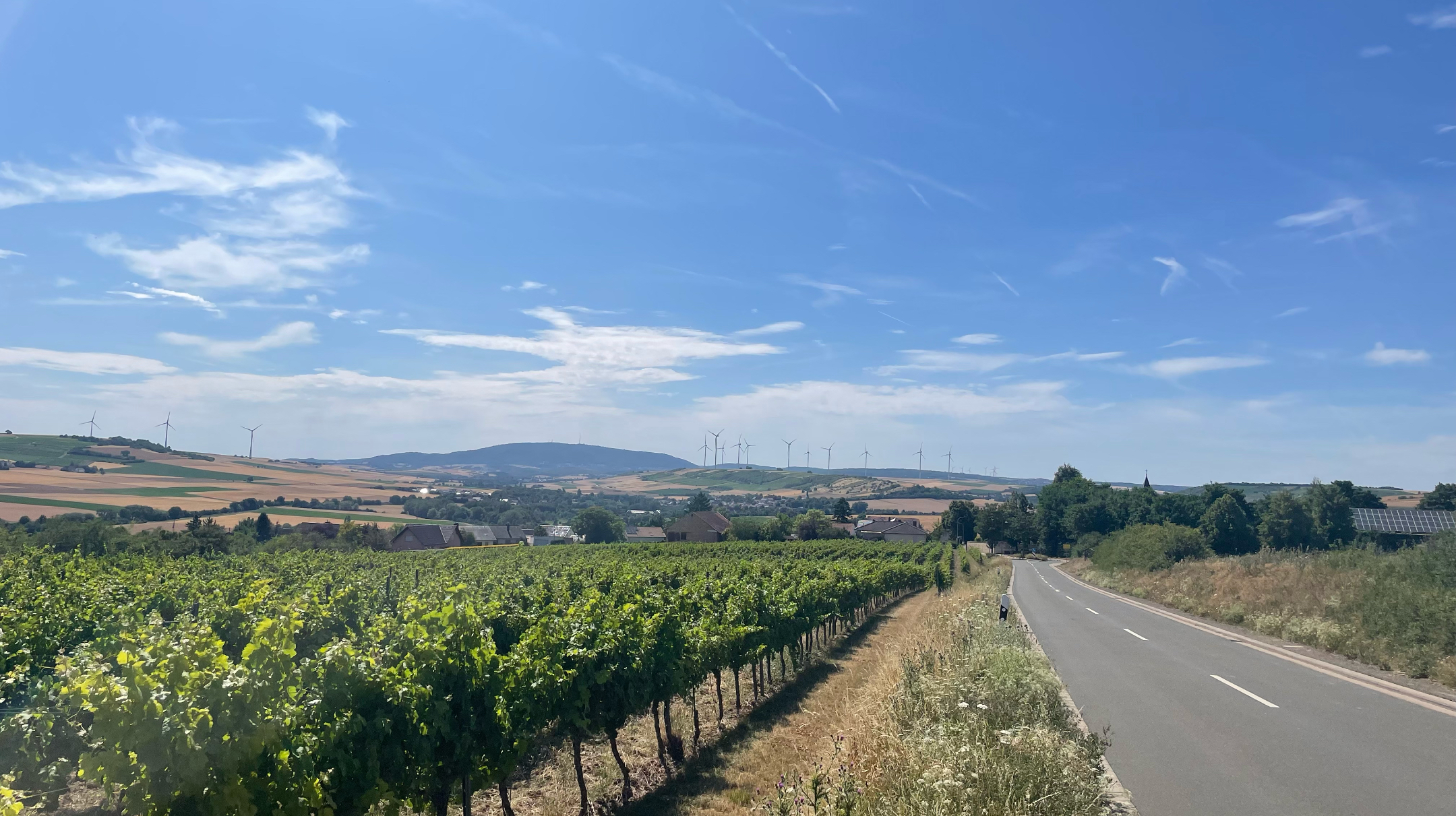
- View of Einselthum with the Pfrimm valley and Donnersberg mountain in the background

- Coat of arms

- Location of Einselthum within Donnersbergkreis district
- Interactive map of Einselthum
- Location within Germany Location within Rhineland-Palatinate
- Coordinates: 49°39′06″N 08°07′28″E
- Country: Germany
- State: Rhineland-Palatinate
- District: Donnersbergkreis
- Municipal assoc.: Göllheim

Government
  - Mayor (2019–24): Simone Rühl-Pfeiffer

Area
  - Total: 5.51 km^{2} (2.13 sq mi)
- Elevation: 165 m (541 ft)

Population (2025-12-31)
  - Total: 782
  - Density: 142/km^{2} (368/sq mi)
- Time zone: UTC+01:00 (CET)
  - Summer (DST): UTC+02:00 (CEST)
- Postal codes: 67308
- Dialling codes: 06355
- Vehicle registration: KIB
- Website: www.einselthum.de

Einselthum is a municipality in the Donnersbergkreis district, in Rhineland-Palatinate, Germany.
