= Bubenheim =

- Municipality
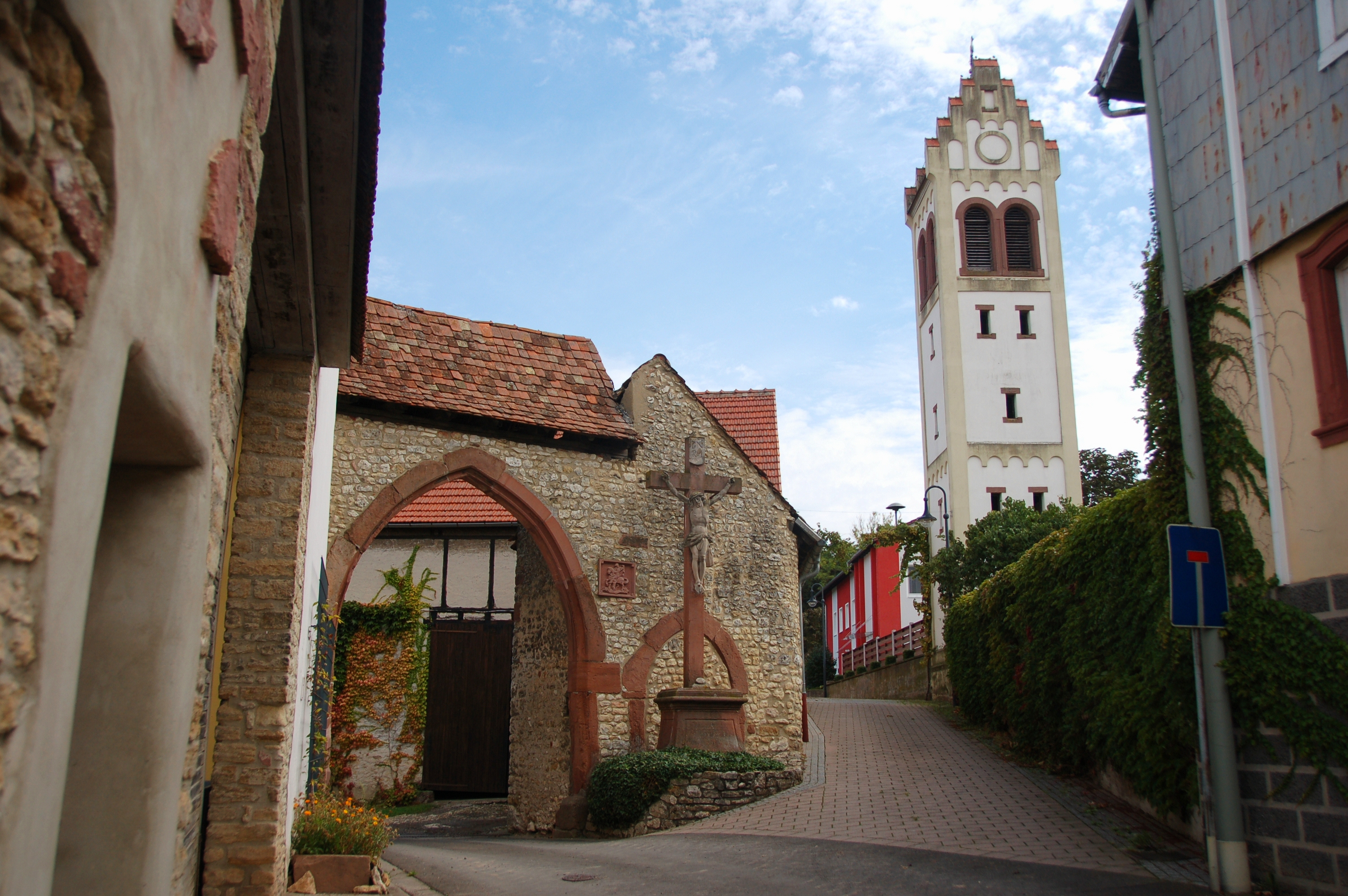
- village center

- Coat of arms

- Location of Bubenheim within Donnersbergkreis district
- Interactive map of Bubenheim
- Location within Germany Location within Rhineland-Palatinate
- Coordinates: 49°37′39″N 8°7′05″E
- Country: Germany
- State: Rhineland-Palatinate
- District: Donnersbergkreis
- Municipal assoc.: Göllheim

Government
  - Mayor (2019–24): Thomas Lebkücher

Area
  - Total: 2.94 km^{2} (1.14 sq mi)
- Elevation: 200 m (660 ft)

Population (2025-12-31)
  - Total: 418
  - Density: 142/km^{2} (368/sq mi)
- Time zone: UTC+01:00 (CET)
  - Summer (DST): UTC+02:00 (CEST)
- Postal codes: 67308
- Dialling codes: 06355
- Vehicle registration: KIB
- Website: www.bubenheim-pfalz.de

Bubenheim (German pronunciation: [ˈbuːbn̩haɪm]) is a municipality in the Donnersbergkreis district, in Rhineland-Palatinate, Germany. Bubenheim has an area of 2.94 km² and a population of 419 (as of December 31, 2020).

== Geography ==
The village is located between Worms and Kaiserslautern in the valley of the Ammelbach stream. Besides the village proper the inhabited places Borkensteinermühle, Dörrmühle and Kalkwerk (lime works) are part of the municipality.

The most famous local building is St. Peter‘s church, the oldest romanesque village church in the Palatinate with roots spanning back to the 10th century.
