= Weitersweiler =

- Municipality
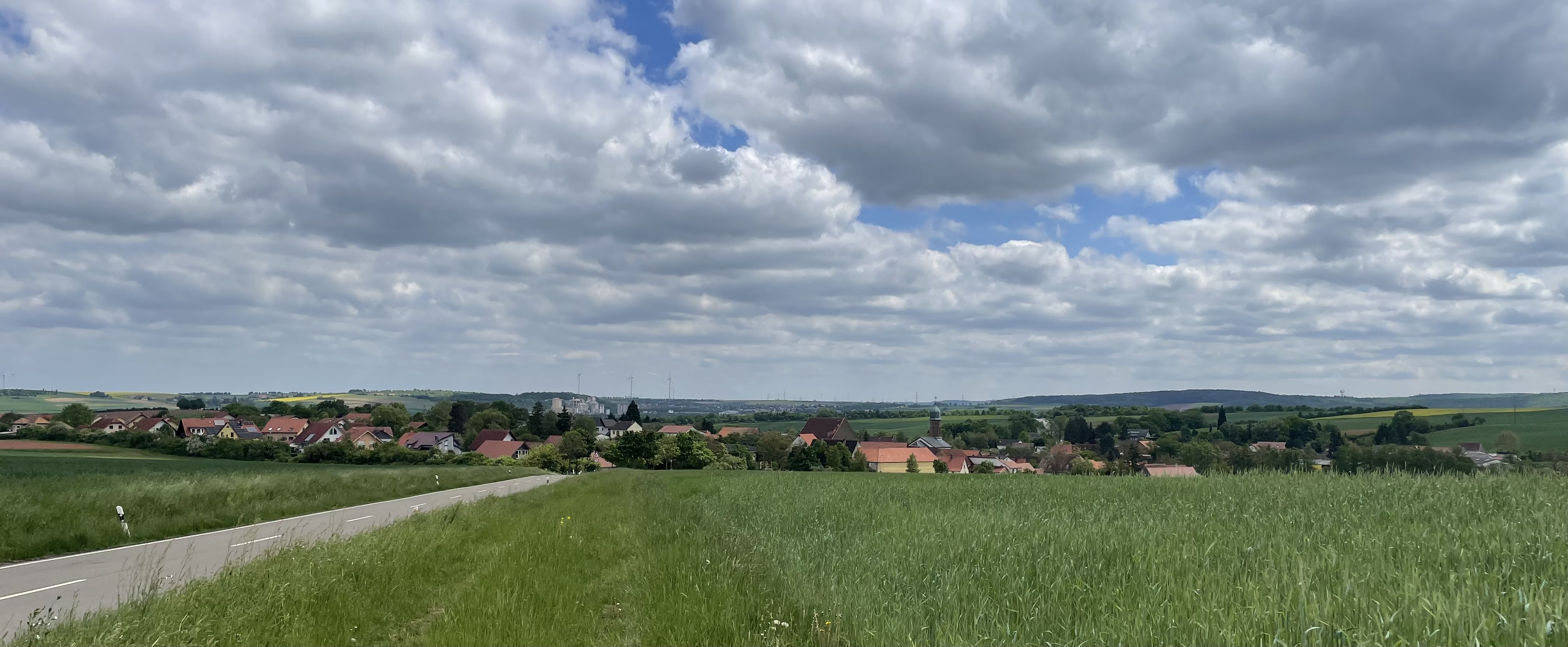

- Coat of arms

- Location of Weitersweiler within Donnersbergkreis district
- Interactive map of Weitersweiler
- Location within Germany Location within Rhineland-Palatinate
- Coordinates: 49°36′56″N 07°59′48″E
- Country: Germany
- State: Rhineland-Palatinate
- District: Donnersbergkreis
- Municipal assoc.: Göllheim

Government
  - Mayor (2019–24): Thomas Busch

Area
  - Total: 4.52 km^{2} (1.75 sq mi)
- Elevation: 232 m (761 ft)

Population (2025-12-31)
  - Total: 511
  - Density: 113/km^{2} (293/sq mi)
- Time zone: UTC+01:00 (CET)
  - Summer (DST): UTC+02:00 (CEST)
- Postal codes: 67808
- Dialling codes: 06357
- Vehicle registration: KIB
- Website: www.goellheim.de

Weitersweiler (German pronunciation: [ˈvaɪtɐsvaɪlɐ]) is a municipality in the Donnersbergkreis district, in Rhineland-Palatinate, Germany.
