= Dreisen =

- Municipality
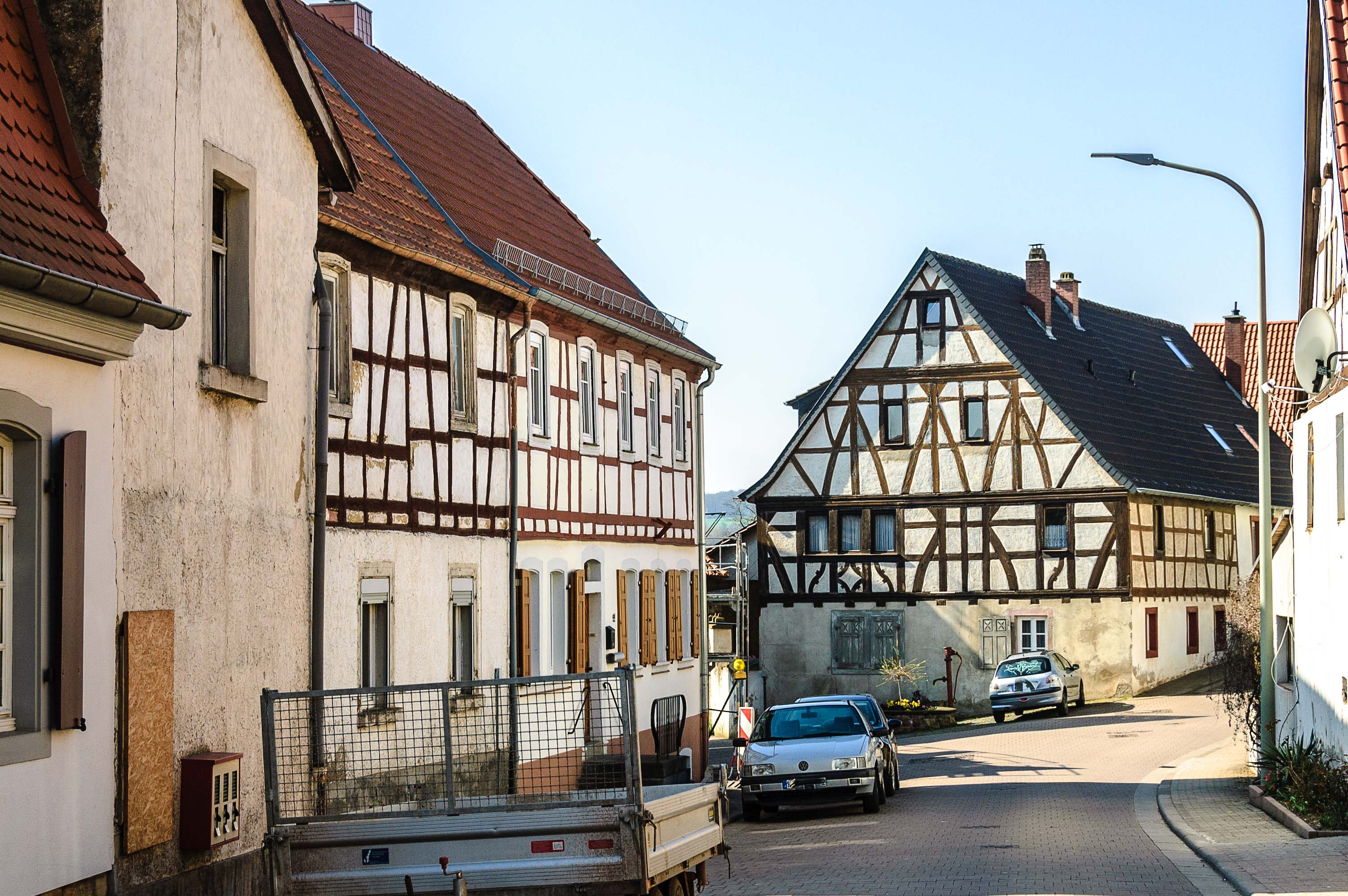
- Schulstraße

- Coat of arms

- Location of Dreisen within Donnersbergkreis district
- Interactive map of Dreisen
- Location within Germany Location within Rhineland-Palatinate
- Coordinates: 49°36′07″N 8°0′49″E
- Country: Germany
- State: Rhineland-Palatinate
- District: Donnersbergkreis
- Municipal assoc.: Göllheim

Government
  - Mayor (2019–24): Kathrin Molter

Area
  - Total: 9.03 km^{2} (3.49 sq mi)
- Elevation: 210 m (690 ft)

Population (2025-12-31)
  - Total: 945
  - Density: 105/km^{2} (271/sq mi)
- Time zone: UTC+01:00 (CET)
  - Summer (DST): UTC+02:00 (CEST)
- Postal codes: 67816
- Dialling codes: 06357
- Vehicle registration: KIB
- Website: www.vg-goellheim.de

Dreisen (German pronunciation: [ˈdʁaɪzn̩]) is a municipality in the Donnersbergkreis district, in Rhineland-Palatinate, Germany.
