= Immesheim =

- Municipality
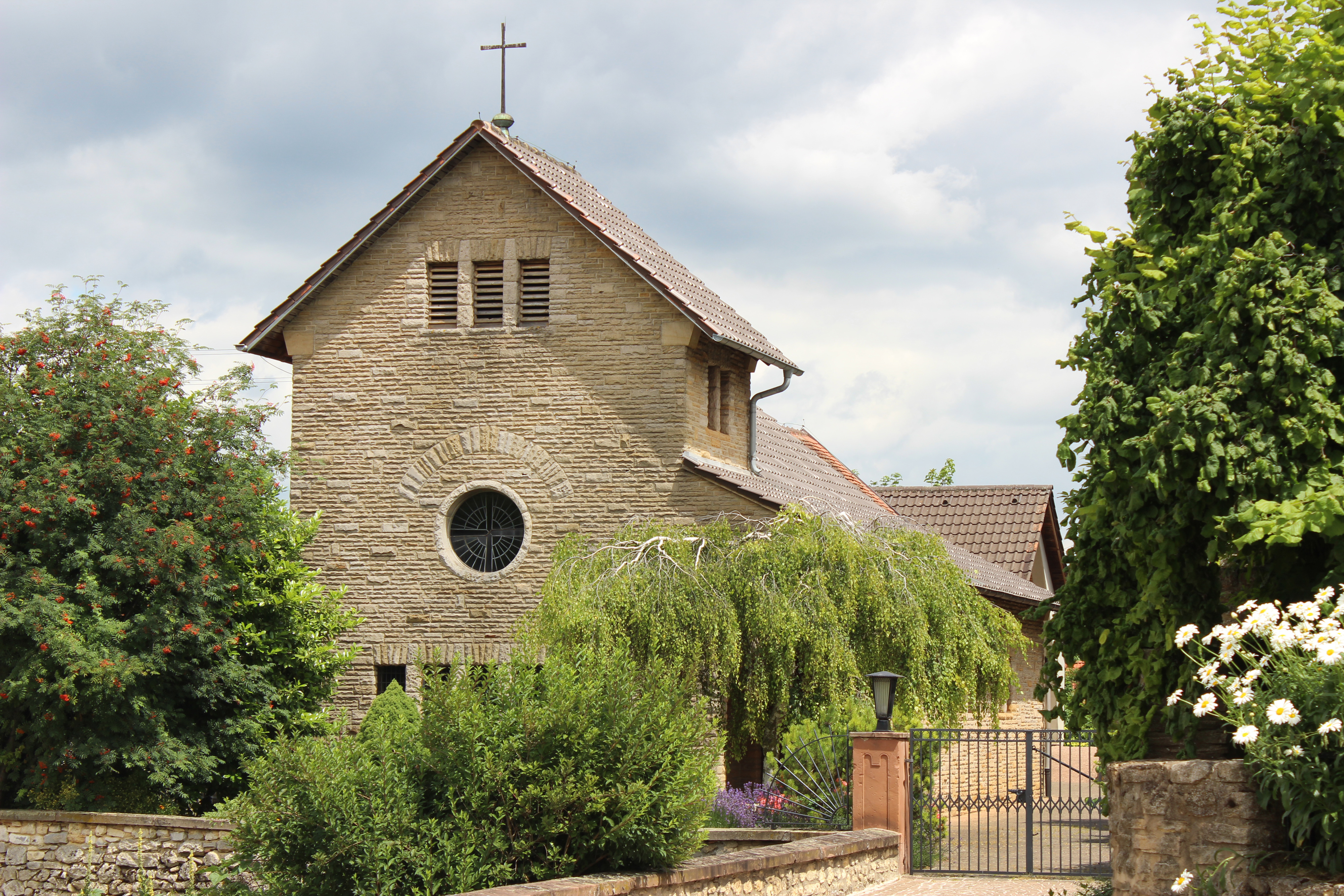
- Saint Bartholomew's catholic church

- Coat of arms

- Location of Immesheim within Donnersbergkreis district
- Interactive map of Immesheim
- Location within Germany Location within Rhineland-Palatinate
- Coordinates: 49°38′17″N 8°6′20″E
- Country: Germany
- State: Rhineland-Palatinate
- District: Donnersbergkreis
- Municipal assoc.: Göllheim

Government
  - Mayor (2019–24): Kurt Kauk

Area
  - Total: 2.99 km^{2} (1.15 sq mi)
- Elevation: 198 m (650 ft)

Population (2025-12-31)
  - Total: 129
  - Density: 43.1/km^{2} (112/sq mi)
- Time zone: UTC+01:00 (CET)
  - Summer (DST): UTC+02:00 (CEST)
- Postal codes: 67308
- Dialling codes: 06355
- Vehicle registration: KIB
- Website: goellheim.de

Immesheim (German pronunciation: [ˈɪməshaɪm]) is a municipality in the Donnersbergkreis district, in Rhineland-Palatinate, Germany.
