= Eisenberg, Rhineland-Palatinate =

Eisenberg
- Town
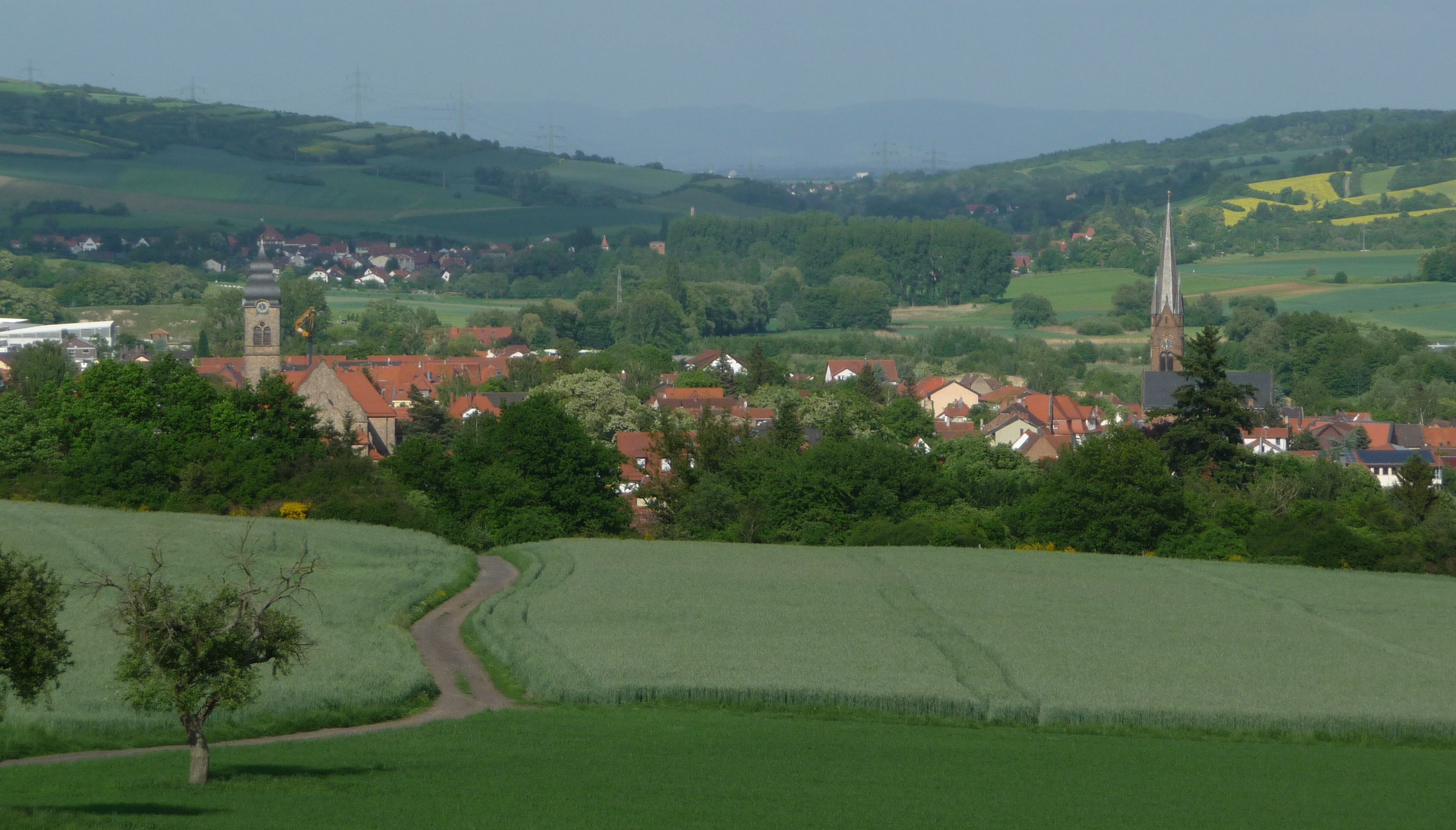

- Coat of arms

- Location of Eisenberg within Donnersbergkreis district
- Interactive map of Eisenberg
- Location within Germany Location within Rhineland-Palatinate
- Coordinates: 49°33′41″N 8°04′21″E
- Country: Germany
- State: Rhineland-Palatinate
- District: Donnersbergkreis
- Municipal assoc.: Eisenberg (Pfalz)

Government
  - Mayor (2019–24): Peter Funck (FW)

Area
  - Total: 18.75 km^{2} (7.24 sq mi)
- Elevation: 183 m (600 ft)

Population (2025-12-31)
  - Total: 9,094
  - Density: 485.0/km^{2} (1,256/sq mi)
- Time zone: UTC+01:00 (CET)
  - Summer (DST): UTC+02:00 (CEST)
- Postal codes: 67304
- Dialling codes: 06351
- Vehicle registration: KIB
- Website: www.eisenberg.de

Eisenberg (German pronunciation: [ˈaɪzn̩bɛʁk]) is the largest town in the Donnersbergkreis, in Rhineland-Palatinate, Germany.

Eisenberg is the seat of the Verbandsgemeinde ("collective municipality") Eisenberg.

The name indicates ancient iron mining (Eisen = iron; -berg = hill/mountain). Even more important is the extraction of clay and Klebsand.

== Geography ==
=== Location ===
Eisenberg is located in the North Palatinate in the south-eastern part of Donnersbergkreis district of which it is the largest municipality by population. Worms is about 25 km (16 mi) to the north-east, Kaiserslautern 30 km (19 mi) to the west and Mannheim 40 km (25 mi) to the south-east. Neighbouring municipalities are Kerzenheim, Ebertsheim, Tiefenthal, Hettenleidelheim, Wattenheim and Ramsen.

=== Subdivisions ===
Besides the town itself the villages of Stauf (incorporated in 1962) and Steinborn, as well as the inhabited places of Abendthal, Erlenhof, Lauberhof, Ochsenbusch, Seltenbach und SOS-Kinderdorf belong to the municipality.

=== Geology ===
The eponymous Eisenberger Becken (Eisenberg basin) in which the town is located is enclosed by the Alzey Hills, Göllheim Hills and the Grünstadter Berg (en.: Grünstadt mountain) to the north and east. To the south and west the Stumpfwald and the Leininger Sporn, both part of the Palatinate Forest, surround the basin.

The Eisenberg Basin is a sunken floe of Buntsandstein. Because of this the basin can be seen as part of the Palatinate Forest but due to the deposits from the Tertiary and Quaternary, as well as its climate, use and topology it is regarded as part of the Rhenish-Hessian Hills.

Klebsand and fire-resistant clay can be found in the basin's center. Their mining has had a large impact on the landscape.

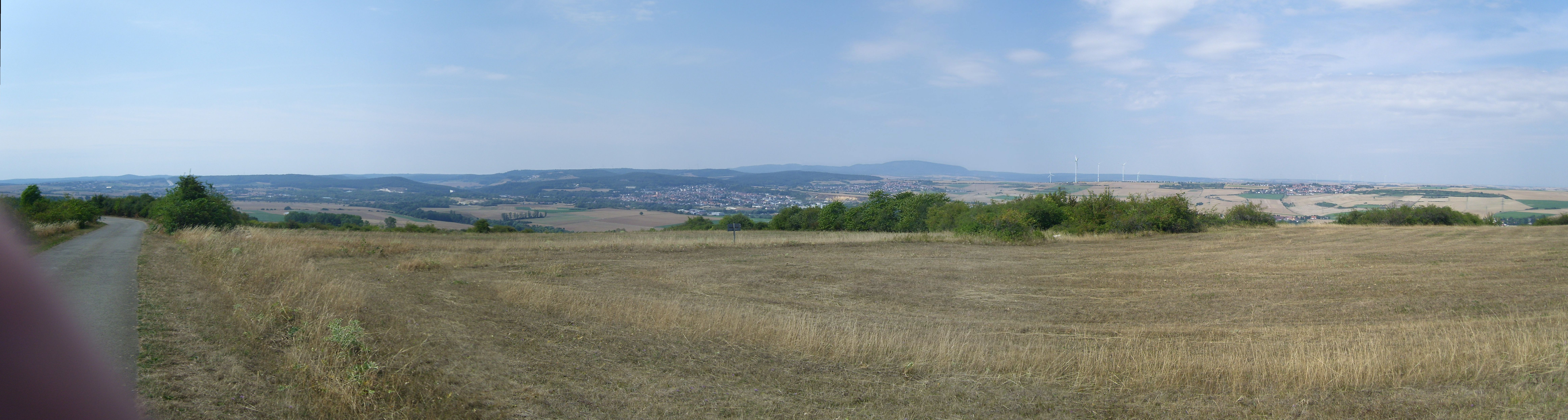
View of the Eisenberg basin, Donnersberg in the background

== History ==
The Romans had already settled the area of the town. A vicus was found on the bypass road near the border with Hettenleidelheim. It is said to be identical with Rufiniana (gr.: Ρουφινιάνα), a settlement of the Nemetes, mentioned by Ptolemy. Eisenberg's first mention in medieval times was as Ysinberc in 763.

From the 14th century onwards Eisenberg was part of the Dominion of Kirchheim that was ruled by the House of Nassau as part of the Duchy of Nassau-Weilburg.

After the War of the First Coalition Eisenberg was occupied and later annexed by France with the Treaty of Campo Formio in 1797. From 1798 to 1814 it belonged to the French Departement du Mont-Tonnerre. After the Congress of Vienna the region was first given to Austria (1815) and later to Bavaria (1816).

After World War II Eisenberg became part of Rhineland-Palatinate (1946). On 15 March 1963 the municipality was granted town privileges. Since 1969 it belongs to the Donnersbergkreis district.

== Politics ==
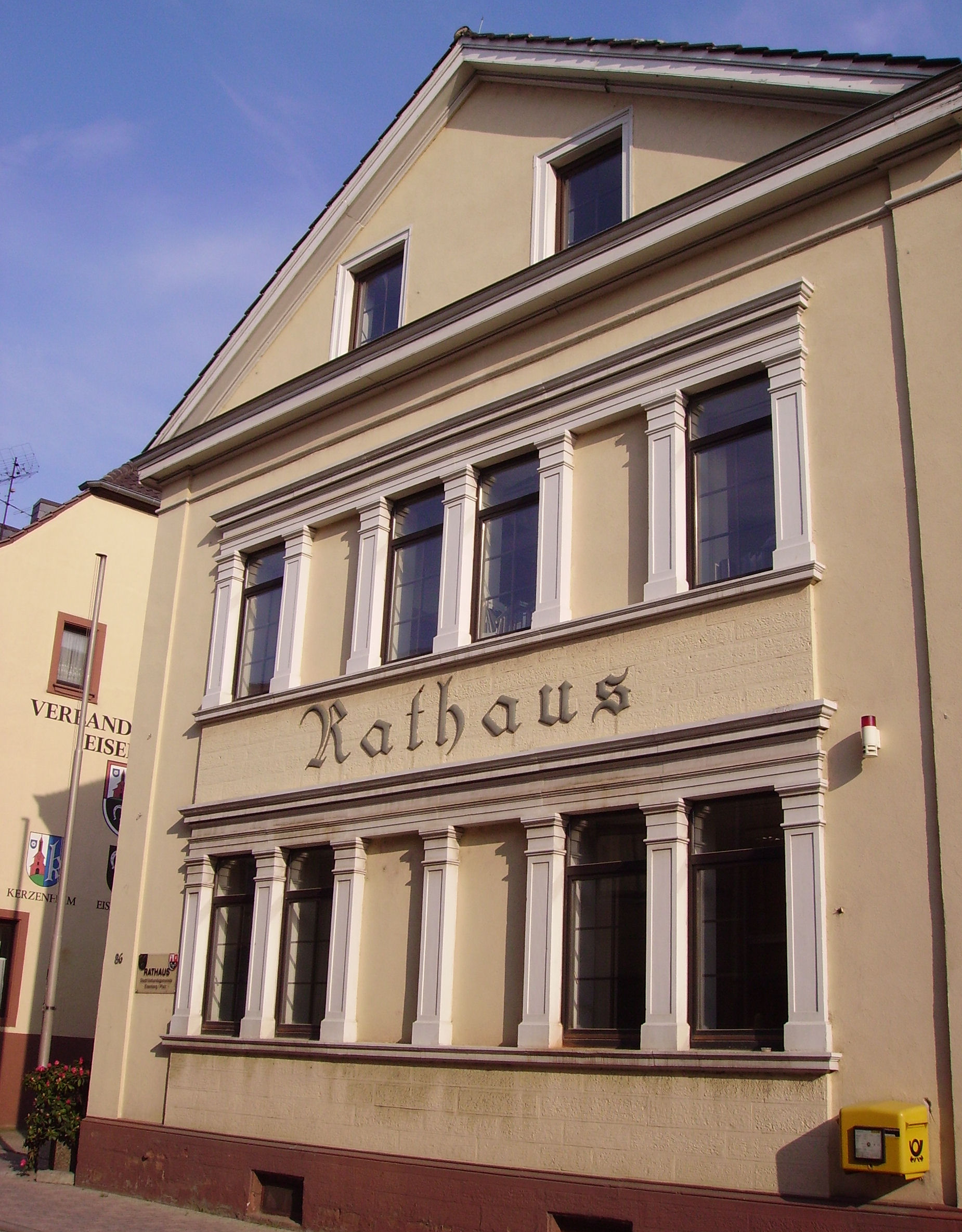
city hall

=== Council ===
The city council is composed of 24 members who were elected in a personalized proportional representation in the local elections on June 9, 2024, and the honorary mayor as chairman.

no-frame

- SPD: 8 seats
- FW: 10 seats
- FDP: 1 seats
- CDU: 5 seats

=== Heraldry ===
The coat of arms shows three argent horseshoes on a sable background. The horseshoe as a symbol can be traced back 15th century and can be seen in the oldest surviving seal from 1622. In the 17th century the number of horseshoes was increased to three. The current coat of arms was granted in 1844 by Ludwig I of Bavaria in the colours of the Teutonic Order (black and white) which had properties in Eisenberg.

=== Sister cities ===
- Sanvignes-les-Mines, Burgundy, France
- Baldock, North Hertfordshire, United Kingdom

== Religion ==
The confessional make-up of the town population on 31 March 2024 was as follows:

- 29.3% protestant
- 16.3% catholic
- 54.4% other/no religion

=== Christianity ===
In the 16th century the protestant village had its own parish that included neighbouring Hettenheim. Today the protestants are part of the Evangelical Church of the Palatinate. The catholics belong to the Diocese of Speyer and are managed by the parish in Hettenleidelheim.

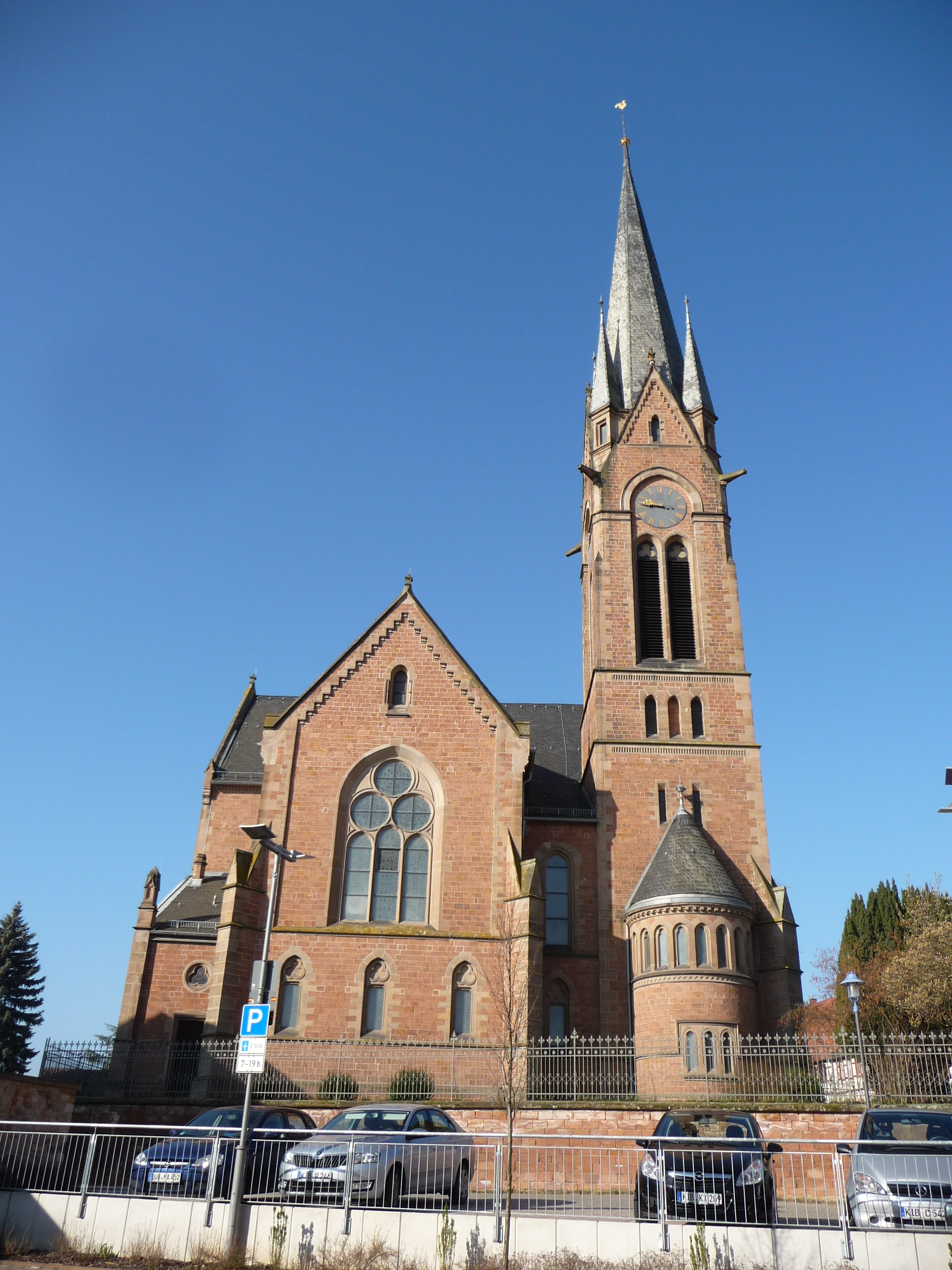
protestant church

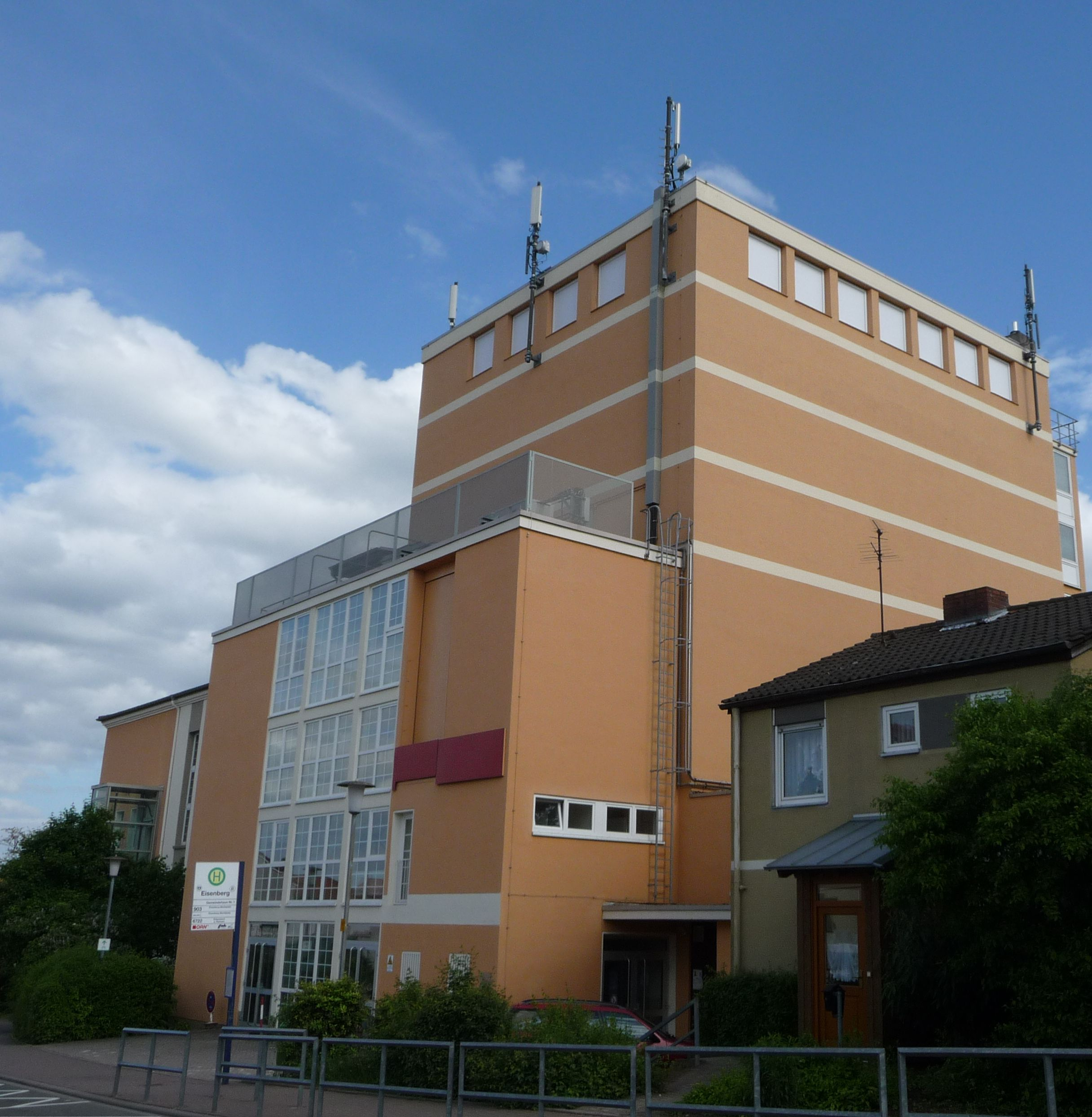
protestant community center

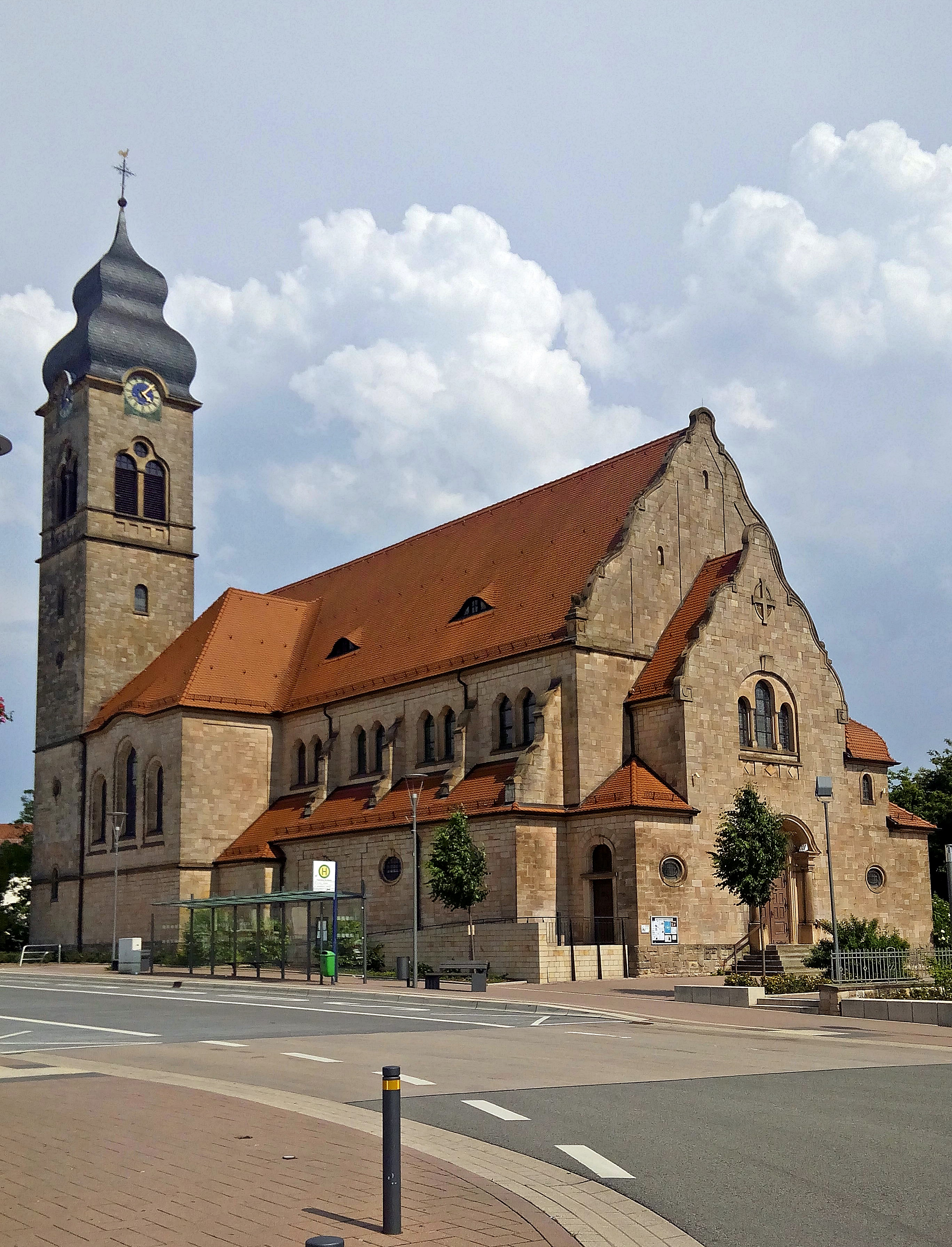
catholic church

=== Judaism ===
Eisenberg once had a synagogue.

=== Islam ===
The local mosque is managed by DITIB.

== Sights and culture ==
=== Sights ===
==== Protected buildings ====
Stauf Castle, Gienanth iron works and Wormser Straße are protected architectural ensembles.

There are several other protected buildings such as the former station building.

==== Other buildings ====
Stauf has a bell tower built in 1984 to replace a steel one built in 1950, which was already the replacement for an even older wooden one. It has two bells.

In the town center the Storchenturm (stork tower) a replica of a watch tower can be found. Far from the town but in its district the hunting residence of NS-politician Josef Bürckel can be found.

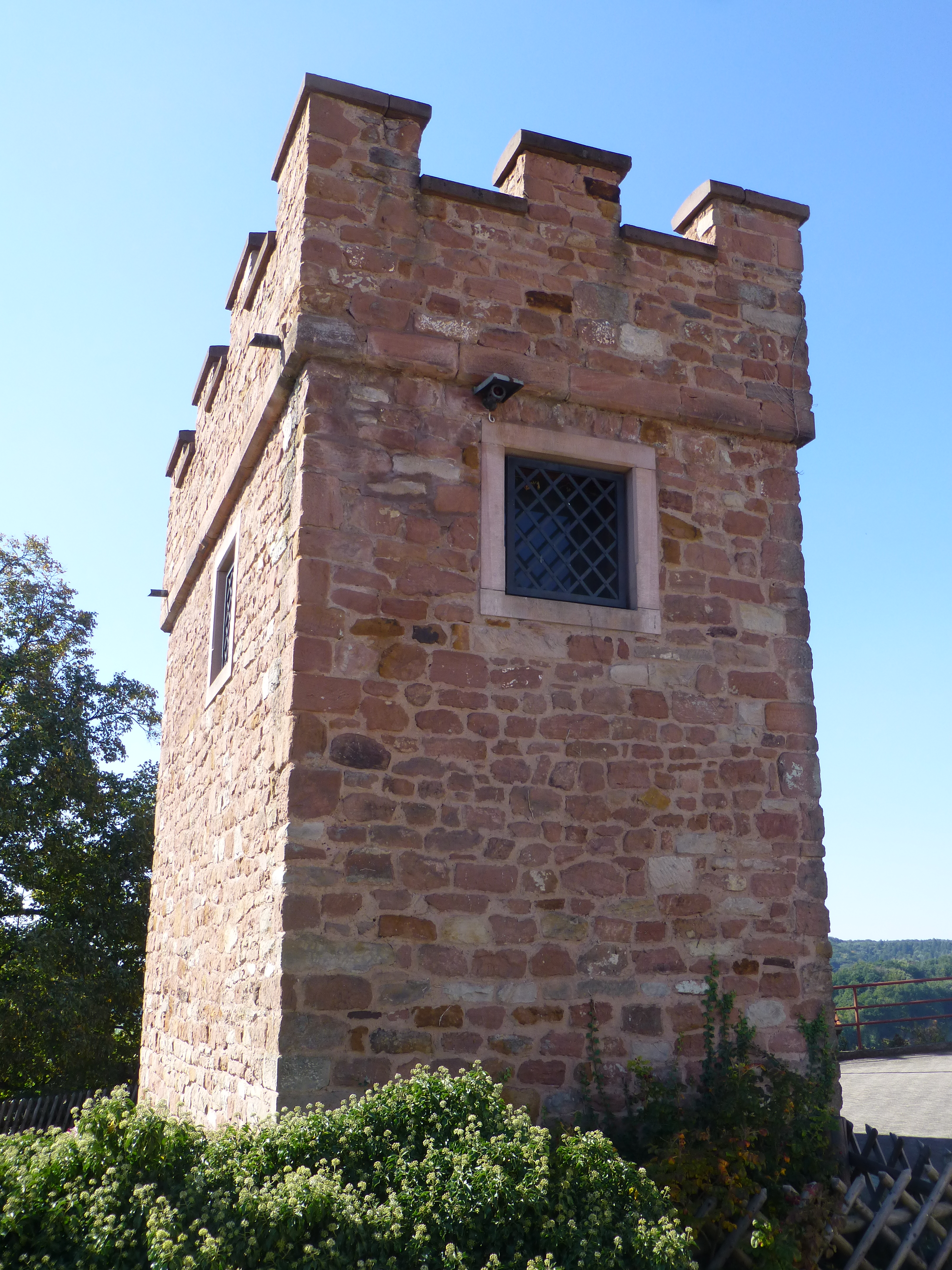
bell tower in Stauf

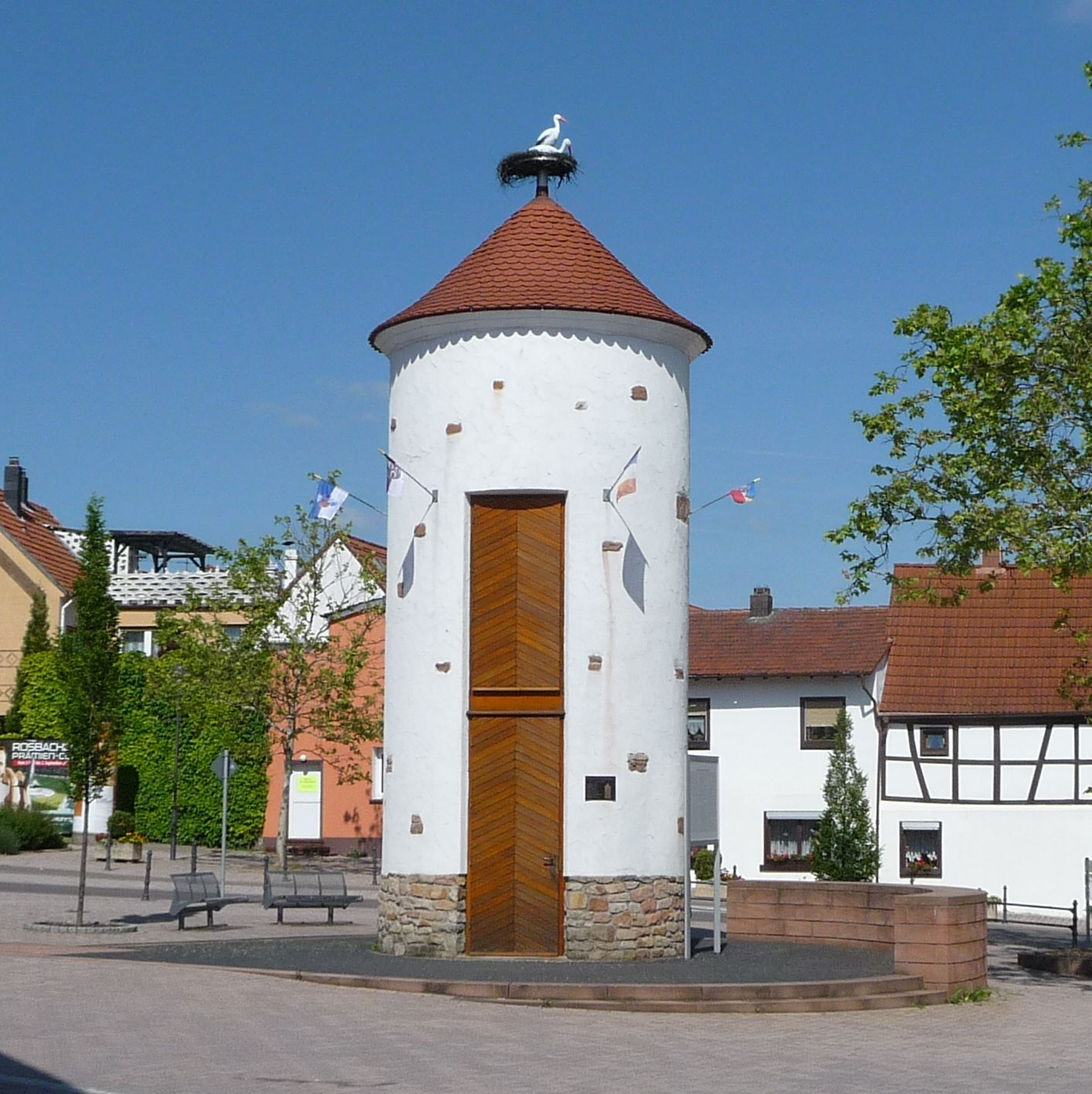
Storchenturm

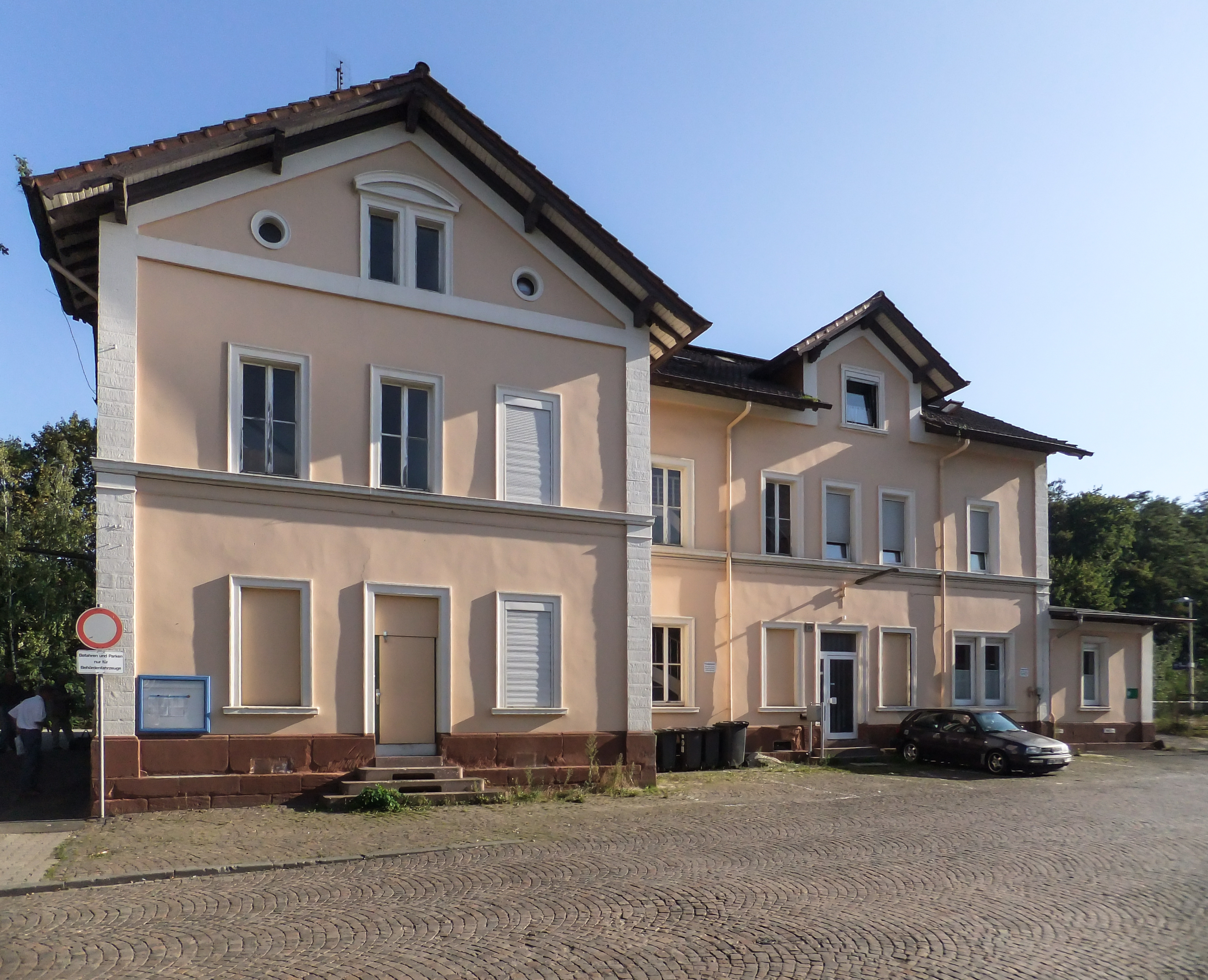
station building

==== Nature ====
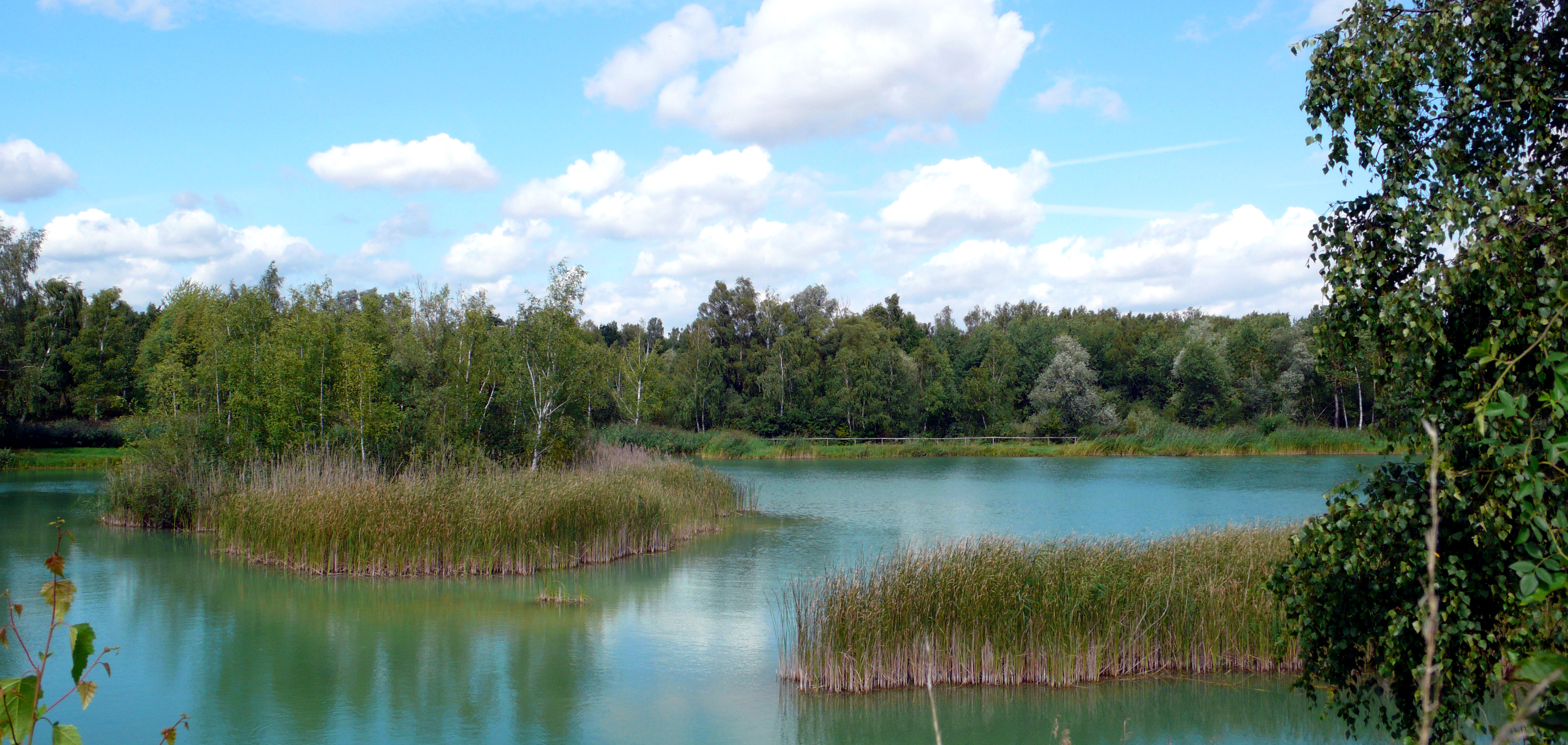
Erdekaut protected landscape

The western district is part of the Palatinate Forest Nature Park which belongs to the larger Palatinate Forest-North Vosges Biosphere Reserve. An oak tree in Steinborn and two sweet chestnut trees near Lauberhof are listed as natural monuments. South of the city proper the Erdekaut is located, once a clay pit it is now a protected landscape.

=== Culture ===
==== Legend of the "Undecayable Hand" ====
Inside the protestant church a mummified hand can be found. It is said that one day two forest owners west of Eisenberg argued about the boundary between their properties. A forester, who was an expert on the topic, was called to resolve the dispute independently. He was bribed by one of the two men and the court, trusting the foresters expertise, ruled in his favour. The forester had sworn a perjury. After he died they buried him but at the funeral his hand, which he had sworn the perjury with, burst through the coffin and they were unable to bury it. His hand was cut of and held as a souvenir that never decays.

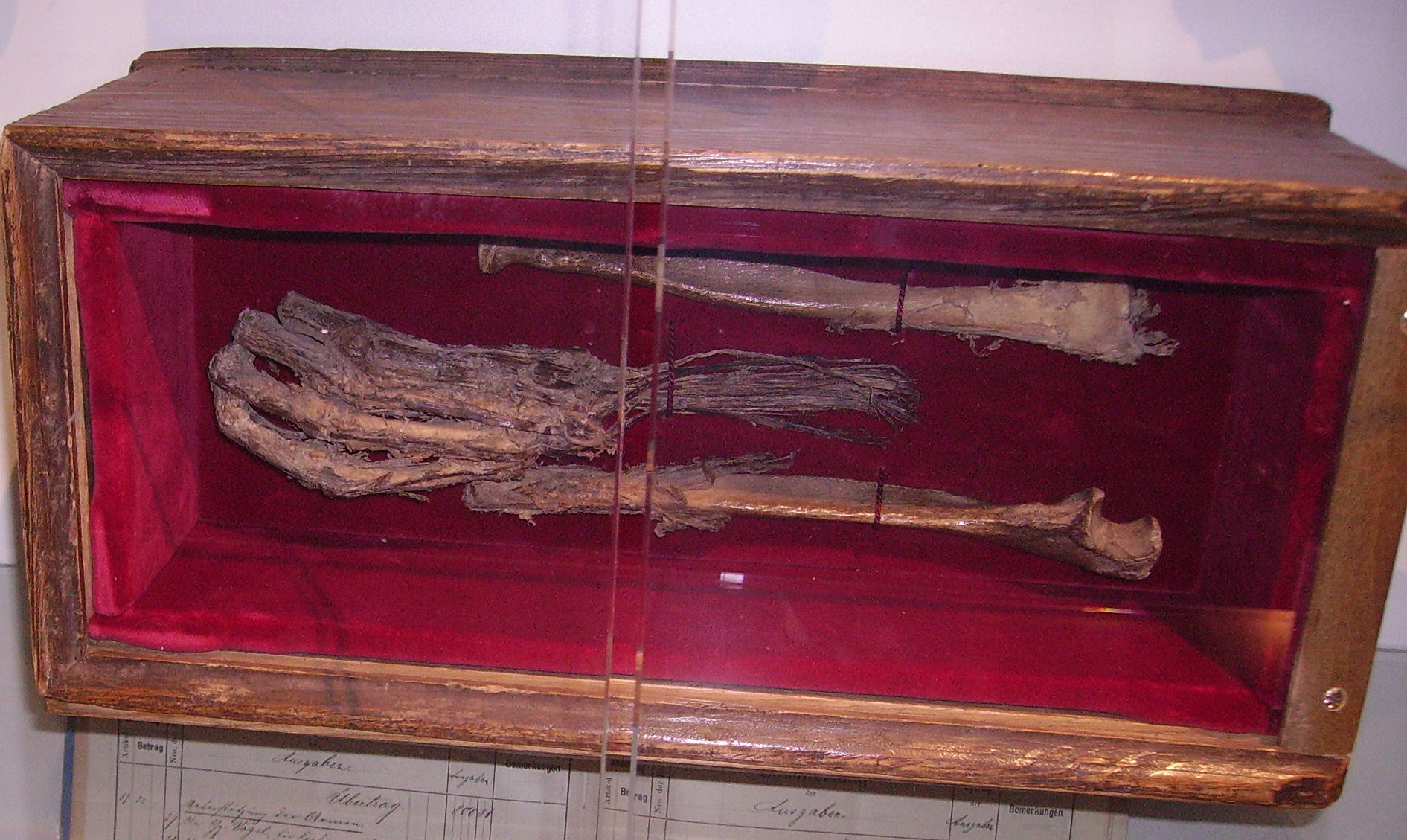
the "undecayable hand"

==== Museums ====
The local history museum is called Haus Isenburg. The roman ruins of the vicus can also be visited.

==== Clubs ====
- TSG Eisenberg (sports club)
- DRK-Eisenberg (health and emergency management)

== Economy and infrastructure ==
=== Industrial history ===
In its early days iron mining was an important part of Eisenberg's economy. The mining and processing of clay had an even bigger economic impact in the towns history. Old clay pits that demonstrate the ecological consequences of mining can be seen in the Erdekaut, south of the town center. The clay mine can no longer be visited due to the extension of commercial mining activity.

The Eisenberger Klebsand (roughly translated to "Eisenberg sticky sand") is a mineral with very good adhesion qualities and the purest of its kind in the world. It is made up of 14.5% clay, 6.5% silt, 76% sand and 3% gravel. Mineralogically speaking 85% of its mass are quartz.

=== Economy ===
Eisenberg is the only industrial town of the Donnersbergkreis district. The largest company with 1300 workers is Gienanth Eisengießerei (foundry) founded in 1735. An other important employer are the Klebsandwerke.

The headquarters of an insurance company (AOK Rheinland-Pfalz/Saarland), a retirement home (AZURIT Rohr GmbH) and an optician (Delker) are located in Eisenberg.

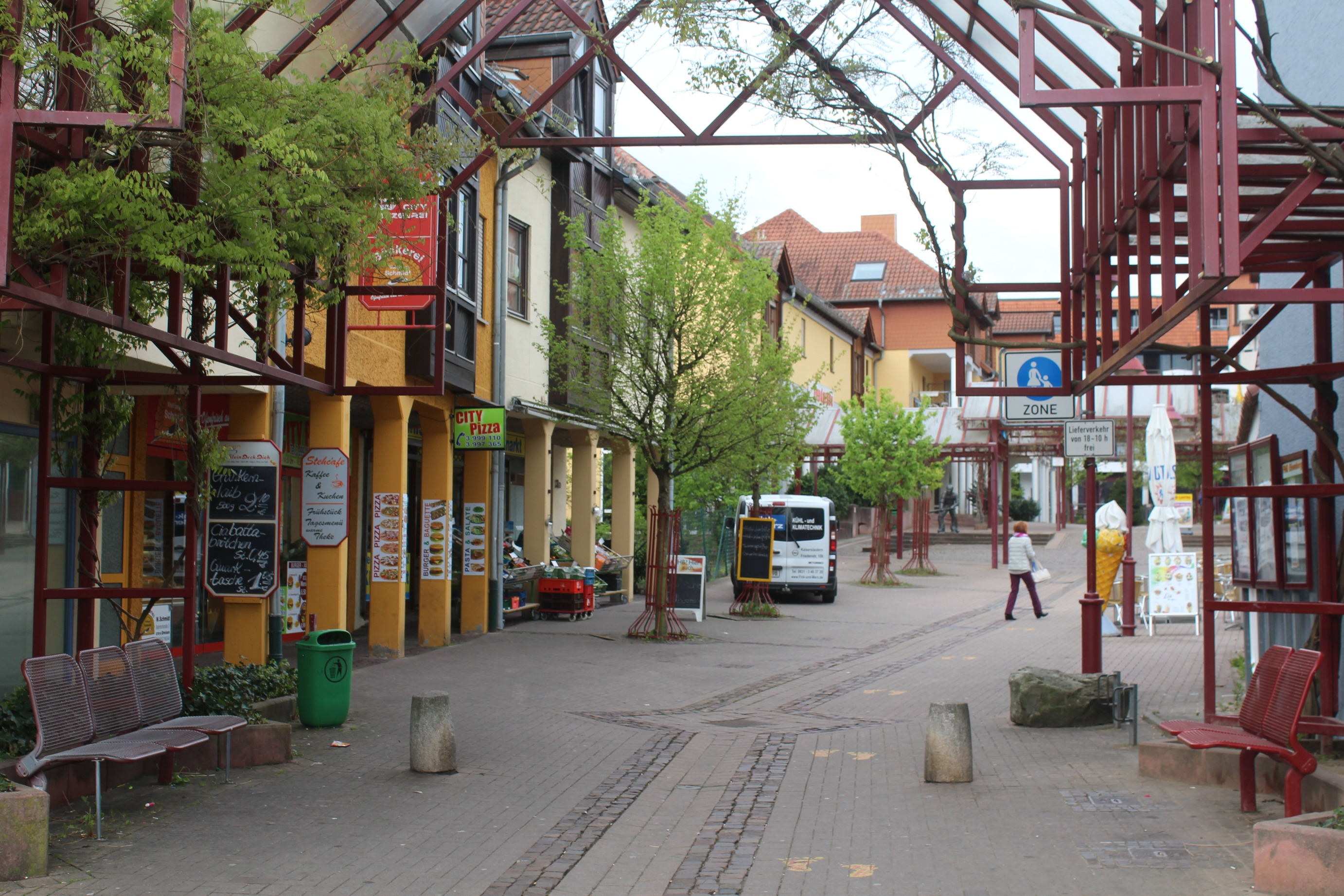
pedestrianised street

=== Infrastructure ===
==== Roads ====
The B47 federal road runs from Eisenberg to Worms and further into Hesse. The A6 highway can be reached 5.5 km (3.5 mi) south of Eisenberg (exit 18 Wattenheim). The A63 highway is 9 km (5.5 mi) to the north (exit 12 Göllheim).

==== Public transit ====
Public transit was integrated into the WVV since 2000 until VRN took over in summer of 2006.

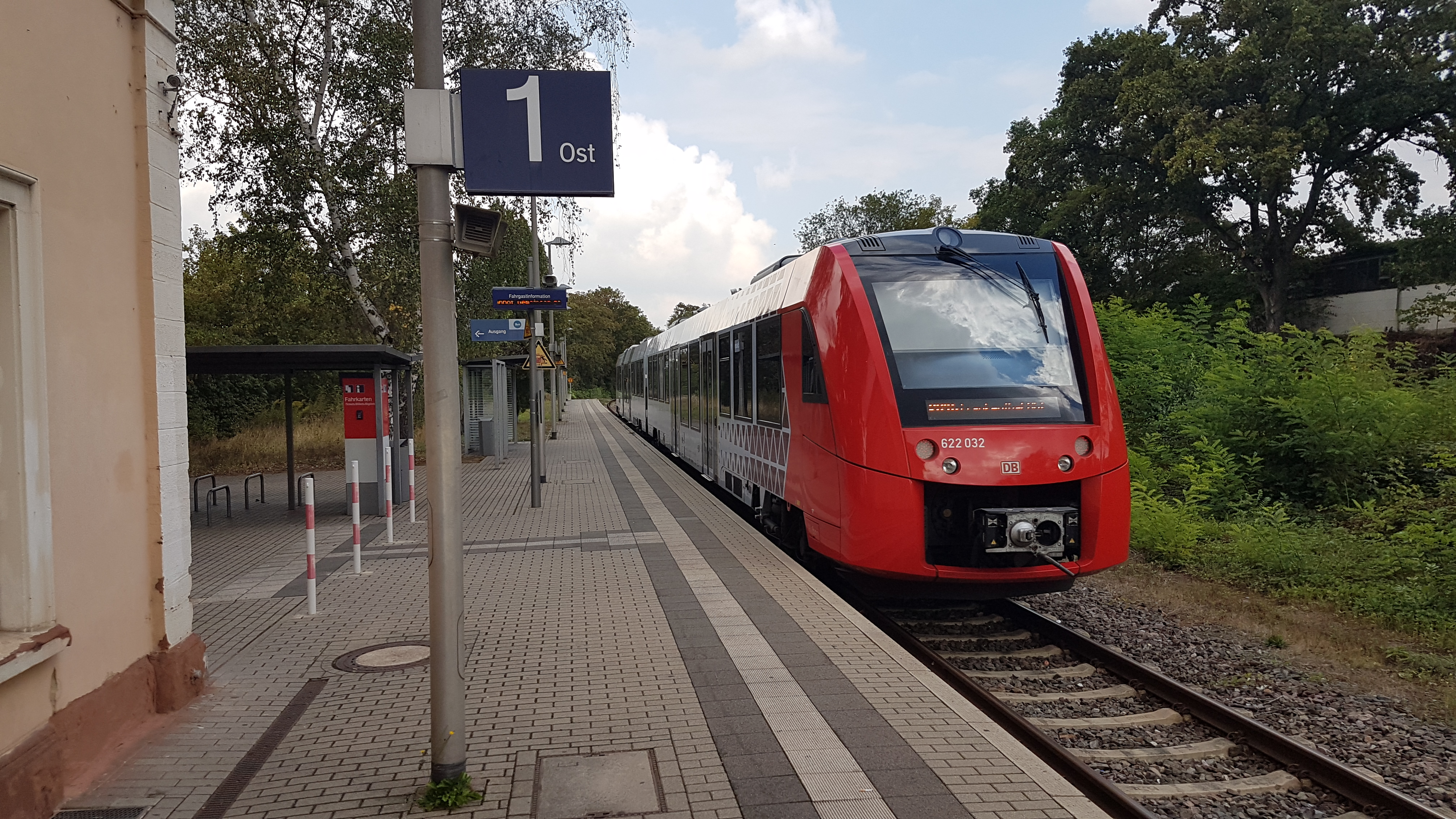
LINT multiple unit in Eisenberg

Eisenberg (Pfalz) railway station is located along the Eis Valley Railway, which was opened in 1876 it was extended to Enkenbach-Alsenborn in 1932. Passenger service on the line was discontinued in 1976 but reopened between 1994 and 2001. Trains now run every 60 minutes from Frankenthal via Grünstadt to Ramsen. On sundays and holidays the trains serve Eiswoog lake, a recreational area in the Palatinate Forest.

The section Ramsen-Enkenbach has been closed since 1990. The viaduct and other bridges on the line have shown damages since.

Line 920 of the VRN connects Eisenberg hourly to Göllheim and Kirchheimbolanden. Lines 917 and 918 serve as urban lines inside the town. It is further served by lines 902, 904 and 906, that connect Eisenberg to other municipalities inside Donnersbergkreis district. Lines 454, 455 and 457 connect it to the municipalities in Bad Dürkheim district as well as Enkenbach-Alsenborn in Kaiserslautern district.

=== Tourism ===
On the north-western edge of town is a hut of the Palatinate Forest Club, that was opened in 1976. Several hiking trails run through and around Eisenberg, as well as the Barbarossa Cycleway.

=== Education ===
Eisenberg has an elementary school, a high school (IGS) and a vocational school. There are five kindergartens in the municipality.

== Personalities ==
- Jaqueline Rauschkolb (born 1987), politician (SPD), parliamentary deputy since 2014
