= Stauf Castle =

Stauf Castle or Stauff Castle may refer to:

- Hohenstaufen Castle, Germany
- Stauf Castle (Palatinate), a ruined castle in the Palatine Forest, Germany
- Stauf Castle (Thalmässing), a ruined castle in the village of Stauf in the Bavarian municipality of Thalmässing, Germany
- Stauf Castle, (Haibach ob der Donau), a ruined castle in Haibach ob der Donau, Upper Austria
