= Göllheim =

- Municipality
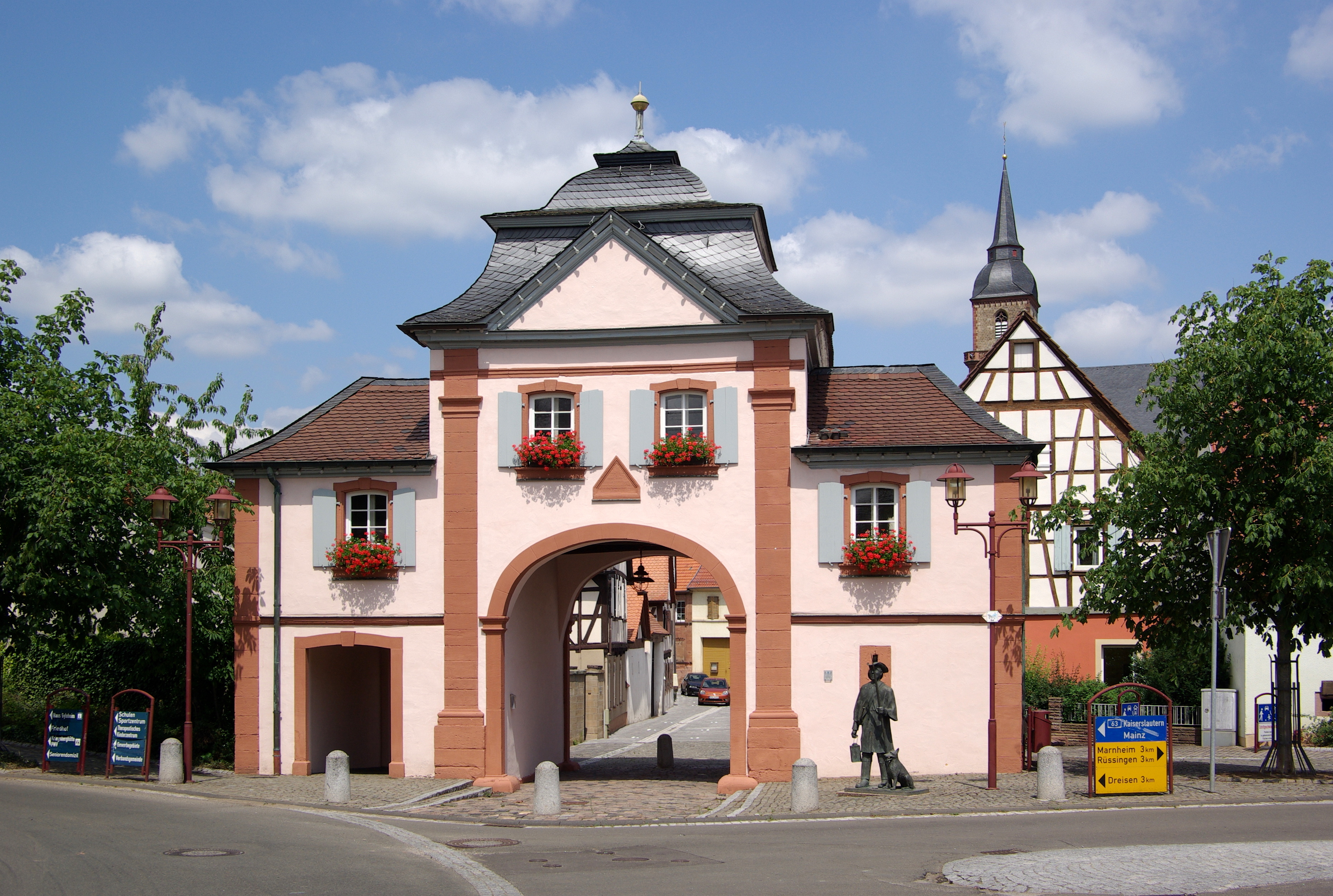
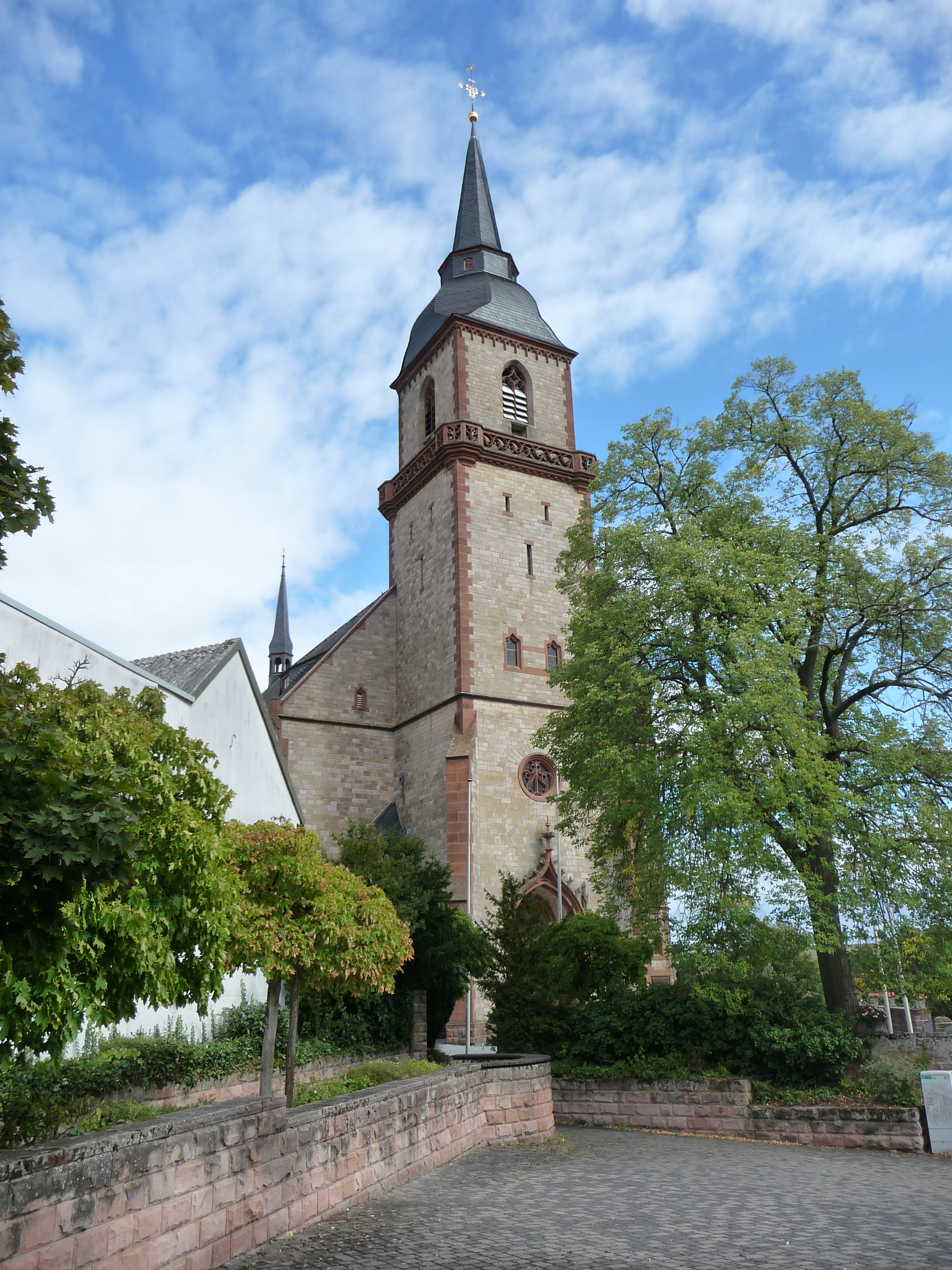
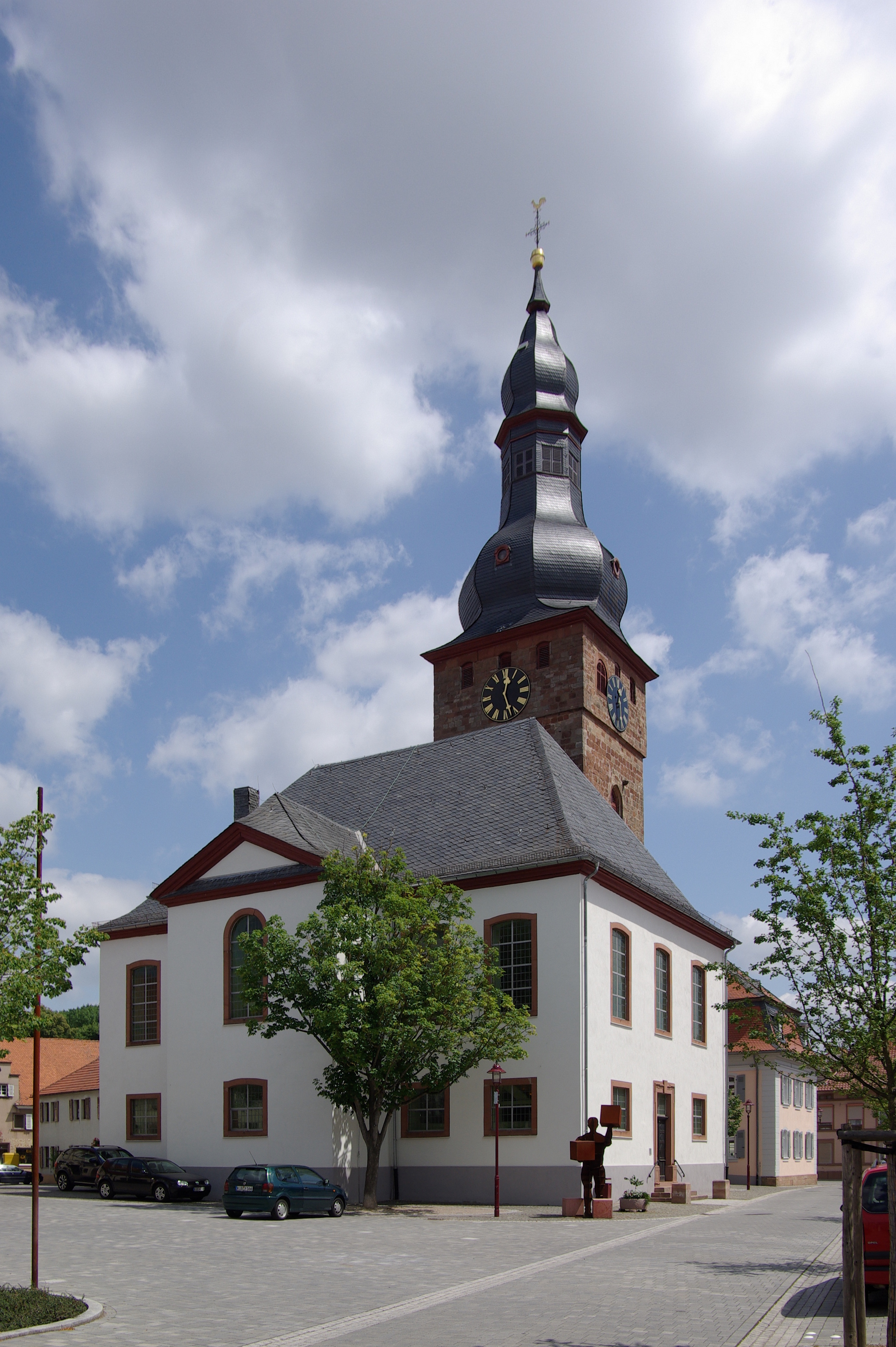
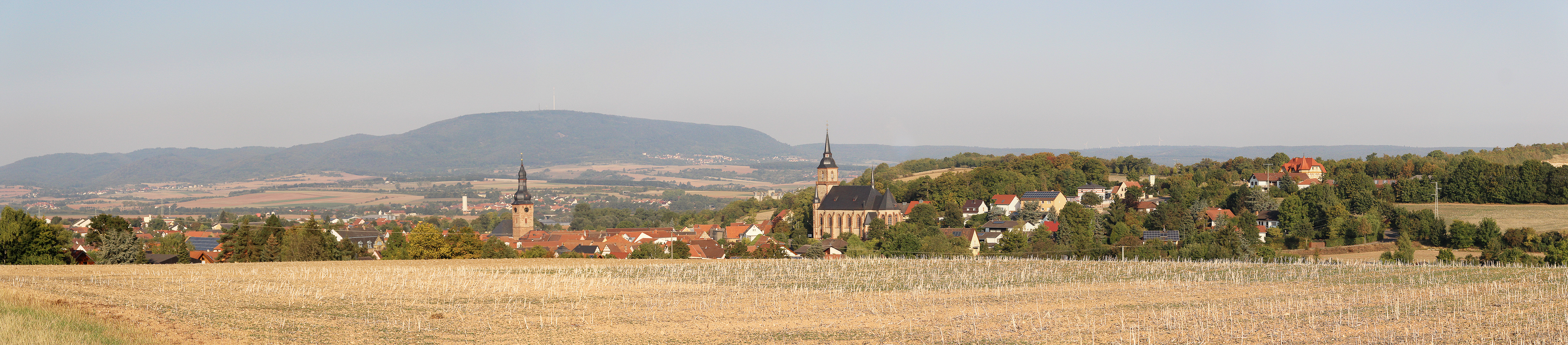
- Kerzenheim Gate Saint John of Nepomuk church Protestant church total view

- Coat of arms

- Location of Göllheim within Donnersbergkreis district
- Interactive map of Göllheim
- Location within Germany Location within Rhineland-Palatinate
- Coordinates: 49°35′32″N 8°2′54″E
- Country: Germany
- State: Rhineland-Palatinate
- District: Donnersbergkreis
- Municipal assoc.: Göllheim

Government
  - Mayor (2019–24): Dieter Hartmüller (CDU)

Area
  - Total: 18.02 km^{2} (6.96 sq mi)
- Elevation: 244 m (801 ft)

Population (2025-12-31)
  - Total: 3,807
  - Density: 211.3/km^{2} (547.2/sq mi)
- Time zone: UTC+01:00 (CET)
  - Summer (DST): UTC+02:00 (CEST)
- Postal codes: 67307
- Dialling codes: 06351
- Vehicle registration: KIB
- Website: https://www.gemeinde-goellheim.de/

Göllheim (pronounced [ˈɡœlhaɪm]) is a municipality in the Donnersbergkreis, in Rhineland-Palatinate, Germany. It is situated north of the Palatinate Forest, approx. 25 km west of Worms. It was the site of the 1298 Battle of Göllheim.

Göllheim is the seat of the Verbandsgemeinde ("collective municipality") Göllheim.

== Buildings ==
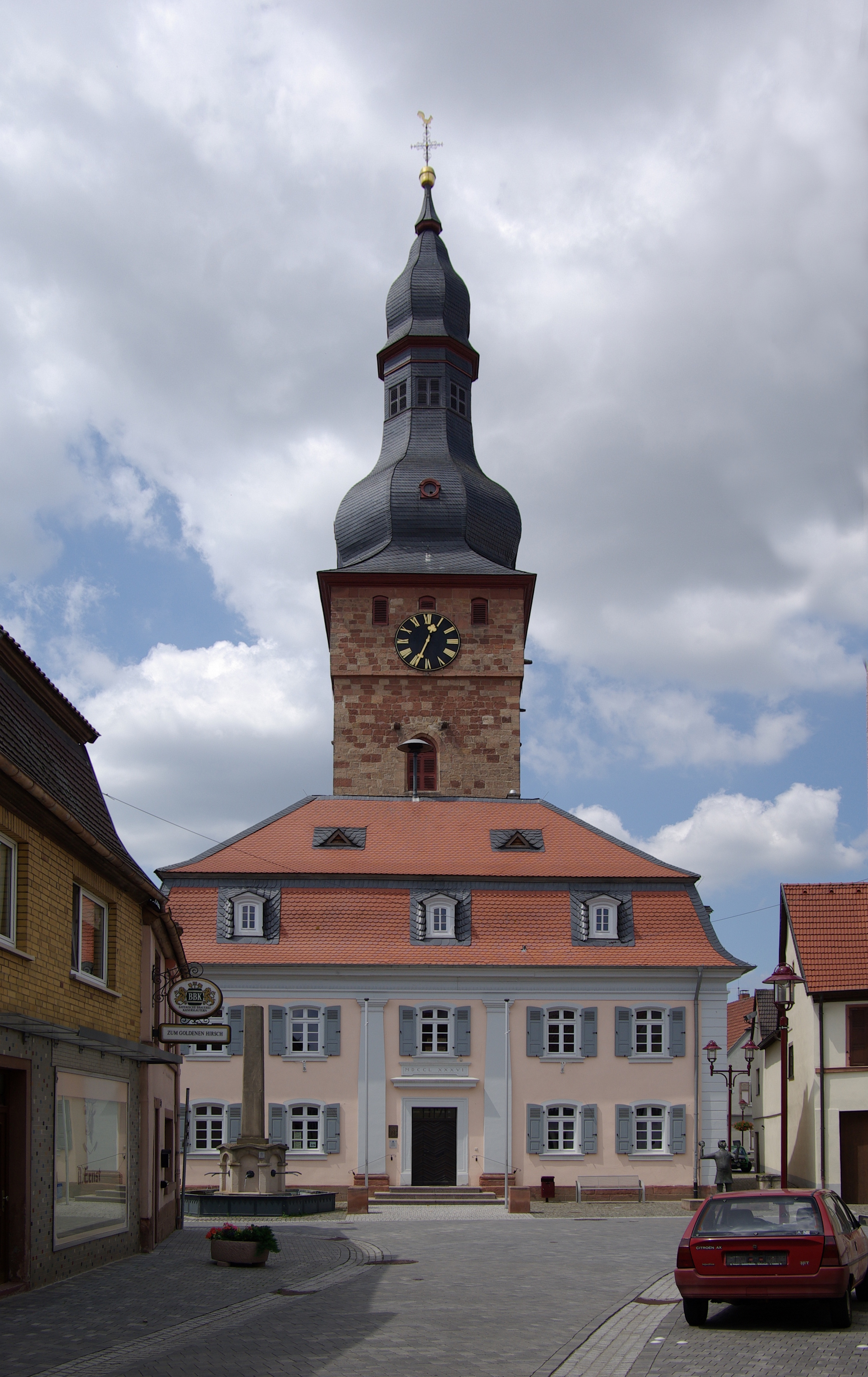
townhall

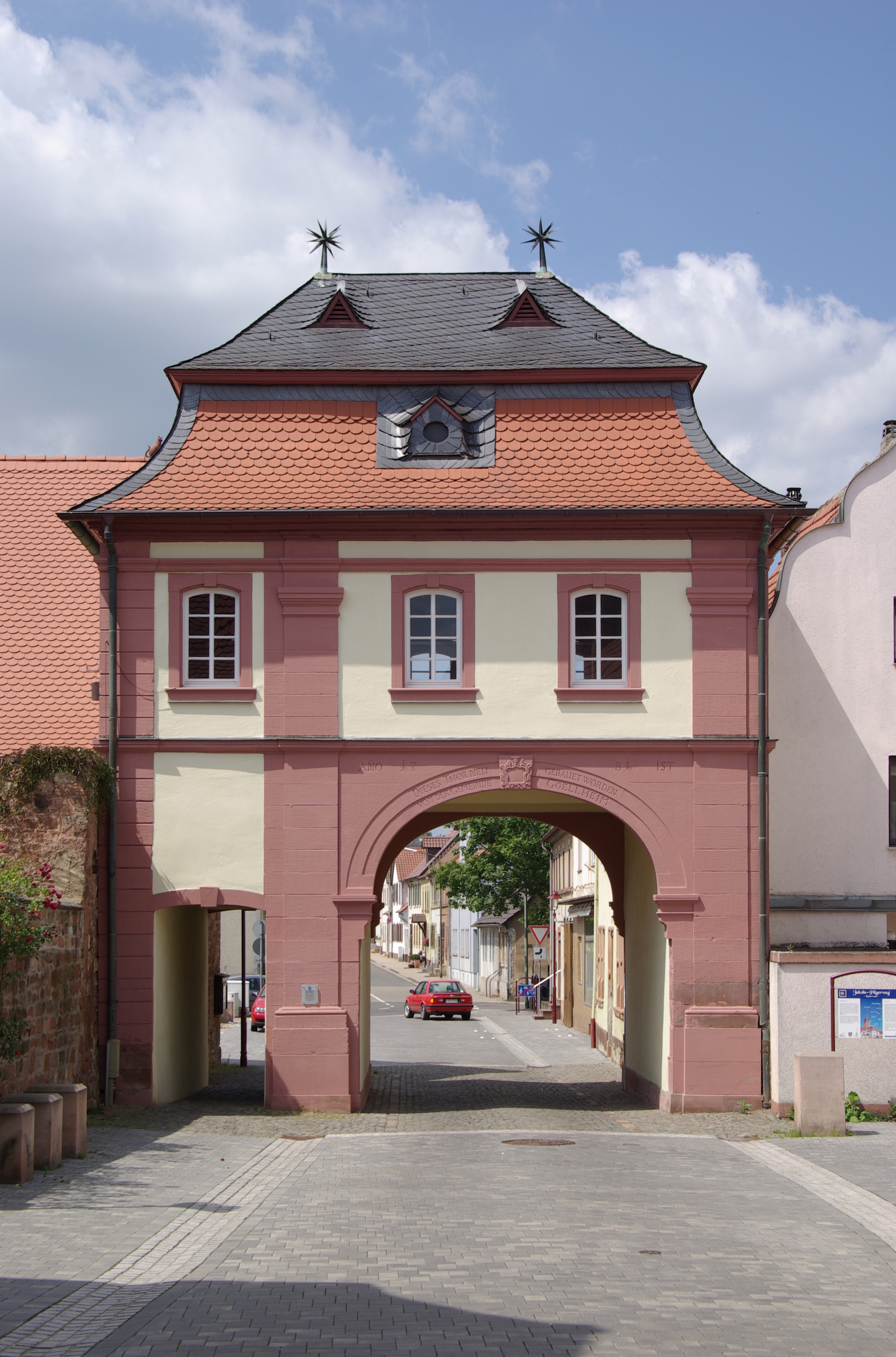
city gate

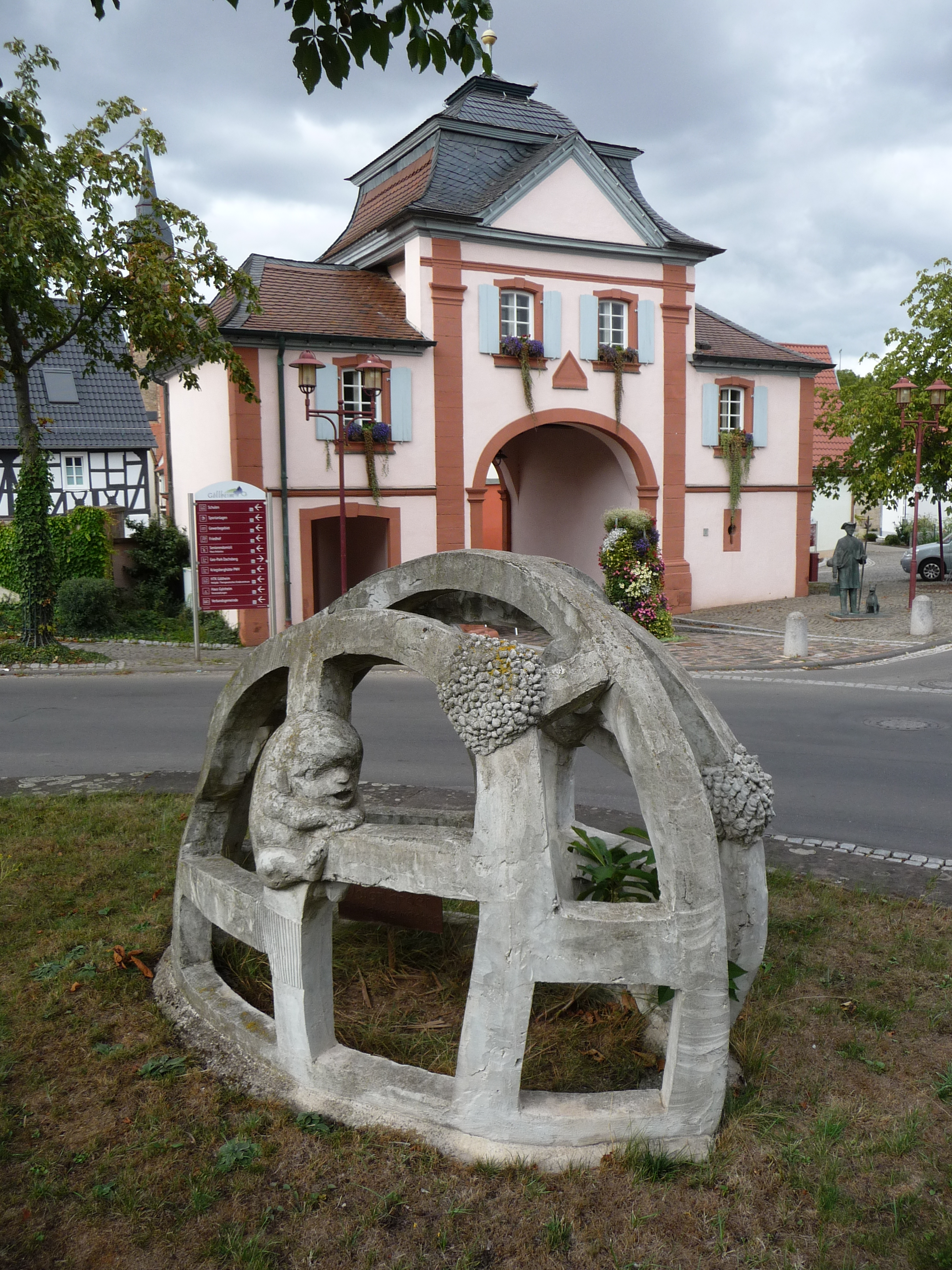
city gate

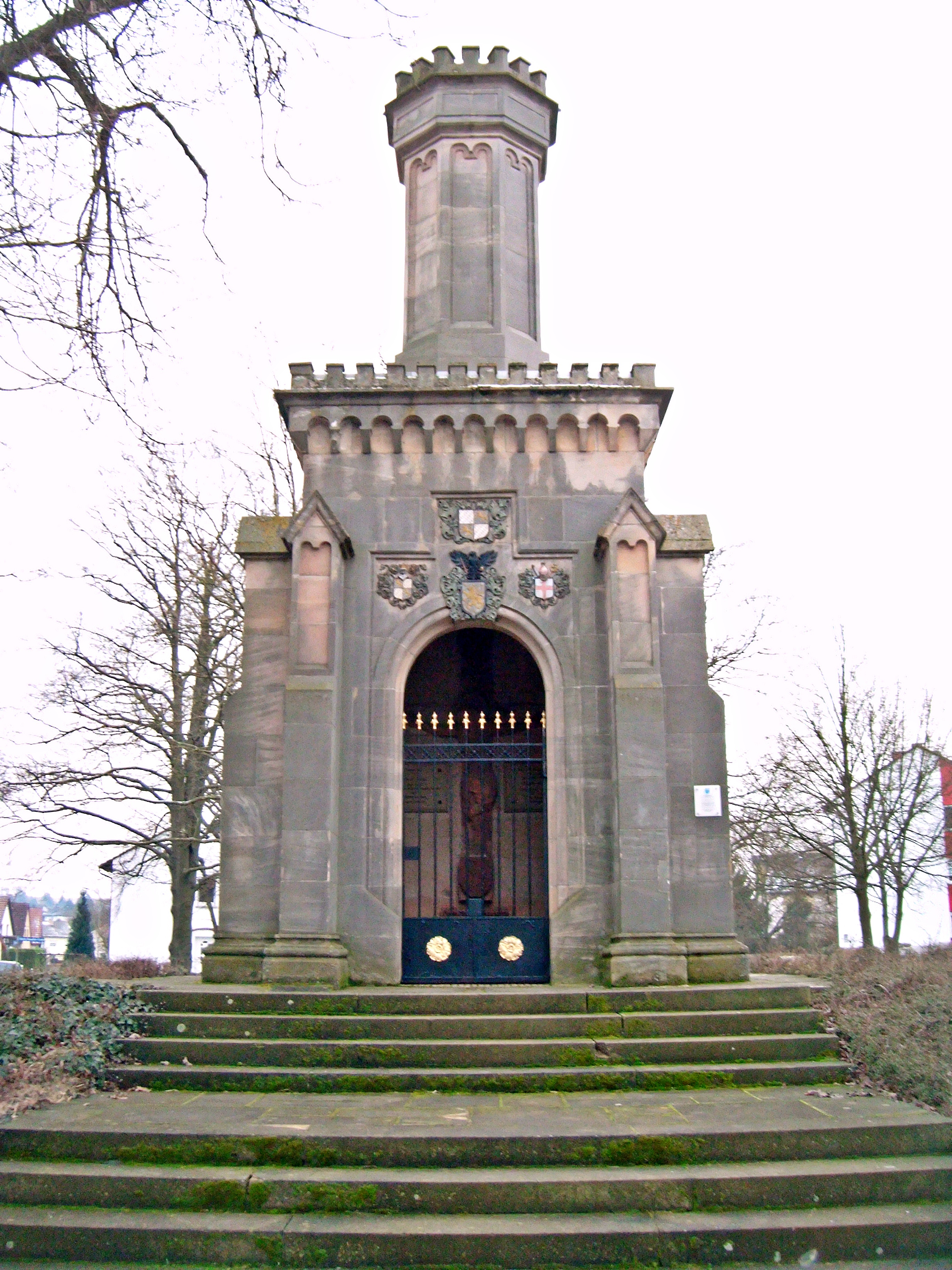
chapel

=== Sculptures ===
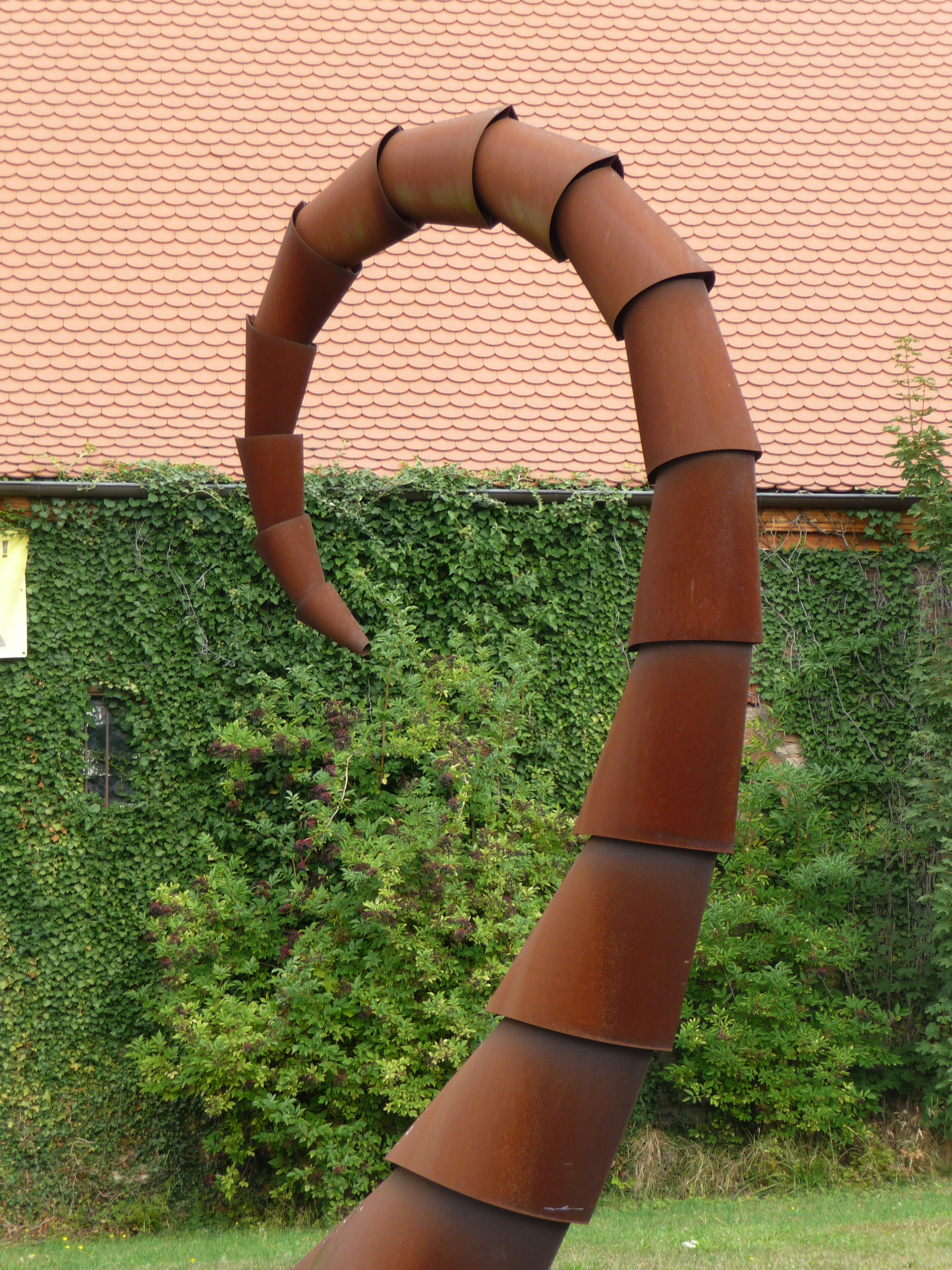
„Sproß“ (sprout)

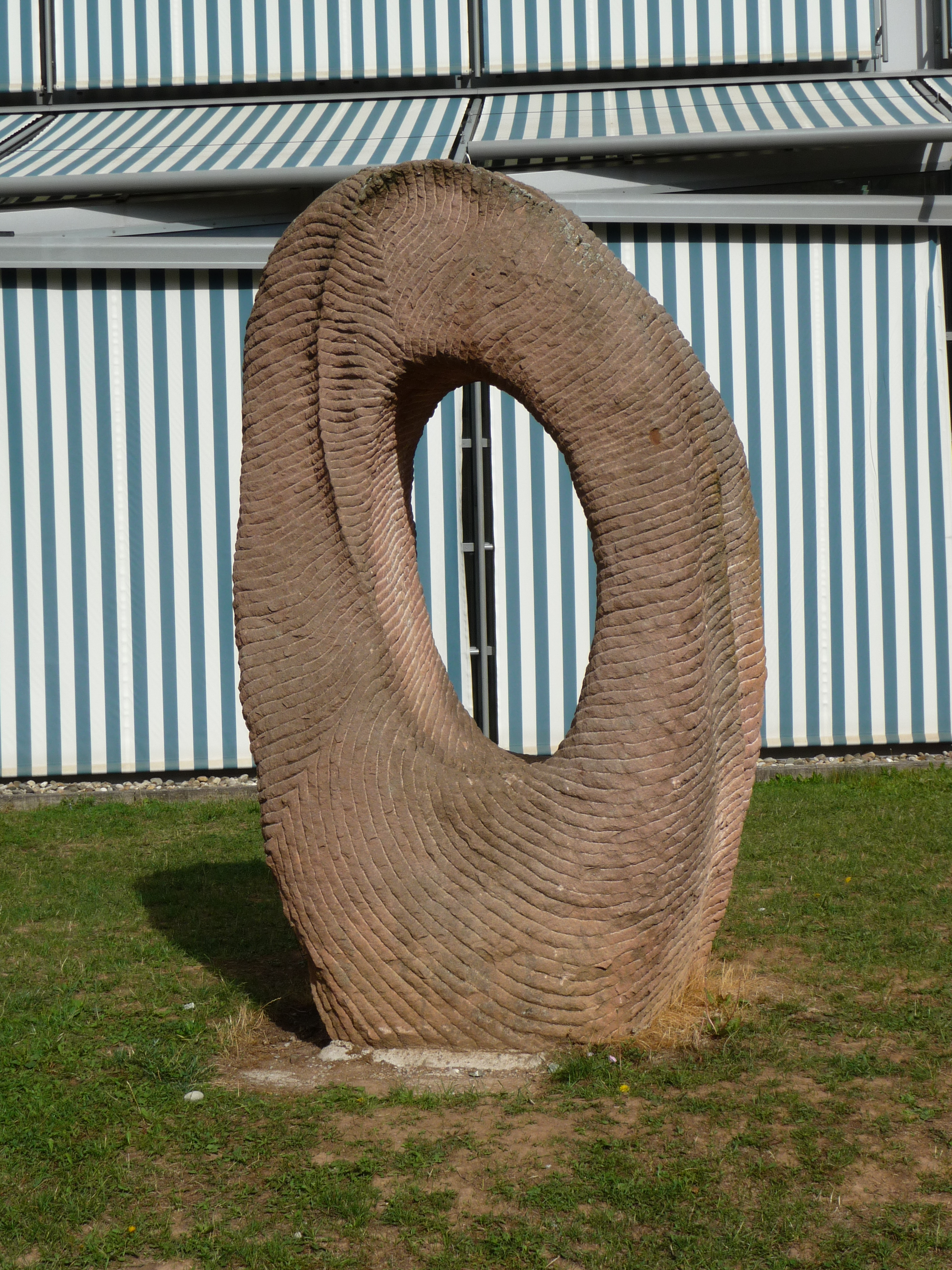
„Aufbruch“ (breakup)

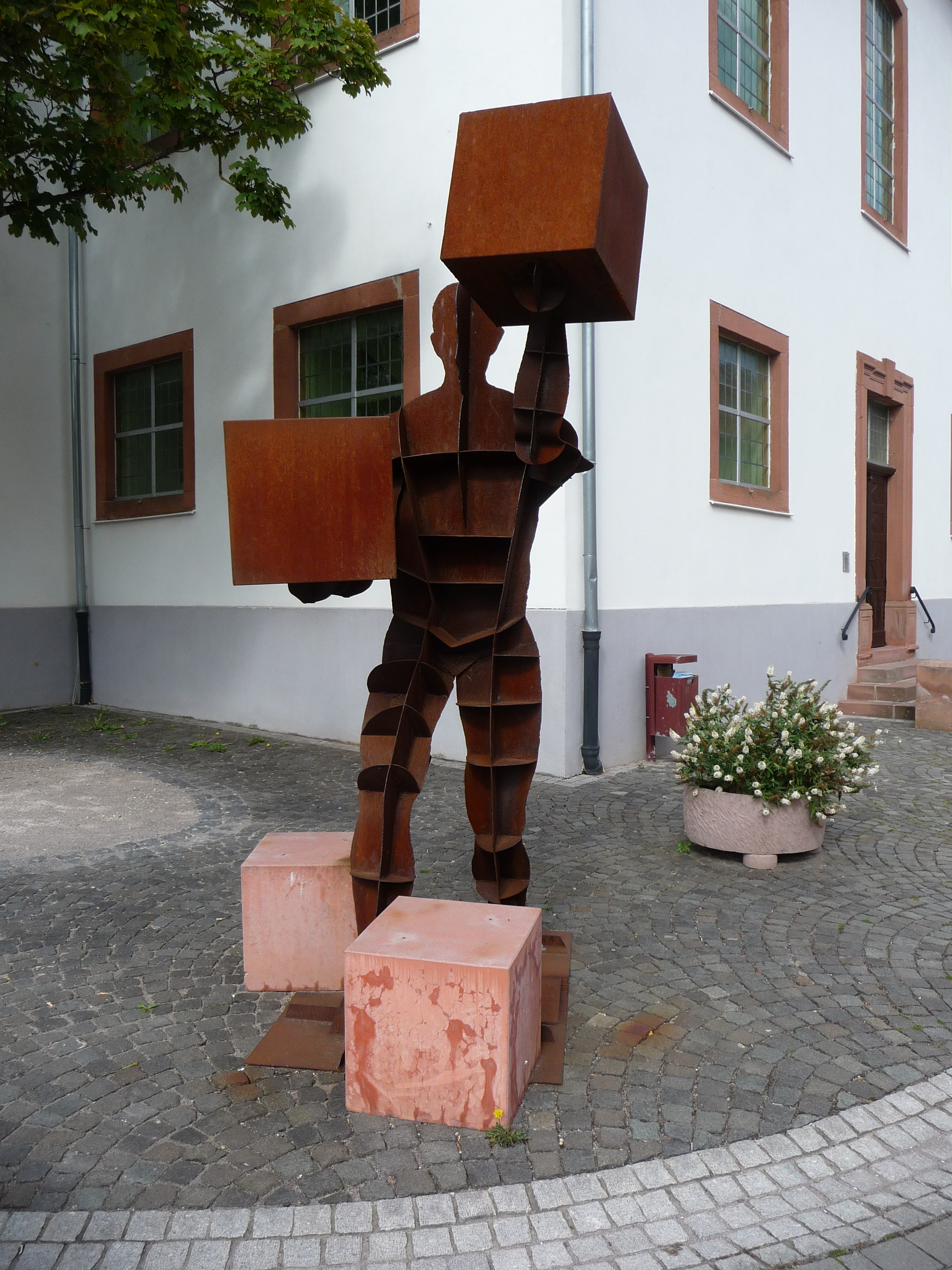
„Jongleur“ (juggler)

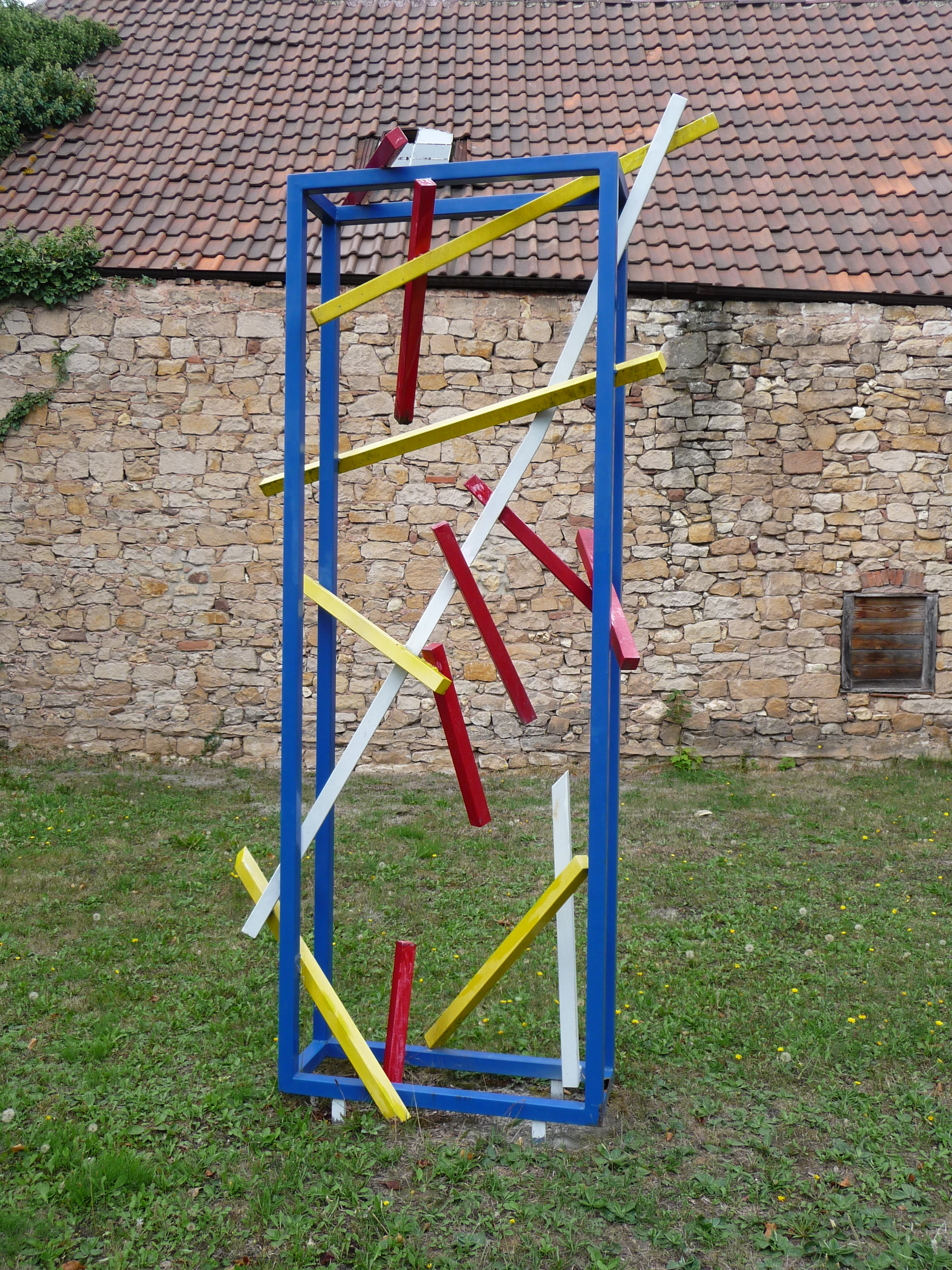
„Roter Rahmen“ (red frame)
