= Jaqueline Rauschkolb =

German politician (born 1987)

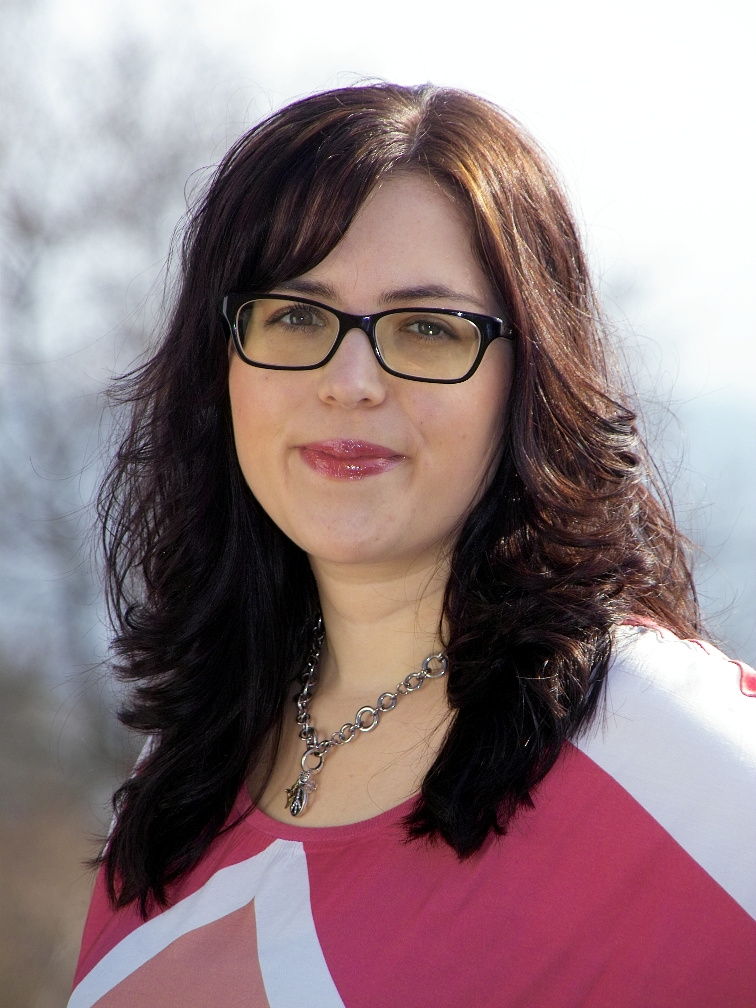
- Rauschkolb in 2014

Member of the Landtag of Rhineland-Palatinate
- Incumbent
- Assumed office 12 November 2014
- Preceded by: Margit Conrad
- Constituency: Donnersberg

Personal details
- Born: 20 September 1987 (age 39) Kirchheimbolanden
- Party: Social Democratic Party (since 2005)

Jaqueline Rauschkolb (born 20 September 1987 in Kirchheimbolanden) is a German politician serving as a member of the Landtag of Rhineland-Palatinate since 2014. From 2013 to 2015, she served as chairwoman of Jusos in Rhineland-Palatinate. Rauschkolb lives in Eisenberg, where she is member of the town council since 2014.

In May 2026, Rauschkolb was elected vice president of the Landtag of Rhineland-Palatinate.
