= Eisenberg (Verbandsgemeinde) =

Eisenberg (Pfalz)
- Verbandsgemeinde
- Coat of arms

- Location of Eisenberg (Pfalz) within Donnersbergkreis district
- Interactive map of Eisenberg (Pfalz)
- Location within Germany Location within Rhineland-Palatinate
- Coordinates: 49°33′41″N 8°04′21″E
- Country: Germany
- State: Rhineland-Palatinate
- District: Donnersbergkreis
- Subdivisions: 3 Gemeinden

Government
  - Mayor (2018–26): Bernd Frey (SPD)

Area
  - Total: 63.7 km^{2} (24.6 sq mi)

Population (2025-12-31)
  - Total: 12,975
  - Density: 204/km^{2} (528/sq mi)
- Time zone: UTC+01:00 (CET)
  - Summer (DST): UTC+02:00 (CEST)
- Vehicle registration: KIB
- Website: www.vg-eisenberg.de

Eisenberg is a Verbandsgemeinde ("collective municipality") in the Donnersbergkreis, in Rhineland-Palatinate, Germany. The seat of the Verbandsgemeinde is in Eisenberg.

== Municipalities ==
The Verbandsgemeinde Eisenberg consists of the following Ortsgemeinden ("local municipalities"):

1. Eisenberg
2. Kerzenheim
3. Ramsen
