= Steinborn (Eisenberg, Rhineland-Palatinate) =

- Borough of Eisenberg
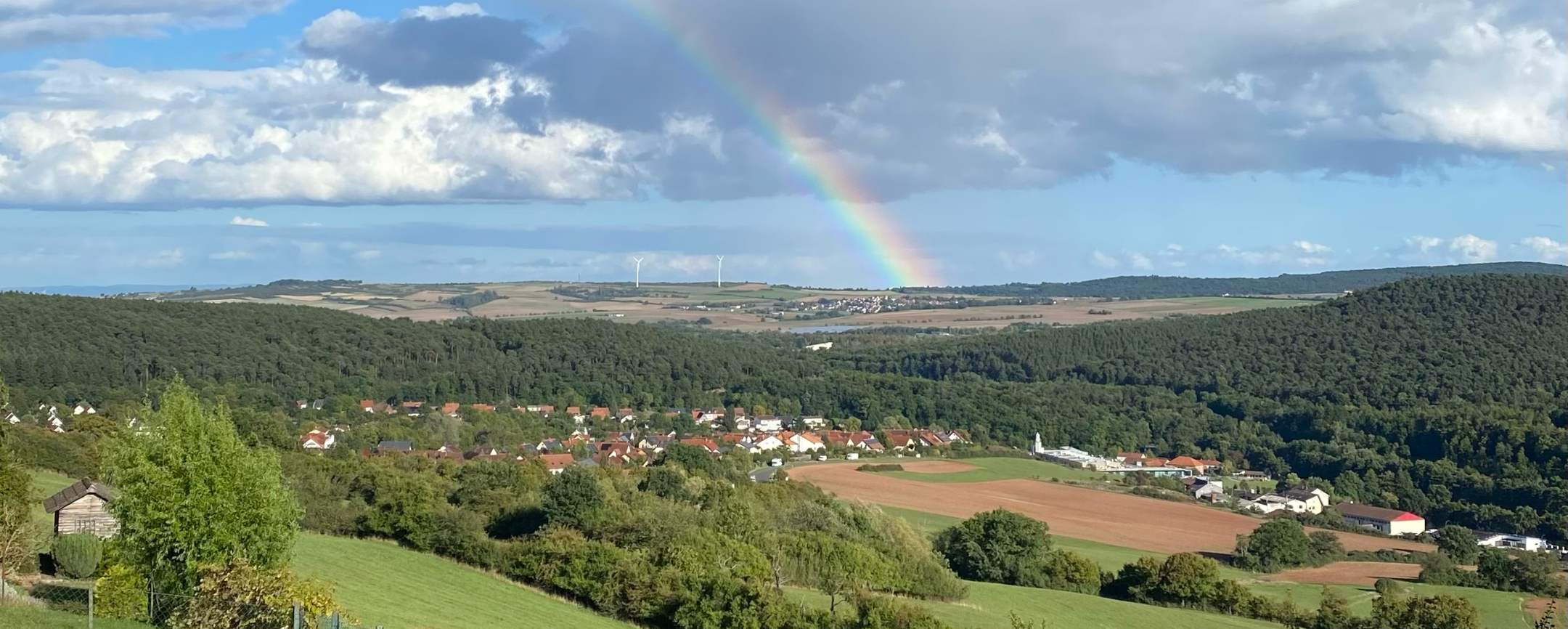
- Steinborn seen from neighbouring Stauf
- Interactive map of Steinborn
- Location within Germany Location within Rhineland-Palatinate
- Coordinates: 49°33′N 8°03′E
- Country: Germany
- State: Rhineland-Palatinate
- District: Donnersbergkreis
- Town: Eisenberg

Government
  - Mayor: Alexander Haas (FW)

Area
  - Total: 0.63 km^{2} (0.24 sq mi)

Population (2020)
  - Total: 1,850
  - Density: 2,900/km^{2} (7,600/sq mi)
- Time zone: UTC+01:00 (CET)
  - Summer (DST): UTC+02:00 (CEST)
- Postal codes: 67304
- Dialling codes: 06351
- Website: Ortsteil Steinborn

Steinborn is a borough of Eisenberg in the Donnersbergkreis district, in Rhineland-Palatinate, Germany.

== Geography ==
Steinborn is located 1 km (0.6 mi) west of Eisenberg on the northern edge of the Palatine Forest. The Eisbach river flows south of the village. The nearest large cities are Kaiserslautern 27 km (17 mi) west and Mannheim 47 km (29 mi) south-east.

== History ==
Steinborn was founded in 1936 by workers of the nearby Gienanth iron works. The first houses were built in today's Paul-Münch-Straße.

Mayor Ludwig, architect Matheis, Siedlerobmann Franz Storbek and the Heimstätte AG (Neustadt) broke ground for the new settlement on 3 November 1936. After that the place grew fast from 16 families in 1937 to 121 people in late 1938. Delayed by the turmoil of World War II the completion of the community center (known as "Hallchen" today) took until 1952 and the first communal christmas celebrations took place.

The history of the new Steinbornsiedlung began 26 May 1965, when Paul Lücke, secretary of housing and urban planning, laid the foundation stone on Uhlandstraße 1. A plaque displaying the year 1965 can still be found at the site.

Including the original settlement around Paul-Münch-Straße the new subdivision of "Eisenberg-Steinborn" was developed by Worms based construction company dfh. Due to good financial plans and work from the owners themselves the homes were affordable to families who could not own one before.

New urban planning concepts were tested in Steinborn, which became a "Demonstrativ-Bauvorhaben der Bundesregierung" ("Demonstrative Construction Project of the Federal Gouverment"). Living in peaceful homes embedded into nature with quiet paths and streets was a core idea of the project. In the beginning Steinborn had an inn, a general store, a bakery and a bank. Today the "Bistro Cosmopolitan" is the only active business.

The "Haus der Kirche" (church) with the Hauth family as pastors and administrators is a key part to life in the borough.
