= Stauf Castle (Palatinate) =

Castle ruins in Eisenberg, Rhineland-Palatinate, Germany

Burg Stauf
- castellum Stoufenburc
- Eisenberg-Stauf
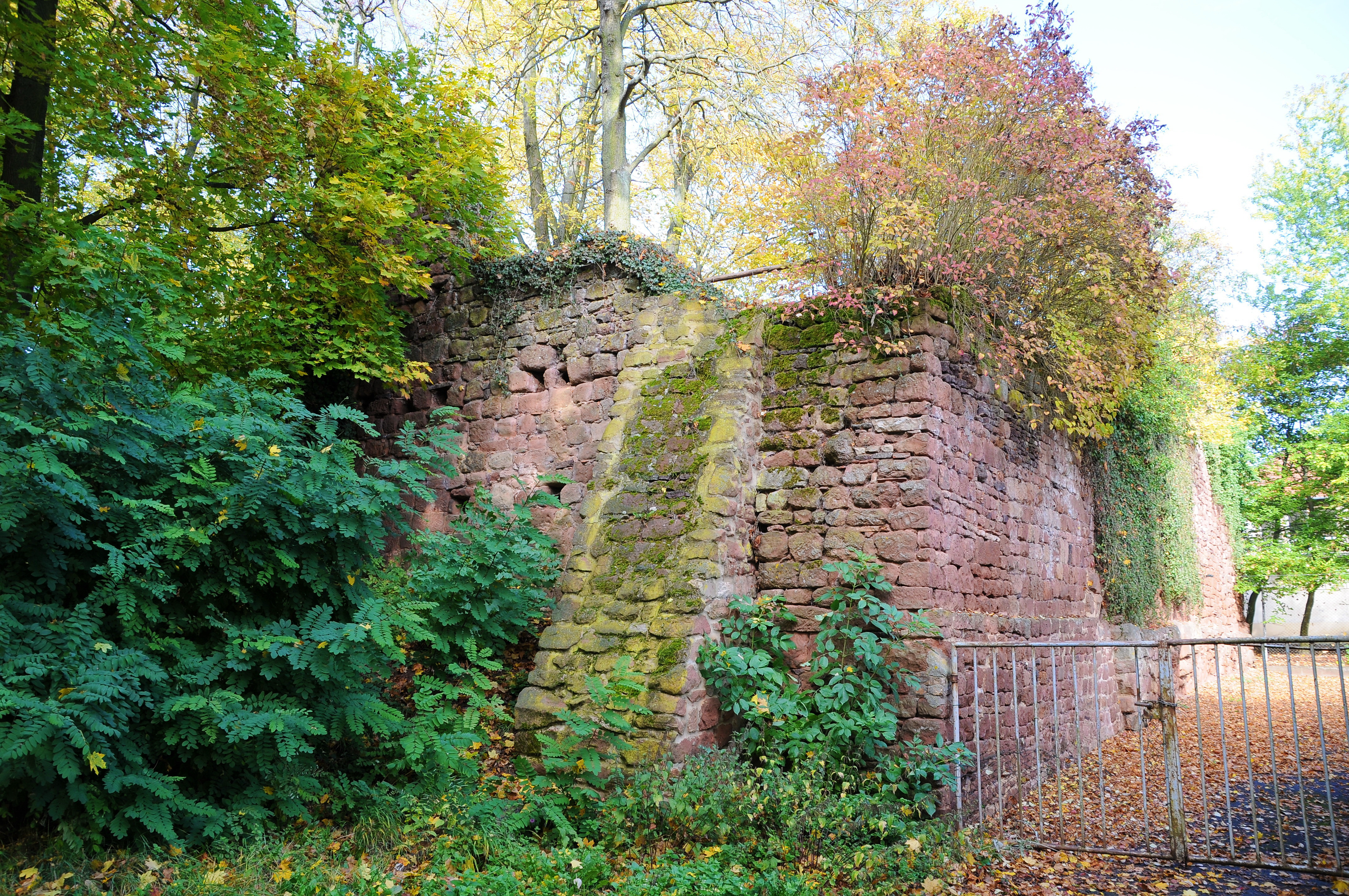

Site information
- Type: hill castle, spur castle
- Code: DE-RP
- Condition: ruin

Location
- Coordinates: 49°33′0″N 8°1′37″E
- Height: 327.1 m above sea level (NHN)

Site history
- Built: c. 1000

Garrison information
- Occupants: counts

Stauf Castle (German: Burg Stauf) is a ruined spur castle near the village of Stauf in the borough of Eisenberg in the county of Donnersbergkreis in the German state of Rhineland-Palatinate.

== Location ==
Stauf Castle stands south of the village named after it on a hill ridge, 327.1 m high, which runs northwards above the valley of the Eisbach. It is accessible from Stauf on a woodland track.

== History ==
The castle was probably built before 1000 AD and is mentioned as castellum Stoufenburc around 1012. It is thus the oldest recorded structure of its type in the Palatinate region.

=== High Middle Ages ===
- The first historically verified record of Stauf Castle is in connexion with a stay by the Salian, Duke Conrad I of Carinthia (975–1011). His son, Duke Conrad II (~1003–1039), as well as holding a dukedom, also held the office of a count in the Wormsgau, Speyergau and Nahegau. Due to an uprising against his cousin, King Conrad II he had to slight several of his castles. That may be the reason why there is no mention of Stauf Castle for the next 2 centuries. He died without issue.
- Godfrey of Staufen (died probably around 1187/1188), son of Conrad of Hohenstaufen (1134/36–1195) and descendant of King and Emperor Conrad II, may be identified as the owner of the castle.
- Count Eberhard III of Eberstein (c. 1144–before 1219) inherited ownership of the castle until 1190, apparently through marriage to Kunigunde (born c. 1165), who must have been a descendant of Conrad of Hohenstaufen and, after the male line died out (by 1188), became heiress of the Barony of Stauf. Conrad's other daughter, Agnes of Hohenstaufen (died 1204), inherited the County Palatine by Rhein.
- Eberhard IV by Eberstein (c. 1190–18 March 1263), became Baron of Stauf and founder of the Cistercian abbey of Rosenthal after an inheritance division.
- Agnes III of Eberstein, his daughter, married Henry II of Saarbrücken-Zweibrücken in 1238, which is why the Barony of Stauf and Rosenthal Abbey fell to this family. Their daughter, Kunigunde (died before 1283) was the first abbess of Rosenthal and she also affiliated the convent to the Cistercian Order. In the Electorate of Trier is the recorded as the liege lord for Stauf Castle, as opposed to Henry II.

=== Late Middle Ages and Modern Times ===
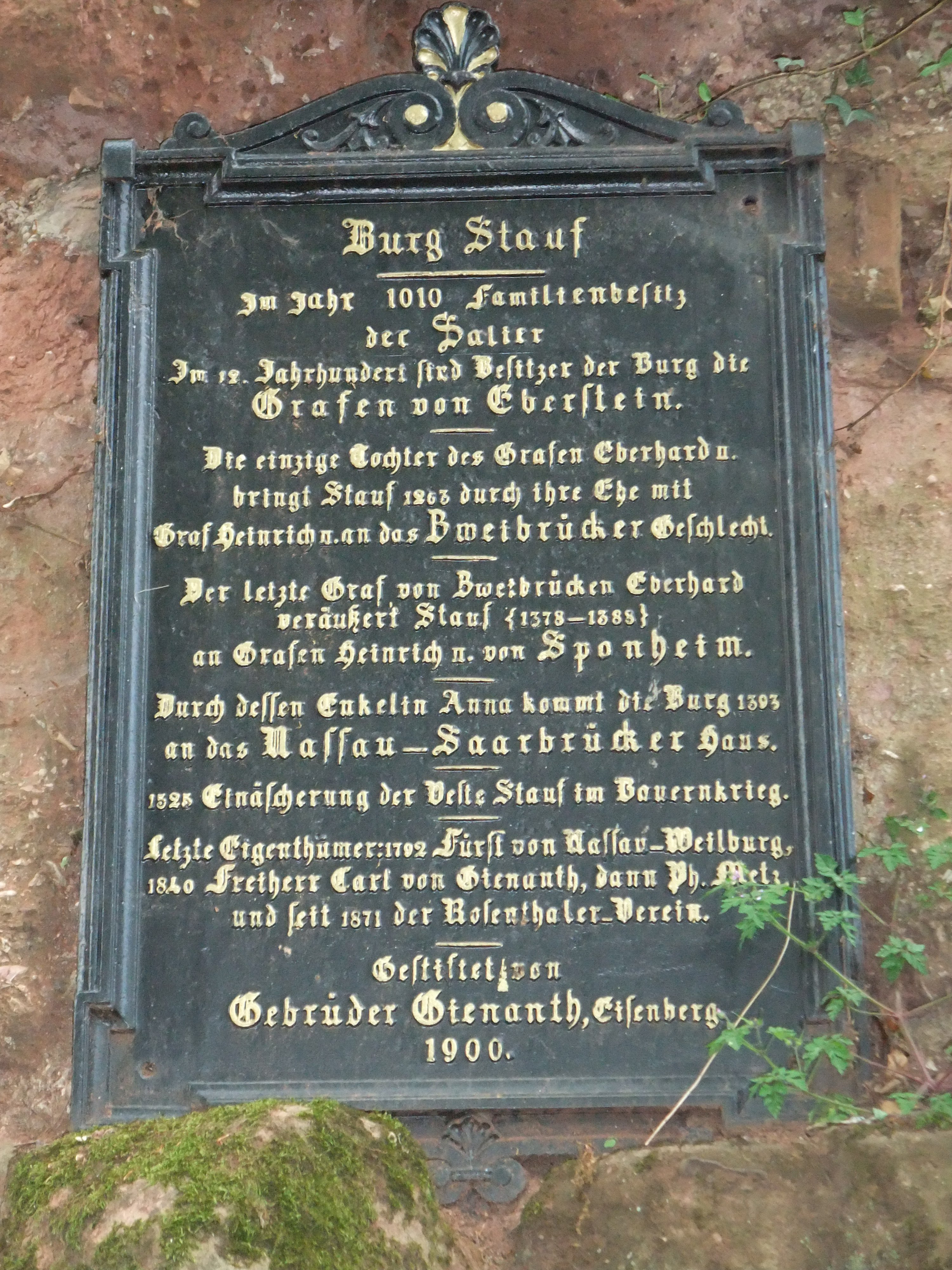
Information board at Stauf Castle near Eisenberg (Palatinate)

Count Henry II of Sponheim-Bolanden bought the castle between 1378 and 1388. After the death of Count Henry II in 1393, the Barony of Stauf was bequeathed to the husband of his granddaughter, Count Philip I of Nassau-Saarbrücken. Until the end of the 18th century it remained together with the Barony of Kirchheim in the possession of the House of Nassau.

In 1525, during the German Peasants' War, the castle, which consisted of an outer bailey (southern bailey), a middle bailey and the inner bailey (northern bailey), was destroyed.

From 1871, the Historische Verein Rosenthal owned the ruin until it was transferred to the town of Eisenberg in June 2000.

== Literature ==
- Martin Dolch, Stefan Ulrich: Pfälzisches Burgenlexikon. Vol. IV.2 (2007). Institut für Pfälzische Geschichte und Volkskunde Kaiserslautern (publ.). ISBN 978-3-927754-56-0, pp. 10–21
- Hermann Schreibmüller: Burg und Herrschaft Stauf in der Pfalz. 2 parts, Thieme, Kaiserslautern 1913–1914 digitalised
- Kurt Dell: Glanzpunkt des deutschen Reiches. In: Donnersberg-Jahrbuch 2001. Kirchheimbolanden, pp. 74–78
- Adolph Köllner, Geschichte der Herrschaft Kirchheim-Boland und Stauf: Nach J. M. Kremer’s und J. Andreä’s Manuscripten, zuverlässigen Urkunden und anderen Hülfsmitteln bearbeitet. Published by the Verein für Nassauische Alterthumskunde und Geschichtsforschung, Wiesbaden, 1854 digitalised (Google eBook)
- Maps of the Nassau Barony of Kirchheim and Stauf:
  - Entwicklung der Grafschaft Nassau vor 1800. Geschichtlicher Atlas von Hessen. In: Landesgeschichtliches Informationssystem Hessen (LAGIS).
  - Hessen im Jahre 1789. Geschichtlicher Atlas von Hessen. In: Landesgeschichtliches Informationssystem Hessen (LAGIS).
