= Kerzenheim =

- Municipality
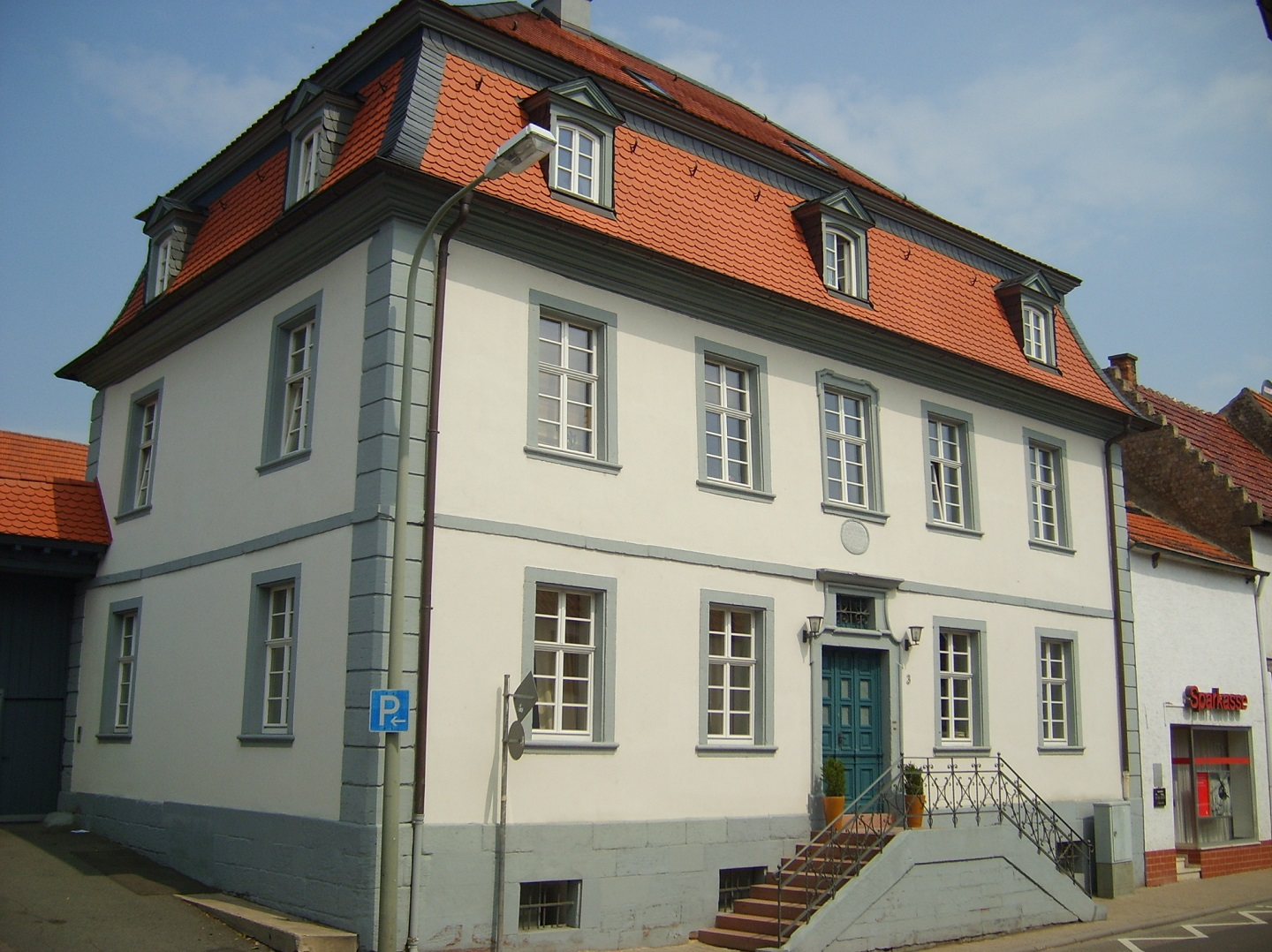
- house built in 1736

- Coat of arms

- Location of Kerzenheim within Donnersbergkreis district
- Interactive map of Kerzenheim
- Location within Germany Location within Rhineland-Palatinate
- Coordinates: 49°34′35″N 8°03′34″E
- Country: Germany
- State: Rhineland-Palatinate
- District: Donnersbergkreis
- Municipal assoc.: Eisenberg

Government
  - Mayor (2019–24): Andrea Schmitt

Area
  - Total: 17.89 km^{2} (6.91 sq mi)
- Elevation: 201 m (659 ft)

Population (2025-12-31)
  - Total: 2,061
  - Density: 115.2/km^{2} (298.4/sq mi)
- Time zone: UTC+01:00 (CET)
  - Summer (DST): UTC+02:00 (CEST)
- Postal codes: 67304
- Dialling codes: 06351
- Vehicle registration: KIB

Kerzenheim (German pronunciation: [ˈkɛʁtsn̩haɪm]) is a municipality in the Donnersbergkreis district, in Rhineland-Palatinate, Germany.
