= Neu-Bamberg =

- Municipality
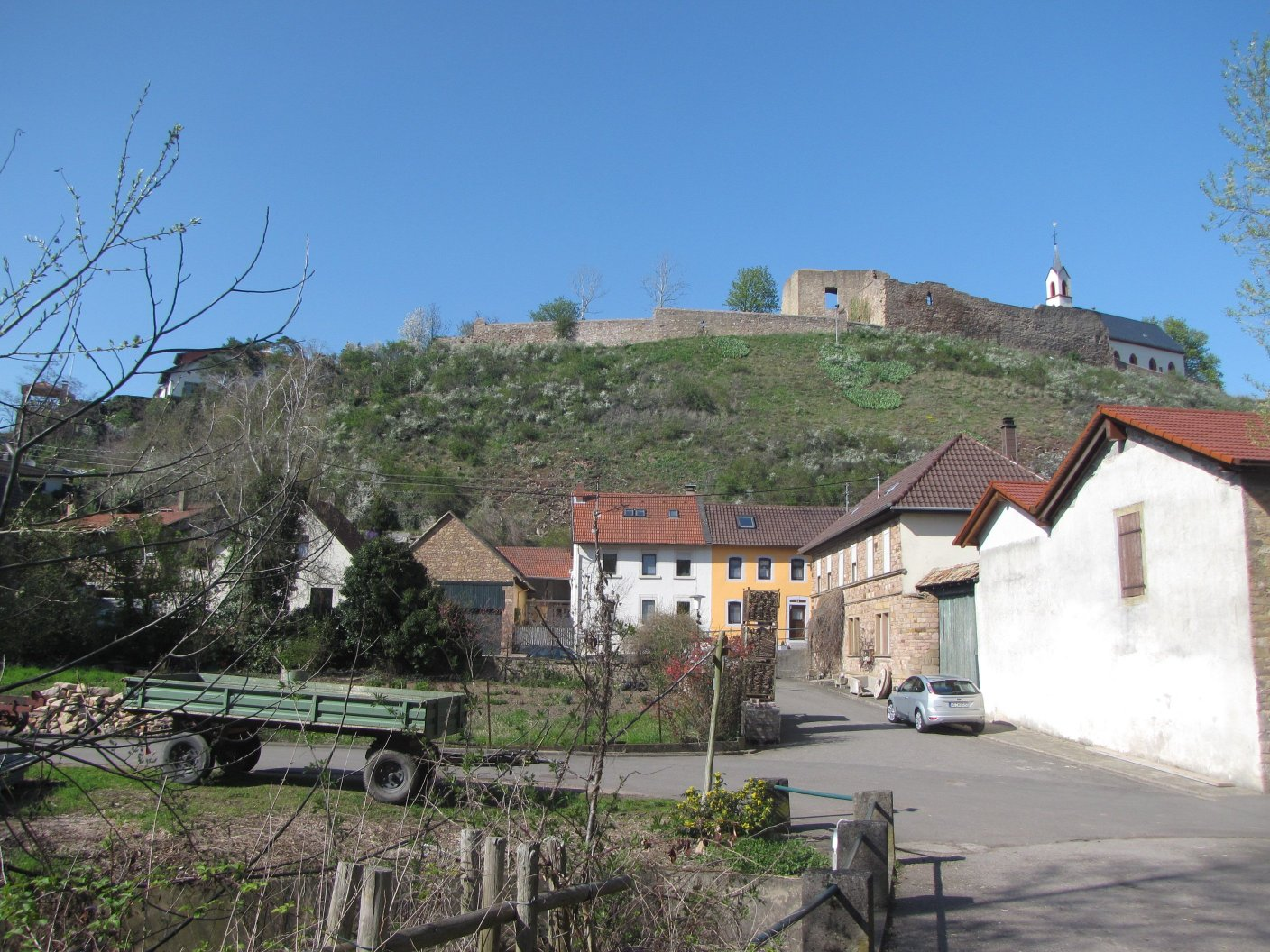

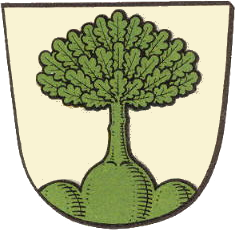
- Coat of arms

- Location of Neu-Bamberg within Bad Kreuznach district
- Interactive map of Neu-Bamberg
- Location within Germany Location within Rhineland-Palatinate
- Coordinates: 49°47′54″N 7°55′21″E
- Country: Germany
- State: Rhineland-Palatinate
- District: Bad Kreuznach
- Municipal assoc.: Bad Kreuznach

Government
  - Mayor (2019–24): Markus Müller

Area
  - Total: 4.56 km^{2} (1.76 sq mi)
- Elevation: 160 m (520 ft)

Population (2025-12-31)
  - Total: 958
  - Density: 210/km^{2} (544/sq mi)
- Time zone: UTC+01:00 (CET)
  - Summer (DST): UTC+02:00 (CEST)
- Postal codes: 55546
- Dialling codes: 06703
- Vehicle registration: KH
- Website: www.neu-bamberg.de

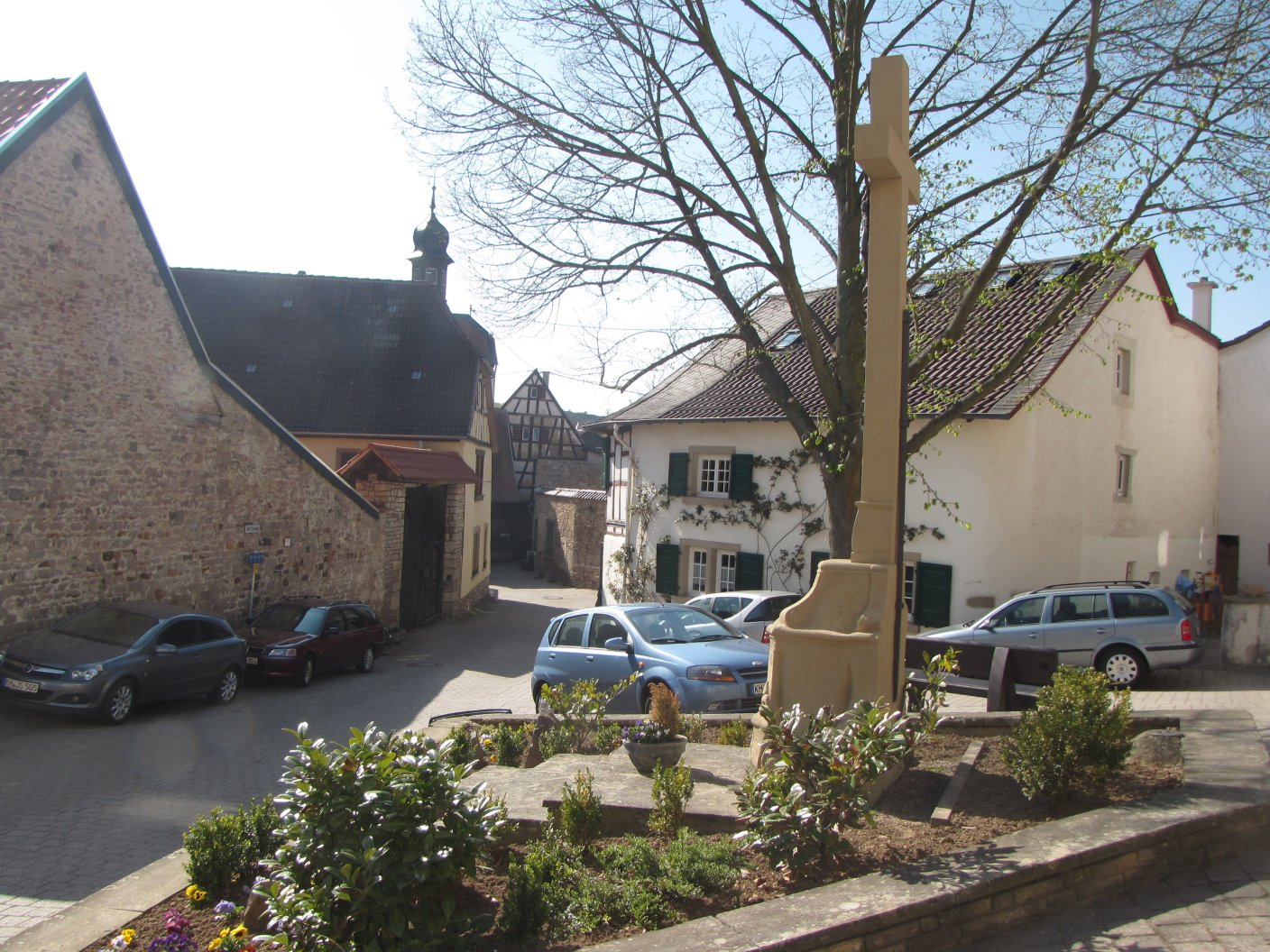
Am Scheep, Neu-Bamberg

Neu-Bamberg is an Ortsgemeinde – a municipality belonging to a Verbandsgemeinde, a kind of collective municipality – in the Bad Kreuznach district in Rhineland-Palatinate, Germany. It belongs to the Verbandsgemeinde of Bad Kreuznach, whose seat is in the like-named town, although this lies outside the Verbandsgemeinde. Neu-Bamberg is a winegrowing village.

== Geography ==
=== Location ===
Neu-Bamberg lies in the Rheinhessische Schweiz (Rhenish-Hessian Switzerland) at the edge of the North Palatine Uplands. The land is hilly and characterized by a mild climate. Flowing through the village is the Appelbach, which once drove three mills in Neu-Bamberg. Of the three quarries that were once found in the village, one is still in business. Neu-Bamberg's elevation, as measured at its defining landmark, the Kandelpforte (clocktower), is 157.23 m above sea level.

=== Neighbouring municipalities ===
Clockwise from the north, Neu-Bamberg's neighbours are the municipalities of Wöllstein, Siefersheim and Wonsheim, all of which lie in the neighbouring Alzey-Worms district, and the municipalities of Fürfeld and Frei-Laubersheim, which both likewise lie in the Bad Kreuznach district. Neu-Bamberg also has an outlying piece of municipal area to the south that borders, again, clockwise from the north, on the municipalities of Fürfeld, Wonsheim (this is also an outlying piece of that municipality's area) and Tiefenthal, another municipality in the Bad Kreuznach district.

=== Constituent communities ===
Also belonging to Neu-Bamberg are the outlying homesteads of An der Weidenmühle, Waltershecke and Weidenmühle.

=== Climate ===
With 1,700 hours of sunshine and only 517 mm of precipitation each year, Neu-Bamberg along with its surrounding countryside is among Germany's warmest and driest regions.

== History ==
While all other places in the Verbandsgemeinde can trace their foundings back to Frankish times and the Early Middle Ages, Neu-Bamberg's roots go back only as far as the Late Middle Ages; it is thus the newest place in the collective municipality. It is possible that Saint Maximin's Abbey in Trier once had landholds in what is now Neu-Bamberg, from which the Raugraves’ landhold arose, to which belonged the porphyry crag in the Appelbach valley, upon which, about 1250, they began building the castle. When the Raugraves founded this Neue Baumburg ("New Baumburg") about 1200 after building the Alte Baumburg ("Old Baumburg"), a new village arose below it. The villagers of nearby Sarlesheim gave their old village up and moved to this new one. Also living in the village were service personnel who had to care for the lordly estate, the livestock, the grazing land and the cropfields. In a 1253 document, the stronghold's existence is witnessed for the first time. On 13 March of that year, Raugrave Heinrich I and his brother Rupprecht II, together with their cousin Konrad I from the Old Baumburg, settled the mutual arrangements for the inheritance rights to their holdings. To distinguish their new comital seat from the old castle, the Alte Baumburg on the heights at the edge of the Alsenz valley, the Raugraves named the new castle Neue Baumburg, from which developed, after various shifts in pronunciation over the centuries, to "Neu-Bamberg". Nevertheless, the 1253 document does not put a name to this place, but rather says: Novum castrum apud Sarlesheim ("new castle near Sarlesheim"). Sarlesheim was a village that lay right near what is now the village of Neu-Bamberg, but later vanished. It had its first documentary mention together with the castle in the Raugraves’ 1253 document. The castle is nowadays a ruin crowning the crag where it was built. It can be seen far beyond the village. Just when the Raugraves, who instituted a constituent county here on their own territory, laid the foundation stone for the complex and completed it is unknown. The document mentioned above was the first to bear witness to its past. It seems clear, though, that by that time, it had been largely completed, at least in its most important parts. Already by the late 13th century, quite a big village had arisen here. The first Jews settled here in 1276 and in 1320, Emperor Ludwig, at Raugrave of Altenbaumburg Georg II's request, afforded the village Imperial protection. The castle and the village that had by now arisen were mentioned by name in a 1285 document. On 1 October of that year, Raugrave Heinrich II transferred to his wife Adelheid, born a countess of Sayn, the castle with all its walls and mountain perimeter as a widow's seat. Another document from 1297 describes the village as a Stadt ("town"). The rulers allowed the townsmen such rights, freedoms and favours as those enjoyed by the Oppenheimers. Furthermore, in 1330, the king granted Neu-Bamberg the right to hold a weekly market on Mondays. This shows that the settlement was a particular candidate for fostering. In 1337, the Raugraves pledged a half share in the castle and the small town of Neu-Bamberg to Archbishop of Mainz Heinrich III against a payment of 1,300 pounds in Heller. In 1369, the Counts Palatine of the Rhine, as well as a few towns, managed to secure entry rights to the half of the town that had remained in the Raugraves’ hands. After 1400, the shares in the ownership of the village were as follows: the Electorate of Mainz held a five-eighths share; the Lords of Daun/Counts of Falkenstein held a one-eighth share; the Counts of Sponheim held a two-eighths share, although by 1403, they had transferred their ownership share to Johann, Marshal of Waldeck. Neu-Bamberg formed an Amt in its own right within the Electorate of Mainz, and its territory also included the villages of Volxheim, Siefersheim, Wöllstein, Gumbsheim and Pleitersheim, along with each one's outlying countryside. Electoral Mainz's Praefectura Neobaumbergensis, as this was called, existed until the French Revolution. It kept its seat at the building that later served as a school and now as the municipal hall. In 1467, Prince-Archbishop-Elector Adolf II of Mainz pledged part of Neu-Bamberg to Count Wirich VII of Daun-Falkenstein. When this part passed by way of inheritance to the Duke of Lorraine in 1661, the then Prince-Archbishop-Elector of Mainz redeemed it in 1663. When a dispute broke out in 1668 with Elector Palatine Karl Ludwig over certain thoroughfare rights through Neu-Bamberg, the Prince-Archbishop-Elector of Mainz sued the Elector Palatine at the Reichskammergericht. The ruling on the dispute was just transferred to the Counts Palatine's declared adversaries, the Margraves of Baden, who quickly assigned the whole Neu-Bamberg landhold to the Archbishop of Mainz. In the disagreement over the local lordship, the castle and the village's fortifications were destroyed. In 1717, Neu-Bamberg was lastingly assigned by treaty in 1717 to the Electorate of Mainz, thereafter becoming an Electoral Mainz Amt to which the Electoral Mainz villages of Volxheim and Siefersheim were subject, as were Wöllstein, Gumbsheim and Pleitersheim, which were jointly ruled with Nassau-Saarbrücken. Mainz held the small castle town until the French conquest in the late 18th century. High jurisdiction is one of the most prominent features of mediaeval and even early-modern lordly power, with the gallows as its hallmark. Hence, it is to be understood that the execution places were to be set up in such exposed, widely visible spots as the Galgenberg ("Gallows Mountain") near Neu-Bamberg, which climbs up steeply right behind the Weidenmühle (mill) on the road going towards Wonsheim. The surroundings up at the hilltop where the gallows stood gives the same grim impression that came to mind when people who lived centuries ago thought of such places: bare, infertile land covered only in sparse grass, above which here and there only scanty shrubs grew. The last of the likely not few times when Neu-Bamberg was pillaged and plundered over its eventful history came in October 1796 by French Revolutionary troops. It lasted two days. Just before this event, the French had been engaging the Austrians nearby. The plunderers took all the village's livestock away with them to their camp. The Revolution of 1848 echoed lastingly in this small castle village, which in 1815 already had 478 inhabitants. An eyewitness, master tinsmith Karl Luttenberger, later told the following:

One evening fire could be seen burning all round on the heights. Our townsman Johann Schlamp III, a freedom-fighter captain, fetched himself the Ries orchestra's big drum out of the dance hall, a wooden spoon from the kitchen and worked his way through the laneways in such a way that he soon had a goodly number of people behind him. Thereupon, a parade to the Schloßberg ("Castle Mountain") formed…

A militia was also formed, with wooden shotguns, who met one Sunday with those from Fürfeld and Wonsheim. The meeting, which had begun with much enthusiasm ended less praiseworthily: during a drinking binge, an argument, and then a fight, broke out. When in the end the movement was beaten by the Prussians, the militiamen wished they had never said or done anything. In 1866, four men from Neu-Bamberg went to war in the Prussian forces against Austria, fighting in the Austro-Prussian War, among them Philipp and Michael Bremmer, who also fought alongside 17 others from the village in the Franco-Prussian War (1870–1871); one of them did not come back from the latter war. It was, however, not only war and other disputes that defined village life at that time. The local stone industry was experiencing decisive growth through technical innovation. In 1898, when the Sprendlingen–Fürfeld railway line was completed, stone could be shipped by rail to its various destinations. Shortly thereafter, trucks were also hauling stone cargoes. Steam engines, which drove the gravel quarries, also made it possible to increase production, as did electricity, which began to be transmitted to the village from Kreuznach in 1917. As early as 1909, Neu-Bamberg also enjoyed the modern convenience of a watermain. The village's sportsmen joined together in 1906 to form the Turn- und Sportverein (gymnastic and sport club). The First World War tore many young men from Neu-Bamberg. Twenty-four of them fell in that war, and six were listed as missing in action.

=== Population development ===
Monzingen's population development since Napoleonic times is shown in the table below. The figures for the years from 1871 to 1987 are drawn from census data:

Year	Inhabitants
1815	478
1835	602
1871	536
1905	646
1939	717

Year	Inhabitants
1950	737
1961	829
1970	829
1987	886
2005	959

== Religion ==
As at 30 November 2013, there are 907 full-time residents in Neu-Bamberg, and of those, 445 are Evangelical (49.063%), 257 are Catholic (28.335%), 1 is Lutheran (0.11%), 1 is Russian Orthodox (0.11%), 10 (1.103%) belong to other religious groups and 193 (21.279%) either have no religion or will not reveal their religious affiliation.

== Politics ==
=== Municipal council ===
The council is made up of 12 council members, who were elected by personalized proportional representation at the municipal election held on 7 June 2009, and the honorary mayor as chairman. The municipal election held on 7 June 2009 yielded the following results:

Year	SPD	CDU	FWG	Total
2009	5	3	4	12 seats
2004	6	3	3	12 seats

=== Mayor ===
Neu-Bamberg's mayor is Markus Müller.

=== Coat of arms ===
The German blazon reads: In Silber auf grünem Dreiberg ein grüner belaubter Eichbaum.

The municipality's arms might in English heraldic language be described thus: Argent in base a trimount upon which an oaktree, both vert.

These are canting arms and they are rooted in the village's history. The village of Neu-Bamberg and its castle originally bore the name Neu-Baumburg ("New Tree Castle") as against the other castle, Baumburg ("Tree Castle"), which stood roughly an hour's ride away on the River Alsenz, and which had likewise been built by the Raugraves in the 12th century, only to be named later Alt-Baumburg ("Old Tree Castle"). Thus, the tree charge in the arms is canting, and so too is the trimount – a charge called a Dreiberg in German heraldry – as this represents the name's suffix, Berg being the German word for "mountain". The leafy oaktree is drawn from a court seal from 1584 and 1589 (a stamp from this seal is in private ownership in Bad Kreuznach) and another from 1657 identified as belonging to Neu-Bamberg in the Hessisches Wappenbuch.

== Culture and sightseeing ==
=== Buildings ===
The following are listed buildings or sites in Rhineland-Palatinate's Directory of Cultural Monuments:

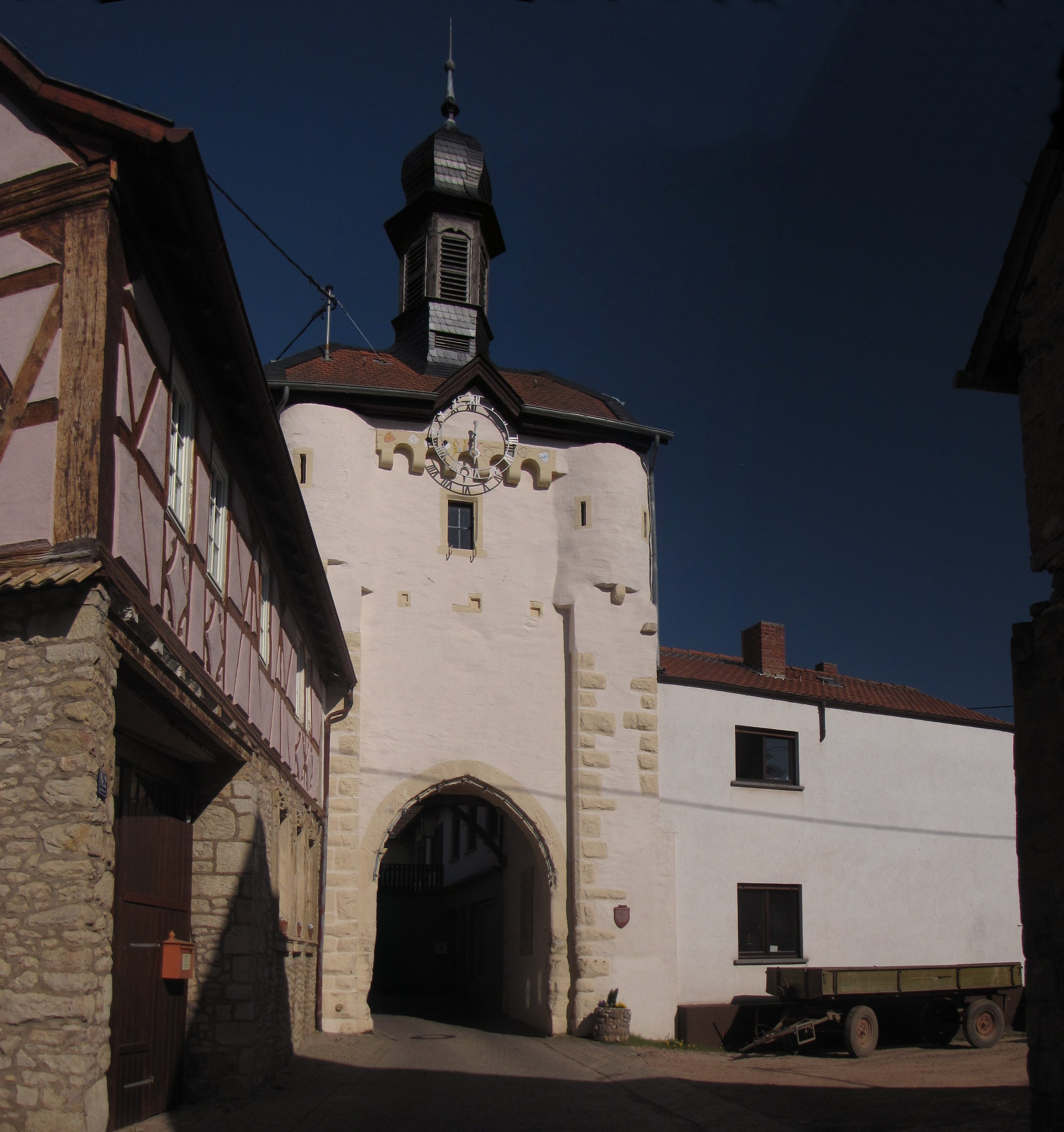
Village fortifications – Gothic Kandelpforte (clocktower)

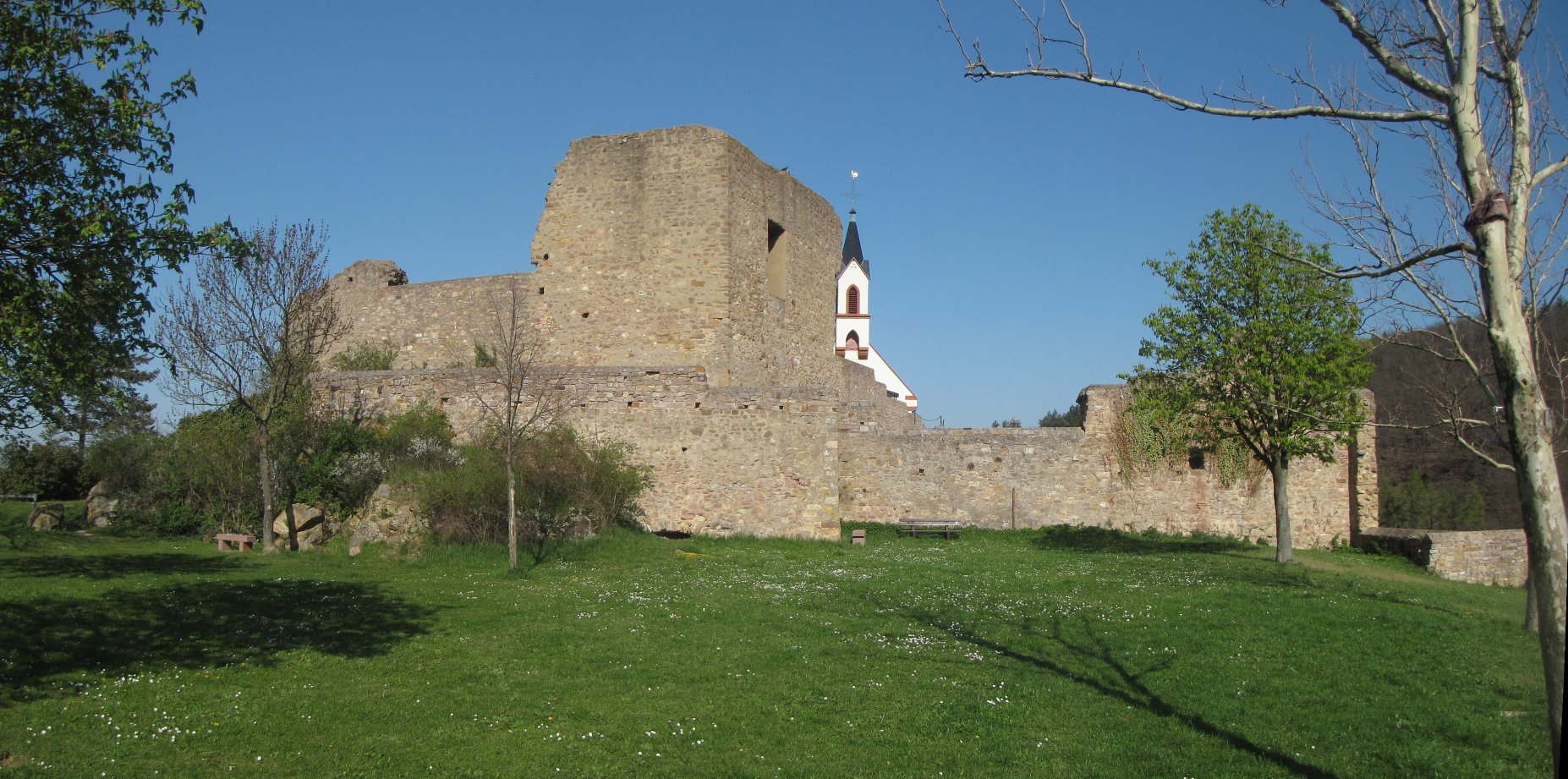
Schloßberg – Neuenbaumburg castle ruin

- Neu-Baumburg ruin, Schloßberg – founded in 1200, destroyed in 1668; heavily restored possibly mediaeval wall remnants; within the precincts the Catholic church
- Evangelical parish church, Alzeyer Straße 57 – formerly Saint George's (St. Georg); quire tower from the latter half of the 13th century, aisleless nave from 1739 and made over in Baroque in 1765, Late Gothic south porch; graveyard with old surrounding wall, gravestones from Gründerzeit and the 1920s
- Schloßgasse 39 – Saint Dionysius's Catholic Church (Kirche St. Dionysius); Gothic Revival aisleless church, 1881/1882
- Village fortifications – after 1320; partly built up with houses (Amtsgasse 31 and others); Gothic Kandelpforte (clocktower), 14th century, Baroque half-hip roof, 18th century, marked 1718, gateway raised in 1906
- Am Scheep – Late Baroque Crucifix, marked 1776
- Am Scheep 1 – three-sided estate; Baroque building with half-hip roof, timber framing plastered, apparently before 1717, conversion 1837
- Am Scheep 2 – three-sided estate; Baroque timber-frame house, partly solid, 18th century, possibly with older parts (16th century?)
- Amtsgasse 1 – Late Baroque timber-frame house, plastered, marked 1777
- Amtsgasse 4 – Late Classicist house, marked 1852
- Amtsgasse 6 – estate complex; Baroque house, essentially from about 1720 and earlier half of the 19th century
- Amtsgasse 8 – former Electoral Mainz Amtshaus; today town hall, Baroque building with mansard roof, about 1720
- Amtsgasse 10/12 – Baroque barn, partly timber-frame, half-hip roof, 18th century, gate complex, marked 1772
- Amtsgasse 11 – three-sided estate; Baroque timber-frame house, partly solid, possibly from about 1700, marked 1774 and 1776
- Amtsgasse 14 – Baroque house, partly solid, earlier half of the 18th century
- Kandelpforte 2 – Baroque timber-frame house, partly solid, earlier half of the 18th century; Baroque gateway arch walling; inscription stone, marked 1621; freestone, marked 1821
- Kandelpforte 4 – gate tower of the village fortifications, Kandelpforte ("Uhrturm", or clocktower), 14th century, Baroque half-hip roof, 18th century, tower clockwork, about 1700, roadway raised in 1906
- Schloßgasse 1 – Baroque timber-frame house, partly solid, marked 1747
- Beside Schloßgasse 1 – in the garden wall a gravestone, about 1743
- Schloßgasse 5 – Baroque timber-frame house, plastered, marked 1717
- Schloßgasse 29 – former water cistern; in castle architectural forms, about 1910
- Schloßgasse 37 – former Catholic rectory, Late Baroque building with mansard roof, about 1770
- Wöllsteiner Straße 30 – Junkermühle, estate complex; Baroque timber-frame house, 18th century, Late Classicist bungalow, marked 1836, house with single roof ridge, about 1830
- Weidenmühle (mill), on Landesstraße 405, on the Appelbach – great complex with stately Late Classicist house, second fourth of the 19th century

=== Clubs ===
The following clubs are active in Neu-Bamberg:

- Aktive Senioren — seniors’ club
- Bauernverein — farmers’ association
- CMV Carneval- und Musikverein — Shrovetide Carnival (Fastnacht) and music club
- Förderverein "Freunde der Feuerwehr" Einh. Ortsgemeinde Neu-Bamberg e.V. — fire brigade promotional association
- Förderverein "Pro Kindergarten Neu-Bamberg e.V." — kindergarten promotional association
- Historische Tanzgruppe — historic dance group
- Katholischer Männerverein — Catholic men's club
- Landfrauenverein — countrywomen's club
- MGV Männergesangverein/Gem. Chor — men's singing club and mixed choir
- Motor- und Sportclub
- Turn- und Sportverein 1906/46 e.V. — gymnastic and sport club
- VdK Ortsgruppe — social advocacy group local chapter
- Verein für Fahr- und Reitsport — driving and riding club

== Economy and infrastructure ==
=== Winegrowing ===
Neu-Bamberg belongs to the "Bingen Winegrowing Area" within the Rheinhessen wine region. Eight winegrowing businesses are active in the village, and the area currently given over to vineyards is 58 ha. Roughly 76% of the grapes are white wine varieties (as at 2007). In 1979, there were still 18 such businesses, and the area then given over to vineyards was 54 ha.

=== Transport ===
Running through Neu-Bamberg is Landesstraße 409 and meeting it in the village centre is Kreisstraße 89. Landesstraße 409 leads to the junction of Bundesstraßen 420 and 428 in neighbouring Frei-Laubersheim. Bundesstraße 420 itself leads to Gau-Bickelheim, where there is an interchange onto the Autobahn A 61 (Koblenz–Ludwigshafen) a short distance along Bundesstraße 50. Bad Kreuznach station in the nearby district seat is served by both the Nahe Valley Railway (Bingen–Saarbrücken) and the Alsenz Valley Railway (Alsenztalbahn).

=== Established businesses ===
- EHL AG (concrete manufacturer)

=== Education ===
- Kindergarten Neu-Bamberg
