= Fürfeld =

- Municipality
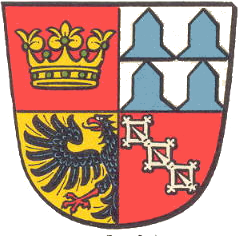
- Coat of arms

- Location of Fürfeld within Bad Kreuznach district
- Interactive map of Fürfeld
- Location within Germany Location within Rhineland-Palatinate
- Coordinates: 49°46′39″N 7°53′35″E
- Country: Germany
- State: Rhineland-Palatinate
- District: Bad Kreuznach
- Municipal assoc.: Bad Kreuznach

Government
  - Mayor (2019–24): Klaus Zahn (FW)

Area
  - Total: 12.48 km^{2} (4.82 sq mi)
- Elevation: 210 m (690 ft)

Population (2025-12-31)
  - Total: 1,702
  - Density: 136.4/km^{2} (353.2/sq mi)
- Time zone: UTC+01:00 (CET)
  - Summer (DST): UTC+02:00 (CEST)
- Postal codes: 55546
- Dialling codes: 06709
- Vehicle registration: KH
- Website: www.fuerfeld.de

Fürfeld (German pronunciation: [ˈfyːɐ̯ˌfɛlt]) is an Ortsgemeinde – a municipality belonging to a Verbandsgemeinde, a kind of collective municipality – in the Bad Kreuznach district in Rhineland-Palatinate, Germany. It belongs to the Verbandsgemeinde of Bad Kreuznach, whose seat is in the like-named town, although this lies outside the Verbandsgemeinde.

== Geography ==
=== Location ===
Fürfeld lies, like Frei-Laubersheim and Neu-Bamberg, in the Rheinhessische Schweiz – Rhenish-Hessian Switzerland – a recreational region, and at the same time it is within Germany's biggest winegrowing region. The village's midpoint is the so-called "Römer" ("Roman"). The village itself is found in the east of the Bad Kreuznach district. The municipal area borders on the neighbouring Alzey-Worms district and the Donnersbergkreis. With regard to physical geography, Fürfeld lies in the foothills of the North Palatine Uplands at the foot of the Eichelberg ("Acorn Mountain"; 321.6 m above sea level) and not far from the Köpfchen ("Little Head"), which at 325 m above sea level is Rhenish Hesse's second highest elevation. Fürfeld is framed by vineyards and wooded land. The village's own elevation is 210 m above sea level, and its municipal area measures 1 248 ha, of which 855 ha is agricultural and 242 ha is wooded.

=== Neighbouring municipalities ===
Clockwise from the north, Fürfeld's neighbours are the municipalities of Frei-Laubersheim, Neu-Bamberg, Wonsheim and Stein-Bockenheim (these last two in the neighbouring Alzey-Worms district), exclaves of Wonsheim and Neu-Bamberg, and the municipalities of Tiefenthal, Niederhausen an der Appel, Winterborn (these last two in the neighbouring Donnersbergkreis), Hochstätten and Altenbamberg.

=== Constituent communities ===
Also belonging to Fürfeld are the outlying homesteads of Biedenthalerhof, Hof Iben, Thalermühle and An der Goldkaut.

== History ==
=== Palaeontology ===
Some 47 million years ago, the subsidence began over a vast area that would eventually form the Mainz Basin, and about 37 million years ago, the depression filled up with seawater, as the forerunner of what is today the Mediterranean Sea stretched that much farther north. This so-called "Rupelian Clay Sea" (Rupeltonmeer in German), in whose former coastal region Fürfeld's municipal area now lies, gradually developed into the so-called "Hydrobia Sea", a sea of brackish water snails. Grazing in the seaweed forests in towards shore were barrel-shaped seacows. In April 1911, Martin Mörsch from Fürfeld announced to the Alzey district office:

I must ask something of you, for while digging earth for a field shed, I found a sea creature's skeleton. So, I ask you for an immediate investigation, or else my digging will be hindered.

The investigation yielded the information that it was the fossilized skeleton of a seacow, Halitherium schinzii, from which, however, the head and tail were both missing.

=== Archaeology ===
The oldest proof of mankind's presence in what is now Fürfeld is an archaeological find that came to light in 1901. It was a "rock hatchet with a pointed butt" from the New Stone Age, which was unearthed in a field known as "In der Teilung". The hatchet is now kept at the museum at Saint Andrew's Foundation (Andreasstift) at Worms. Also from this time come finds from the Linear Pottery culture. These, though, are merely fragments and potsherds, all dug up on the village's southeastern outskirts. Nevertheless, it would seem that these finds point to there having been a Linear Pottery culture settlement here. Assigned to late La Tène times is an ancient Celtic population – "Gaulish" in Roman eyes – who supplied Fürfeld with what is widely regarded as its finest prehistoric find, a necked vase. There have also been Frankish finds. In January 1913 the following was reported from Fürfeld:

Not far from the crossing in the upper village – Hintenherum (roughly "round behind") as they say locally – five human skeletons were dug up during an excavation; 4 lay about a metre deep in the earth, the other only about 50 cm. Near one skeleton lay a loose head, and it was also missing every limb. One skeleton could be unearthed unscathed and was set up in the side building. It is supposedly 181 cm tall. The others were beaten into rubble during digging.

The Jahresbericht der Denkmalpflege im Großherzogtum Hessen ("Yearly Report of Monument Care in the Grand Duchy of Hesse") added:

Found at Wilhelm Mattern II's neighbouring building site were a sword of 73 cm in length, two small metallic objects and a flint…According to a writeup by Prof. Anthes, the discovery mainly deals with five skeletons of which the fifth had as grave goods a great Frankish slashing sword (scramaseax) as well as two little bronze buckles.

On the other hand, the circumstances of what was held to be a "Merovingian row graveyard" were "not fully clear". Whatever it was, it was unearthed in 1952 on Franz Knickwandtöpfe's property, but although it was supposedly a graveyard, no skeletons were dug up. It is thus still an open question as to whether Fürfeld has such an archaeological site.

=== Middle Ages ===
Fürfeld was founded as a clearing settlement. If one puts the actual founding at the time when the provisional lodging was built for the people who cleared the land, then it seems highly likely that Fürfeld's founding came about in 894. Fürfeld thus stands as a notable exception among Rhenish Hesse's municipalities, even if most of them are older than Fürfeld. If one can believe the data given in the Alphabetisches Register rheinhessischer Städte und Gemeinden ("Alphabetical Register of Rhenish-Hessian Towns and Municipalities") in the book Rheinhessen. Landschaft, Wein und Kultur, the municipality of Fürfeld is almost alone in knowing its founding date, sharing this distinction only with Schornsheim and Mainz.

==== Charlemagne's great-great-great-grandson ====
On 13 June 897, a Monday, in Herlisheim, King Zwentibold issued a donation document for Saint Maximin's Imperial Abbey near Trier, which, among other things, gave Fürfeld its first documentary mention, as Furnifeld. This document is preserved in the original and is now kept at the Bibliothèque nationale de France in Paris. King Zwentibold, Charlemagne's great-great-great-grandson, had a reputation that preceded him, for he was known not to be one to avoid a fight. Contemporaries called him brazen, spiteful and violent, and it is reported that once, in the course of a difference of opinion with his chancellor – Archbishop Ratbod of Trier, no less – Zwentibold beat him with a club. The rights laid down in the document were confirmed several times:

- On 1 January 912 in Metz by Charles the Simple (Charles III) of West Francia;
- On 30 November 1023 in Mainz by Henry II, Holy Roman Emperor and German King;
- On 11 January 1026 in Trier by Conrad II, the first Salian on the German throne.

==== High and Late Middle Ages ====
From 960 onwards, the Emichones are encountered in records as having been the Salians’ viscounts in the Nahegau. The Emichones were Vögte of Saint Maximin's Abbey for its far-flung holdings in the Diocese of Mainz, and thus also the holdings on the Nahe, along with Münsterappel-Fürfeld. They were also the Raugraves’ forebears. Saint Maximin's upheld its feudal-lordly claims for centuries, but as of the latter half of the 17th century it was unsuccessful in this pursuit. Thereafter, the local lords in Fürfeld no longer considered themselves Saint Maximin's vassals. The village of Fürfeld itself was neither a Raugravial fief nor land actually owned by the Raugraves. Indeed, the Raugraves’ landhold in Fürfeld might have been no more than one estate, held by a farmer named Schrot, making it a very humble property. For their part, the Raugraves were clearly not satisfied with this, and after the dissolution of the Knights Templar by Pope Clement V at the Council of Vienne, Raugrave Heinrich III ascribed to himself in a 1325 directory of holdings, which still exists in the original, "all the estate that we have at Uben (Iben)" as his property. On 22 January 1362, Raugrave Ruprecht IV sold "Uben and what we had there, godsend, house, meadows, vineyard, cropfields, forest, tithes, tax, water and ways" for 500 pounds to Lord Emerich Rost von Waldeck. Iben was in fact an Electoral-Trier holding, but pledgings and even sales of fiefs were not only possible but even customary as long as the feudal lord was willing. His interests would not be affected as long as whoever held the fief performed his feudal duties.

=== Modern times ===
As early as 1506, at the village level of jurisdiction, out of Germanic/German tradition, division of power between the judiciary and the executive was not the only thing that already existed. The village court lords were in their function not endowed with plentiful power like miniature dictators, but rather were themselves subject to the local legal norms, and even had to face legal consequences for any wrongdoing on their part, too. The 1506 Fürfelder Weistum (cognate with English wisdom, this was a legal pronouncement issued by men learned in law in the Middle Ages and early modern times) clearly bears witness to a certain tense relationship between the court lord and the legal community. The court lords at the time were:

- Junker Philipp Beuser von Ingelheim;
- Junker Conrad von Waldeck, called von Üben;
- Junker Johann Boßen.

In the 1519 Sendweistum, the office of Heimburge is mentioned, and that warrants special attention. The office of Heimburge, who was no lordly official, but rather a representative of the community, shows that the village constitution in Fürfeld exhibited strong collective traits. The municipality under a Heimburge was called a Heimgerede. It is surely not superfluous to refer to such early forms of political organization not exercised by the nobility, because a common preconception has it that Germans only ever learnt democracy by French Revolutionary or, even later, Anglo-Saxon coaching. In April 1521 came the famous confrontation between Martin Luther and Emperor Charles V. In Fürfeld, the proceedings drew much attention, for a Fürfeld villager was known to be Luther's supporter and penfriend. The family von Cronberg, whose castle seat lies north of Frankfurt at the edge of the Taunus, cropped up in Fürfeld not, as was formerly believed, in 1553. much less as late as 1571, but rather as early as 1521. In this year, a man named "Hartmann von Cronberg" acquired the properties of Wiegand von Dienheim. Because in bygone ages the names Hartmann and Hartmut were used haphazardly and interchangeably throughout records, and because in 1521, no other member of the family von Cronberg of a suitable age was living, it seems conclusive that this reference to the buyer meant none other than Hartmut XII (1488-1549), the "follower and fighter of the Lutheran Reformation". For the assumption that Hartmut von Cronberg, Luther's penfriend and reform-minded publicist, subscribed in Fürfeld to the schism then taking place, there is no proof. There is speculation to this effect, but in the 16th century, the church patronage rights were never in the Cronbergs’ hands. Even the notion that Fürfeld had by order become Lutheran is historically unfounded. Indeed, that is still not the case. In 1553, Philipp Melchior Marshal of Waldeck died, and with him, so did the lordly House of Waldeck. His estate in Iben was acquired by Hartmut von Cronberg, "Hartmann von Cronberg's" son, on 29 June 1571 for 3,000 Thaler and 2,000 Rhenish guilders. Having entered into office as court lords in 1577, and later acquiring a further share in the court from the House of Boos von Waldeck in 1701, the Junker of Cronberg are represented in the first and second fields of the municipal coat of arms. In July 1704, Johann Niclas von Cronberg, the last Lord Cronberg, died, and the lordship in Fürfeld was now taken over by Johann Ferdinand von Kerpen in December of that same year. Iben had now escheated to the overlord – Saint Maximin's Abbey – who then enfeoffed the family von Schmidtburg with it. It should be pointed out that the village lord did not actually own all the ground within the whole municipality. The Lord of Kerpen – from 1732 to 1788 this was Lothar Franz Christoph – had at his personal disposal, as personal property, only somewhat more than 20 ha of land. A whole series of noble families shared ownership over the rest, having given out their lands in hereditary or temporal pledges. A 1750 book of landholds lists the following as knightly families:

- Boos von Waldeck
- von Schmidtburg
- von Koppenstein
- von Isselbach
- von Carben
- von Lohausen
- von Buseck
- von Schomburg-Degenfeld

Other sources resembling cadastral land registers from the Darmstadt State Archive name further families, with the year here in each case corresponding to the reference therein:

- von Gagern (1741)
- von Hunolstein (1741)
- von Buttlar (1722)
- von Wallbrunn (1757)
- von Sturmfeder (1763)
- von Esch zu Langwiesen (1790)
- von Lehrbach (1722)
- von Ketschau (1722)
- von Murach (1781)
- von Dhern (1718)

In 1788, Fürfeld got a new village lord – for the last time. Lothar Franz Christoph, who had died on 28 December was succeeded by his son, Anselm Franz Georg von Kerpen. "The first onslaught of the Revolutionary Army led by Custine in 1792 messed up Southwest Germany's whole Kleinstaaterei" and introduced the "destruction of the small powers that were incapable of living as a state". Apart from the already "fascistoid" mode of expression, these sentences are worth noting because it seems that the renowned constitutional historian Fritz Hartung (1883-1967) appears utterly to overlook that most of these "small powers that were incapable of living as a state" – for example Fürfeld – had by the time of their "destruction" existed for several centuries, a duration that has thus far not been matched by any stately body on German soil since that time. The political philosopher and representative purveyor of Revolutionary ideology, Jean-Jacques Rousseau himself (1712-1778) had in a lighter moment (1761) written that no other polity could match the German in wisdom. For the former Imperial knightly self-governing political body that Fürfeld hitherto had been, the Revolutionary French annexation of the German lands on the Rhine's left bank marked a new phase in history, one in which it still finds itself today, for the imposition of a new administrative system on the French model made the village into an incorporated municipality unencumbered by any feudal lord.

=== Jewish history ===
Fürfeld had a Jewish community until about 1938 or 1940. It was established sometime in the 16th to 18th centuries. The earliest record of Jewish inhabitants in Fürfeld comes from 1551, when the old court register listed somebody named Meyer Jud (Jud being a form of the word Jude, meaning "Jew"). Furthermore, in 1553, somebody named Joseph Jud was named. It is likely that at that time at least one of those two had already been buried on the Eichelberg, for in 1572, the court register mentions das "jüdische Grap" am Eychelberg ("the Jewish grave on the Eichelberg"). In 1633, two local Jews were named who had to pay a toll at the tollgate in Alsenz. In 1722, the Jewish community comprised 31 persons, breaking down into 13 men, 12 women, four boys and two girls. The community included a number of Jews who lived nearby in Frei-Laubersheim. In the 19th and early 20th centuries, the number of Jewish inhabitants in Fürfeld developed as follows:

Year	Jewish inhabitants	Remarks
1801	101	
1828	108	
1830	105	
1861	145	12.0% of all together 1,207
1871	161	
1880	110	10.0% of all together 1,103
1900	93	7.8% of total
1910	78	6.7% of all together 1,168

One member of Fürfeld's Jewish community fell in the First World War, Alfons Scharff (b. 2 August 1894 in Frei-Laubersheim, d. 30 September 1918). In the way of institutions, the Jewish community had a synagogue, a religious school, a mikveh and a graveyard. A further graveyard was to be found in neighbouring Frei-Laubersheim. To fulfil the community's religious requirements, a teacher of religion was hired who also worked as the shatz and the shochet. The post had a high turnover and was forever appearing in the employment advertisements. The community belonged to the regional rabbinate in Bingen. Two members of Fürfeld's Jewish community fell in the First World War, Sgt. Salomon Kahn (b. 8 February 1885 in Fürfeld, d. 8 October 1918) and Bernhard Strauß (b. 29 August 1887 in Fürfeld, d. 8 September 1917). About 1924, when there were still 68 persons in the Jewish community (6.0% of all together 1,130), the community heads were Salomon Brück, Joseph Goldschmidt and Ferdinand Strauß from Frei-Laubersheim. Working as teacher, cantor and shochet since 1891 had been Moses Mayer, and he continued in these functions until 1926. In 1923/1924, he taught five children in religion. Among Jewish clubs were the charitable club Chevra Kadisha (חברה קדישא), led from 1924 to 1932 by Nathan Kahn with 25 members, the Israelite Women's Club (led in 1924 by Hermann Kahn's wife with 10 members, and in 1932 by Nathan Kahn's wife) and the nursing association, led from 1924 to 1932 by Nathan Kahn. In 1932, the community heads were Salomon Bruch (1st), Joseph Goldschmidt (2nd) and Ferdinand Strauß (3rd). By then, Schama Neumann, from Poland, was working as teacher, cantor and shochet in the community. After Adolf Hitler and the Nazis seized power in 1933, every member of the Jewish community moved away or emigrated over the next six years in the face of antisemitic laws that stripped Jews of their rights, the economic boycott and other repressive measures. By 1933, there were 56 persons in the Jewish community (4.8% of all together 1,162). According to writer Arnsberg, 15 of the Jews from Fürfeld emigrated to the United States, four went to South America and one each to the Netherlands, the United Kingdom and Palestine. Others moved within Germany, especially to Frankfurt and Mainz. Schama Neumann, mentioned above, was already locked up in the Osthofen concentration camp in 1933, but by 1937 he had evidently been released for he then moved to Frankfurt. In early 1939, there were still 15 Jewish inhabitants in Fürfeld, but before this year had ended, all had left the village. According to the Gedenkbuch – Opfer der Verfolgung der Juden unter der nationalsozialistischen Gewaltherrschaft in Deutschland 1933-1945 ("Memorial Book – Victims of the Persecution of the Jews under National Socialist Tyranny") and Yad Vashem, of all Jews who either were born in Fürfeld or lived there for a long time, 26 were killed during Nazi persecution (birthdates in brackets):

1. Hugo Bach (1882)
2. Hugo Glas (1897)
3. Max Glas (1896)
4. Else Goldschmidt (1920)
5. Bertha (Betty) Hamburger (1878)
6. Henriette Hirsch née Glas (1879)
7. Alfred Kahn (1891)
8. Bertha Kahn née Scheuer (1868)
9. Emilie Kallmann née Strauss (1868)
10. Henrietta Selma Landau (1882)
11. Nathan Landau (1878)
12. Rudolf Landau (1885)
13. Erna Marx (1900)
14. Heinrich Metzler (1905)
15. Siegfried Metzler (1907)
16. Adolf Neuberger
17. Clemens Neuberger
18. Else Reinhard (1921)
19. Marianne (Jenny) Reinhard née Heimann (1878)
20. Pauline Reinhard (1872)
21. Jenny Steiermann née Strauss (1891)
22. Leopold Sternheimer (1859)
23. Adele Strauss née Reinhard (1907)
24. Leopold Strauss (1863)
25. Dora Weichsel née Wolf (1878)
26. Berta Wolf (1881)

==== Synagogue ====
It is believed that originally there was a prayer room for Jewish worship at a private house. The first synagogue was built about 1760. A precise year is known from the chuppah stone (wedding stone) that was built into the wall when a new synagogue was built. Even some of the furnishings from the old synagogue were moved into the new one, whose foundation stone was laid on Rathausstraße on 3 July 1894. The plans are believed to have been drawn up by Wöllstein architect Weis. The new synagogue was consecrated with a great parade, a concert and a ball with the Mainz 1888 Infantry Regiment's musical corps participating from 9 to 11 August 1895. The financing for the new building came from, among others, two Jewish families from Fürfeld then living abroad, the family Teutsch and Julius Wolf's family, who lived in Paris (who gave 1,000 and 100 ℳ respectively) and Heinrich Strauß who now lived in Frankfurt (150 ℳ). In 1928, the synagogue was renovated with the help of funds donated by another expatriate, Hermann Goldschmidt, who now lived in Los Angeles. A magazine published by the Centralverein deutscher Staatsbürger jüdischen Glaubens (CV-Zeitung) reported on 31 August 1928: "Hermann Goldschmidt from Los Angeles (California), an old Fürfelder (Hesse), declared himself ready upon arrival in his old homeland to have the synagogue renovated at his expense in memory of his parents." On Kristallnacht (9–10 November 1938), the synagogue was desecrated and vandalized by Brownshirts and other Nazi supporters. Jewish residents were even forced to participate in the destruction. In 1939, the synagogue building passed into the local agri-business cooperative's ownership and in the years that followed it was used for storage. In 1952, the Catholic church community bought the building. In 1959, it was torn down and a house was built on the lot. An information board is fastened onto it. The synagogue stood at Rathausstraße 13.

=== "Bawettche" ===
The Sprendlingen–Fürfeld railway line, run by the Süddeutsche Eisenbahn-Gesellschaft (SEG; "South German Railway Company"), known locally as "Bawettche" (apparently after the railway's first passenger), was built between May 1887 and October 1898, with the first stretch of the line, from Sprendlingen by way of Badenheim to Wöllstein coming into service on 11 October 1888. The local physical geography thwarted any expansion for a while, until the builders gave up the idea of boring a tunnel through the Hexenkanzel ("Witches’ Pulpit") and instead chose to build the line with a great many curves. This involved five iron bridges with supporting breadths of up to 20 m and two further brick and concrete bridges. To grade the railway properly, 1 000 m³ of earth had to be moved in the rural cadastral area "Am Schwarzen Kreuz" near Fürfeld. Unfortunately, this process destroyed one of Rhenish Hesse's oldest artistic monuments, the eponymous "Black Cross". On 5 October 1898, trains began running into Fürfeld. The line served to link the quarries near Frei-Laubersheim and Neu-Bamberg, to transport agricultural products such as root vegetables and wine and to carry the Wöllstein brick industry's products. The railway station in Fürfeld was eye-catching with its handsome station building and goods shed with a loading ramp and a water crane. A two-track locomotive shed with a repair workshop completed the ferrovial equipment. Fürfeld remained the terminus even though there were plans to extend the railway to join with the Alsenz Valley Railway (Alsenztalbahn). SEG transferred ownership to the state of Rhineland-Palatinate in 1953, and the old Deutsche Bundesbahn then ran the service on it, acquiring actual ownership in 1959, whereupon it shut the line down on 31 March of that year. Indeed, the section from Wöllstein to Fürfeld had already been closed and the tracks torn up in late 1958. The stretch from Sprendlingen to Wöllstein, though, remained in service until 31 July 1973.

=== Population development ===
Fürfeld's population development since Napoleonic times is shown in the table below. The figures for the years from 1871 to 1987 are drawn from census data:

Year	Inhabitants
1815	875
1835	1,314
1871	1,080
1905	1,190
1939	1,090

Year	Inhabitants
1950	1,367
1961	1,293
1970	1,389
1987	1,449
2005	1,567

=== Municipality's name ===
The name "Fürfeld" means "Pinefield" and might originally have described a field with pines in it. Pines form a genus (Pinus) of conifers, and the root from which springs the first syllable in Fürfeld's name can be found in almost all Germanic languages, including Modern High German (Föhre, which still means "pine") and English (fir, although this has undergone a shift in meaning to the related genus Abies). The German word Föhre exists alongside the word Kiefer, believed to have originally been a corruption of the word Kienföhre ("resinuous pine"), which is only recorded as far back as the 16th century.

== Religion ==
As at 30 September 2013, there are 1,546 full-time residents in Fürfeld, and of those, 729 are Evangelical (47.154%), 558 are Catholic (36.093%), 1 belongs to the Alzey Free Religious Community (0.065%), 2 are Russian Orthodox (0.129%), 13 (0.841%) belong to other religious groups and 243 (15.718%) either have no religion or will not reveal their religious affiliation.

== Politics ==
=== Municipal council ===
The council is made up of 16 council members, who were elected by personalized proportional representation at the municipal election held on 7 June 2009, and the honorary mayor as chairman. The municipal election held on 7 June 2009 yielded the following results:

Year	SPD	CDU	WG	Total
2009	9	3	4	16 seats
2004	7	5	4	16 seats

"WG" means Wählergruppe – "voters’ group".

=== Mayor ===
Fürfeld's mayor is Klaus Zahn.

=== Coat of arms ===
The municipality's arms might be described thus: Quarterly, first gules a crown Or garnished vert, second vair in two rows, third Or an Imperial Eagle dimidiated sable armed and langued of the first, and fourth gules three arming buckles flory conjoined in bend argent.

The charges seen here in this composition are the same as what was seen in the Fürfeld court seal (example from 1614). The village belonged to the Rhenish Knighthood (Rheinische Ritterschaft), which explains the halved ("dimidiated") Imperial Eagle (and possibly a two-headed one, as one whole head can be seen) in the third field. Fürfeld also belonged to the Iben Estate (Hof Iben), where the Marshals of Waldeck, called Ueben, owned a castle (the buckles in the fourth field represent this). As for the first and second fields, the castle later passed to the Lords of Kronberg, who bore quarterly arms, too, but with these first and second fields repeated in the third and fourth, alternating with those above.

=== Town partnerships ===
Fürfeld fosters partnerships with the following places:

- Crissey, Saône-et-Loire, France since 2002
- (Germany) Brachstedt, Saalekreis, Saxony-Anhalt

In the latter case, the partnership was an outgrowth of one that already existed between Fürfeld's and Brachstedt's respective Evangelical church communities.

== Culture and sightseeing ==
=== Buildings ===
The following are listed buildings or sites in Rhineland-Palatinate's Directory of Cultural Monuments:

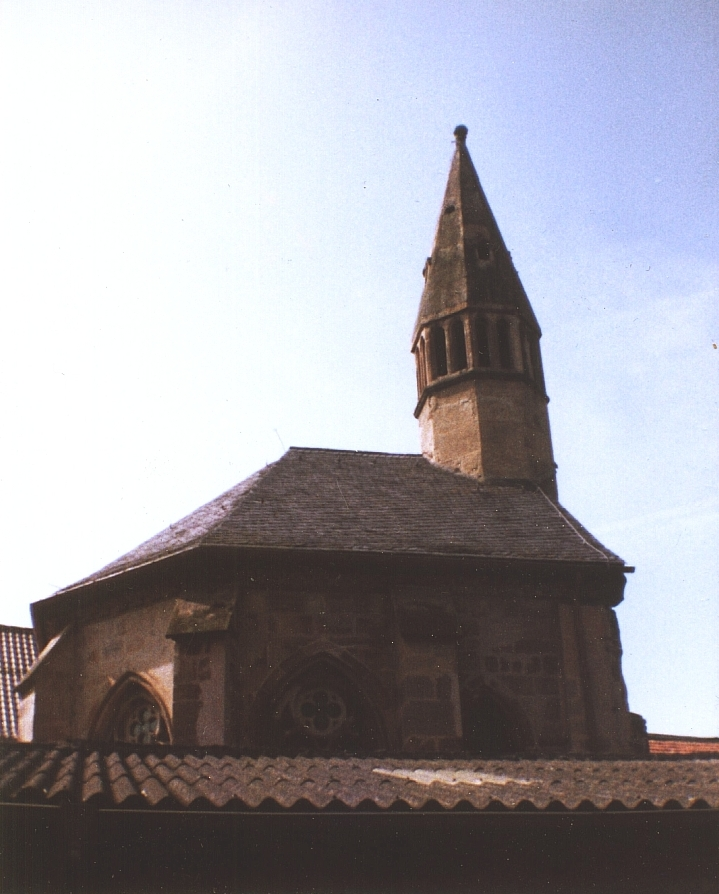
Hof Iben – Gothic quire of the former castle chapel

- Evangelical church, Rathausstraße 21 – Late Baroque-Early Classicist building with hip roof, 1774–1776, former Gothic quire tower, extra floors built on before 1840
- Saint Joseph's and Saint Giles's Catholic Church (Kirche St. Josef und St. Aegidius), Kreuzstraße 18 – Late Baroque aisleless church, 1774–1776, architect Peter Reheis, Eschweiler
- Bennstraße 1 – Catholic rectory, Late Baroque building with hipped mansard roof, about 1770
- Bennstraße 5 – school, Classicist plastered building, about 1830
- Hochstätter Straße 2 – house, Baroque timber-frame house, partly solid, possibly about 1700
- Hochstätter Straße 10 – Baroque timber-frame house, partly solid, about 1700, gateway with timber-frame storage
- Kreuznacher Straße 10 – house, Gründerzeit sandstone-framed clinker brick building, about 1890
- Kreuzstraße 13 – Baroque timber-frame house, plastered, about 1700, former gateway with timber-frame superstructure
- Kreuzstraße 21 – Baroque house, marked 1740, essentially possibly about 1600, segmental arch framing about 1770/1780
- Mittlere Bennstraße 2 – Evangelical rectory; Gründerzeit sandstone-block building, about 1895
- Mittlere Bennstraße 5 – estate complex; Baroque timber-frame house, plastered, about 1700
- Rathausstraße 5 – house, Gründerzeit clinker brick building, about 1890
- Rathausstraße 8 – house, Baroque bungalow, about 1700
- Rathausstraße 12 – town hall; Late Classicist plastered building, 1840
- Rathausstraße 15 – four-sided estate; long Late Baroque house, last third of the 18th century
- Schulstraße 1 – school; two-winged Late Gründerzeit sandstone-block building, marked 1900–1901
- Near Schulstraße 1 – post-Baroque sandstone Crucifix, marked 1808
- Hof Iben – former moated castle; Gothic quire of the former castle chapel, about 1240; former quire arch walled up, Baroque forms from the mid 18th century, Romanesque access way; Baroque bridge statue, 18th century; former castle house, essentially mediaeval
- Jewish graveyard (monumental zone) – area with 98 gravestones from 1836 to 1936 laid out about 1700/1850
- Thalermühle (mill), on Landesstraße 410, on the Appelbach – 18th and 19th centuries, four-sided complex; Late Baroque building with half-hip roof, about 1770/1780, newer quarrystone and brick buildings

== Economy and infrastructure ==
=== Winegrowing ===
Fürfeld belongs to the "Bingen Winegrowing Area" within the Rhenish Hesse wine region. In business in the village are 15 winegrowing operations, and the area of vineyard planted is 57 ha. Some 64% of the wine grown here (as at 2007) is white wine varieties. In 1979, there were still 48 winegrowing operations, and the vineyard area, at 66 ha, was slightly more than what it is now.

=== Transport ===
Fürfeld lies on Bundesstraße 420. Northeast of the village runs the Autobahn A 61. The railway station in Fürfeld was the end of the line running from Sprendlingen to Fürfeld. It was closed in 1960. Serving nearby Hochstätten is a railway station on the Alsenz Valley Railway (Alsenztalbahn).

== Famous people ==
=== Sons and daughters of the town ===
- Ludwig Baum (1800–after 1871), Grand-Ducal Hessian mayor at Fürfeld (1845–1871), Member of the second chamber of the Landstände (parliament) of the Grand Duchy of Hesse at Darmstadt (1856–1862)
- Heinrich Steitz (1907–1998), Evangelical theologian

=== Famous people associated with the municipality ===
- Franz Josef Brunck (1787–1848), Grand-Ducal Hessian mayor at Fürfeld (1814–1836), Member of the second chamber of the Landstände of the Grand Duchy of Hesse at Darmstadt (1826–1848), Member of the Frankfurt Parliament (1848)
