= Siefersheim =

- Municipality
- Coat of arms

- Location of Siefersheim within Alzey-Worms district
- Interactive map of Siefersheim
- Location within Germany Location within Rhineland-Palatinate
- Coordinates: 49°47′N 7°57′E
- Country: Germany
- State: Rhineland-Palatinate
- District: Alzey-Worms
- Municipal assoc.: Wöllstein

Government
  - Mayor (2019–24): Annerose Kinder

Area
  - Total: 6.28 km^{2} (2.42 sq mi)
- Elevation: 153 m (502 ft)

Population (2025-12-31)
  - Total: 1,269
  - Density: 202/km^{2} (523/sq mi)
- Time zone: UTC+01:00 (CET)
  - Summer (DST): UTC+02:00 (CEST)
- Postal codes: 55599
- Dialling codes: 06703
- Vehicle registration: AZ
- Website: www.siefersheim.de

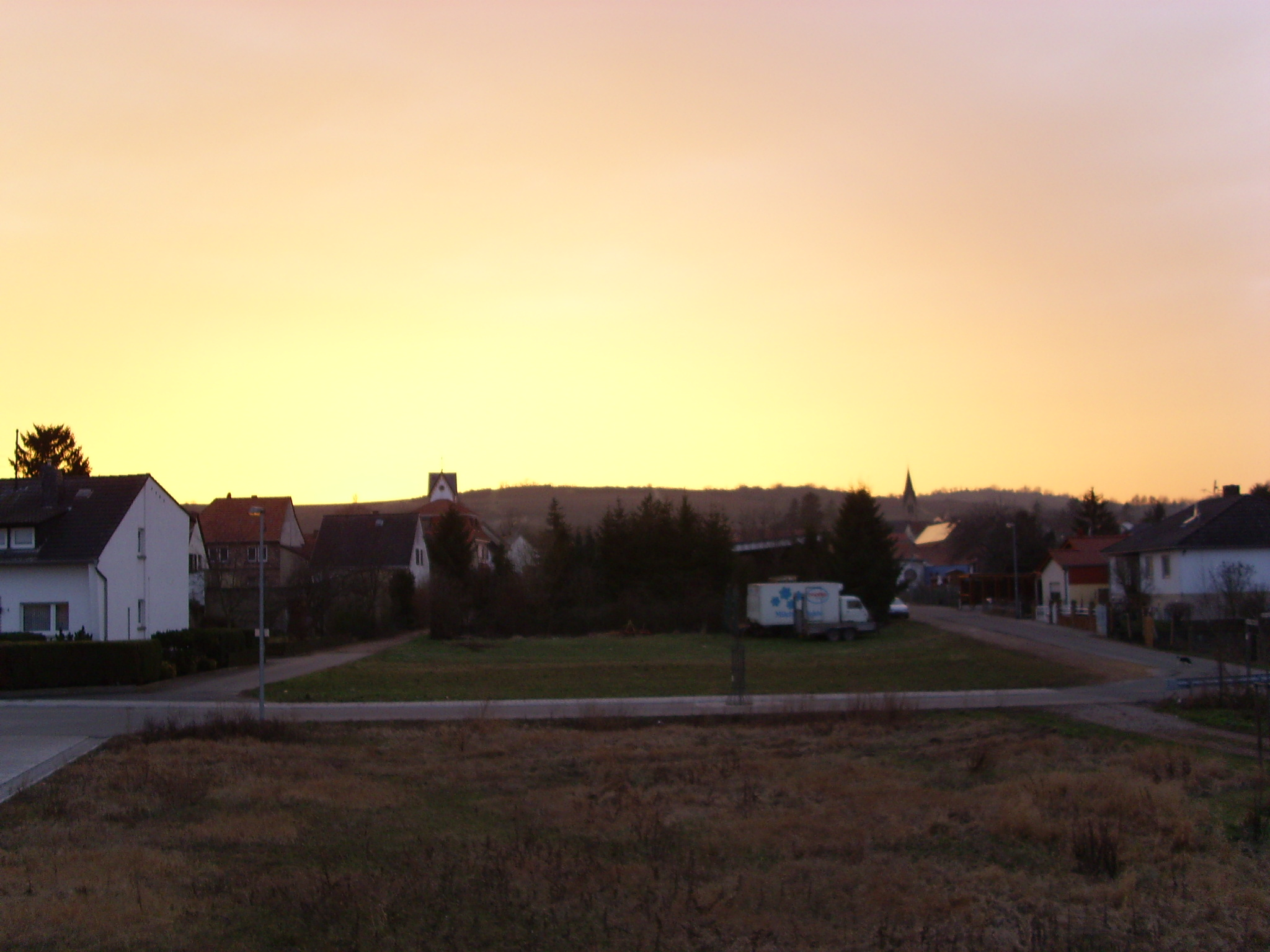
Siefersheim at sunset

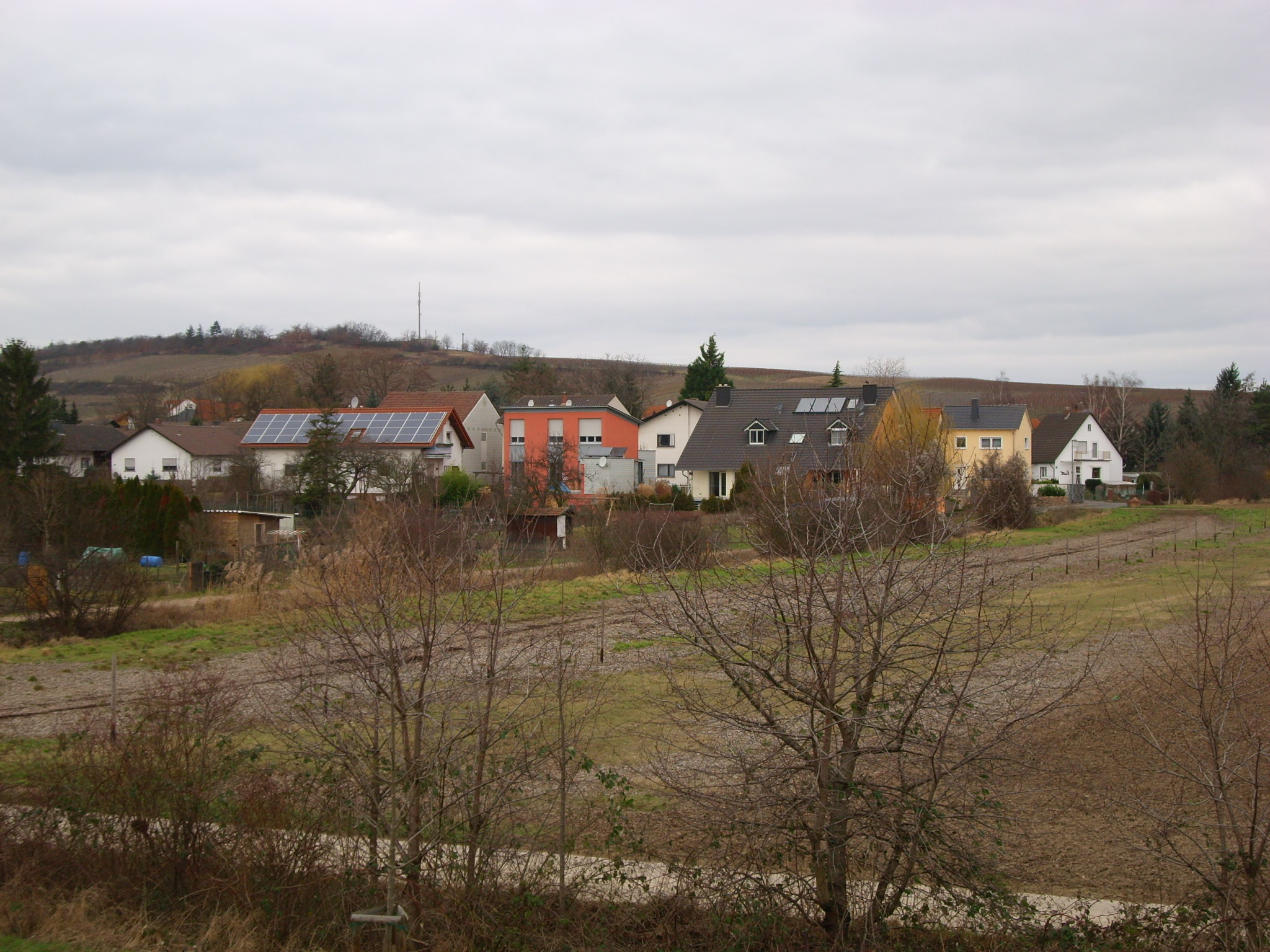
Siefersheim

Siefersheim (German pronunciation: [ˈziːfɐshaɪm]) is an Ortsgemeinde – a municipality belonging to a Verbandsgemeinde, a kind of collective municipality – in the Alzey-Worms district in Rhineland-Palatinate, Germany.

== Geography ==
=== Location ===
The municipality lies at Rhenish Hesse’s western edge and belongs to the Verbandsgemeinde of Wöllstein, whose seat is in the like-named municipality.

=== Neighbouring municipalities ===
Siefersheim’s neighbours are Wonsheim, Wöllstein, Eckelsheim, Gumbsheim and Neu-Bamberg.

== Politics ==
=== Municipal council ===
The council is made up of 16 council members, who were elected by majority vote at the municipal election held on 7 June 2009, and the honorary mayor as chairman.

=== Mayor ===
The current mayor is Annerose Kinder.

=== Coat of arms ===
The municipality’s arms might be described thus: Per pale argent a tower gules, in base a bunch of grapes vert, and sable a lion rampant Or armed, langued and crowned gules.

== Economy and infrastructure ==
Siefersheim is characterized by Rhenish-Hessian winegrowing and can boast of having a VDP winery in the Weingut Wagner-Stempel, as well as of having a DLG-recommended winery in the Weingut "Alte Schmiede".

=== Education ===
- Grundschule Siefersheim (primary school)
