= Wollstein =

Wollstein may refer to:

- Wöllstein, Germany
- Wöllstein (Verbandsgemeinde), Germany
- Wolsztyn, Poland
