= Bockenheim =

Bockenheim may refer to:

- Bockenheim (Frankfurt am Main), a city district of Frankfurt am Main, Germany
- Bockenheim an der Weinstraße, a municipality in Rhineland-Palatinate (Bad Dürkheim), Germany
- Stein-Bockenheim, a municipality in Rhineland-Palatinate (Alzey-Worms), Germany
- Bockenheim, a former town merged in 1794 into Sarre-Union, Alsace, France
