= Friedrich Christian Laukhard =

German writer (1757–1822)

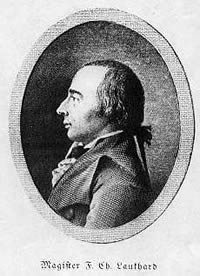
- Friedrich Christian Laukhard
- Born: 7 June 1757; Wendelsheim, Germany
- Died: 28 April 1822 (aged 64); Bad Kreuznach, Germany

Friedrich Christian Laukhard (7 June 1757 – 28 April 1822) was a German novelist, philosopher, historian and theologian. From 1783 to 1794 he volunteered in the Prussian army as a musketeer. During the War of the first coalition his regiment (v. Thadden) campaigned in Valmy. Laukhard's military diary is of great interest for historical research on the Prussian army and the French revolutionary wars. Due to his licentious and extrovert lifestyle, "Magister Laukhard" soon became a notorious figure.

== Life ==
=== Youth ===
Laukhard was born in Wendelsheim, where his father Philipp Burkhard Laukhard served as pastor. He was trained in Latin, Hebrew and Philosophy from an early age. Laukhards father, himself a Pantheist, was a great admirer of Christian von Wolff and Baruch Spinoza, always encouraging Laukhard to query canonical dogmata to become a freethinker. Though his intellectual breeding was highly excitatory, his parents completely disregarded any further educational surveillance. As a result, Laukhard got in bad company and became an alcoholic in early years.

=== Studies ===
At his father's urging, Laukhard began to study theology at the university of Gießen in 1771. After his graduation in 1774, Laukhard served for a while as Vikar, but he lost this position quickly on account of his overly liberal sermons. In 1781, supported by his father's friend Johann Salomo Semler, he resumed his studies in Halle. In 1783 he finally earned his doctorate and served for short while at the University of Halle.

=== Army ===
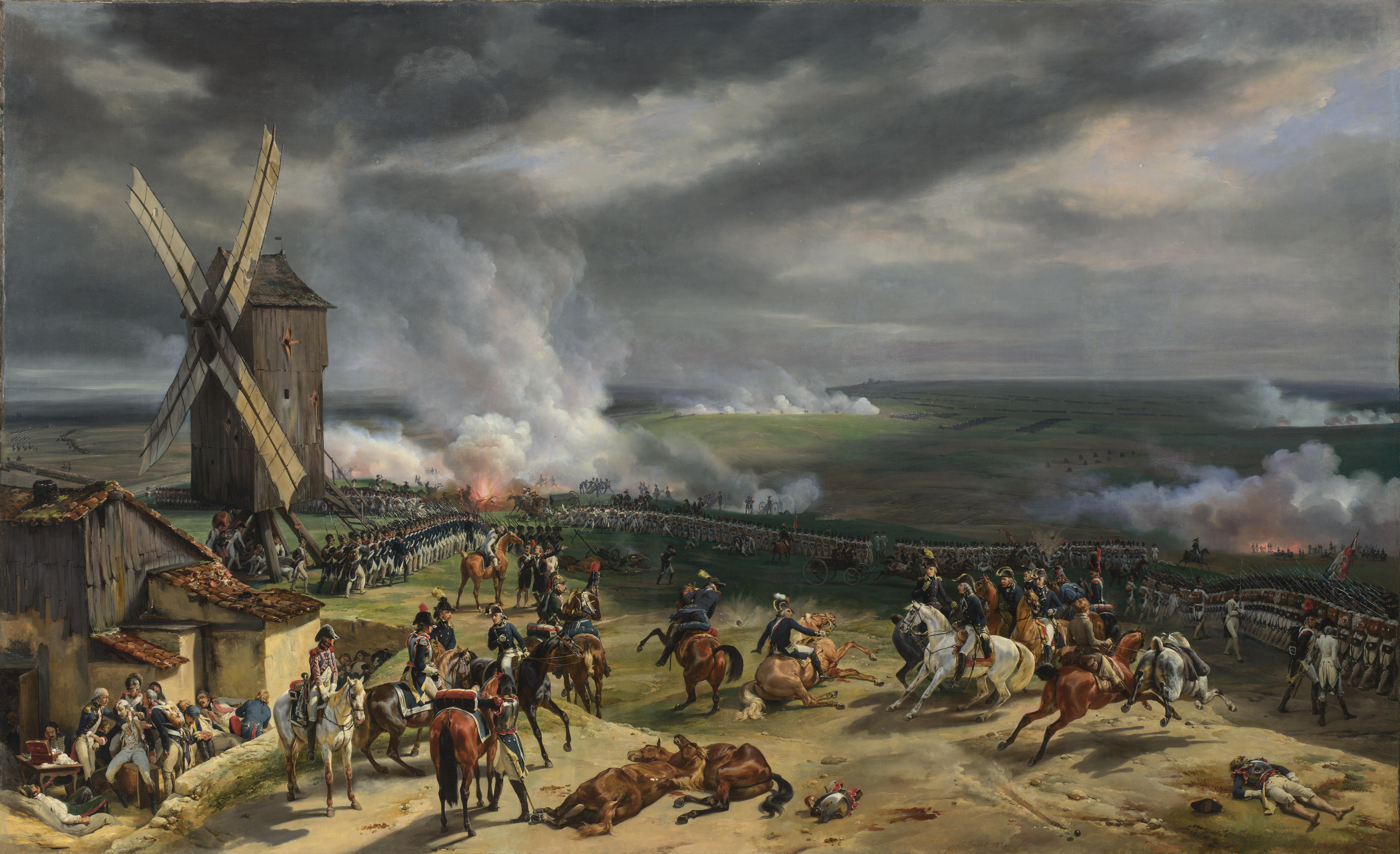
Battle of Valmy

Due to his bohemian and costly lifestyle, Laukhard got plunged in debt and had to enter the Prussian army. In 1792 he took part in the battle of Valmy. In 1794 he was captured by the French and henceforth became a member of the Sansculottes.

== Influence ==
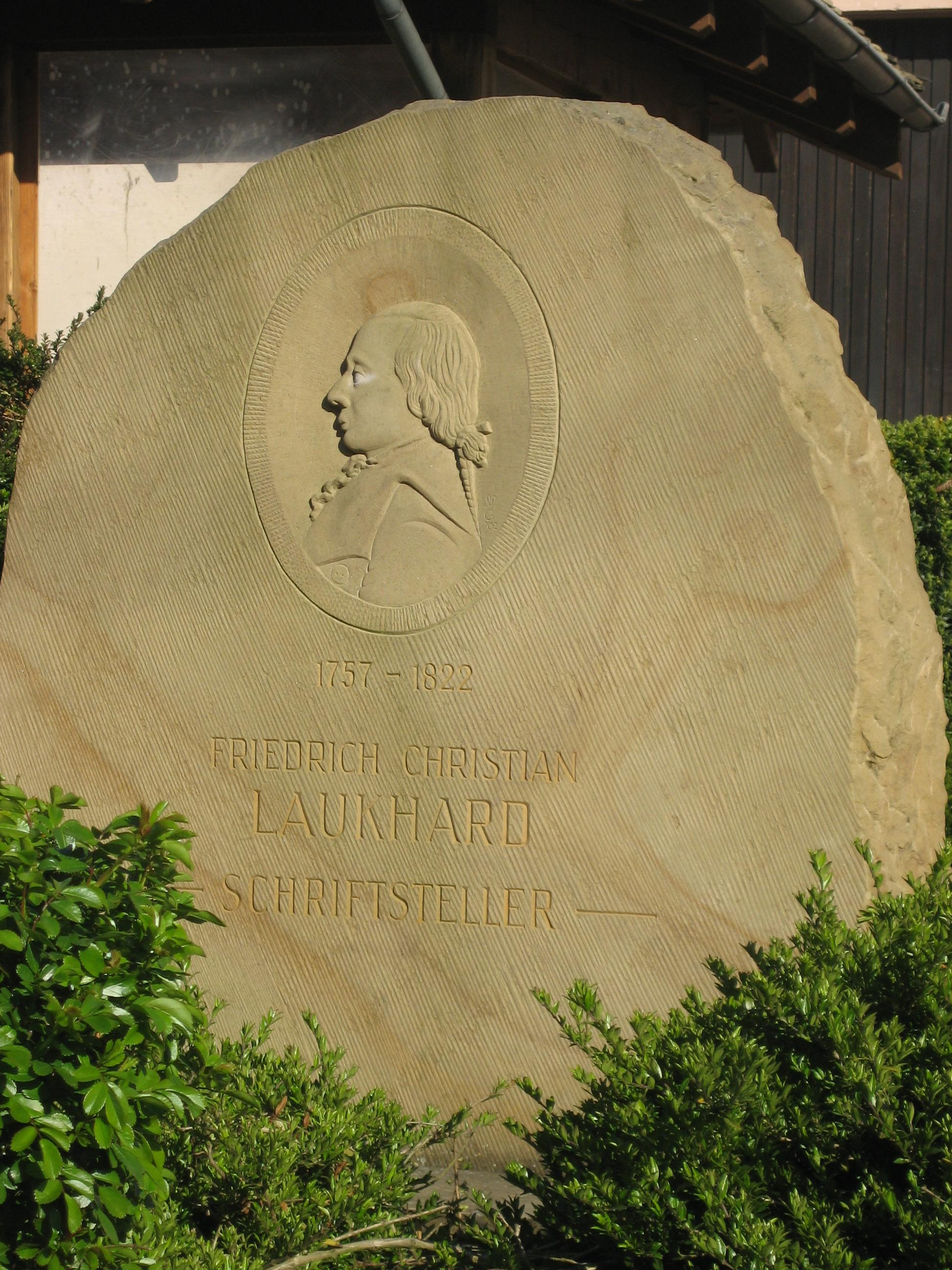
Laukhard Memorial Wendelsheim

Laukhards autobiographic writings are of historical interest. In his lifetime he made a contribution to the spread of humanist ideas and thus can be seen as part of the enlightenment movement.

== Works ==
- Leben und Schicksale von ihm selbst beschrieben, 5 Bände, 1792–1802
- Der Mosellaner- oder Amicisten-Orden nach seiner Entstehung, inneren Verfassung und Verbreitung auf den deutschen Universitäten dargestellt, Halle 1799
- Leben und Schicksale von ihm selbst beschrieben, herausgegeben von Karl Wolfgang Becker, 1989 Koehler u. Amelang, München, ISBN 3-7338-0052-4
- F. C. Laukhard, ein abenteuerliches Leben während der Französischen Revolution, herausgegeben von Franz Dobmann, 1969 Heidenheimer Verlagsanst., ASIN B0000BS9K8
- Leben und Taten des Rheingrafen Carl Magnus, den Joseph II. auf zehn Jahre ins Gefängnis nach Königstein schickte, 1798, herausgegeben von Lothar Baus, Asclepios Verlag, ISBN 3-935288-19-0
- Friedrich Christian Laukhard (1757–1822) : Band I: Nachrichten aus der wirklichen Welt - Studien zu Laukhards politischen Romanen. Band II: Kommenti ... und Materialien. Band III: Ausgewählte Texte, hg. von Christoph Weiss, Karl Richter, Gerhard Sauter, Gerhard Schmidt-Henkel, Röhrig Universitätsverlag GmbH, ISBN 3-86110-005-3
- Friedrich Christian Laukhard: Ein bemerkenswerter Wendelsheimer, von Jakob Schwind und Richard Wilhelm, Rheinhessische Druckwerkst., ISBN 3-87854-169-4
