= Eckelsheim =

- Municipality
- Coat of arms

- Location of Eckelsheim within Alzey-Worms district
- Interactive map of Eckelsheim
- Location within Germany Location within Rhineland-Palatinate
- Coordinates: 49°48′N 07°59′E
- Country: Germany
- State: Rhineland-Palatinate
- District: Alzey-Worms
- Municipal assoc.: Wöllstein

Government
  - Mayor (2019–24): Rainer Mann

Area
  - Total: 4.92 km^{2} (1.90 sq mi)
- Elevation: 137–155 m (449–509 ft)

Population (2025-12-31)
  - Total: 413
  - Density: 83.9/km^{2} (217/sq mi)
- Time zone: UTC+01:00 (CET)
  - Summer (DST): UTC+02:00 (CEST)
- Postal codes: 55599
- Dialling codes: 06703
- Vehicle registration: AZ
- Website: www.eckelsheim.de

Eckelsheim is an Ortsgemeinde – a municipality belonging to a Verbandsgemeinde, a kind of collective municipality – in the Alzey-Worms district in Rhineland-Palatinate, Germany.

== Geography ==
=== Location ===
The village lies in Rhenish Hesse, and it belongs to the Verbandsgemeinde of Wöllstein, whose seat is in the like-named municipality. It lies within the recreational area known as Rheinhessische Schweiz (Rhenish-Hessian Switzerland). The village has some 550 inhabitants and an area of 4.92 km², making it the Verbandsgemeinde’s smallest municipality.

== Environment and geology ==
For many years, this “Wine and Herb Village” has been known for its intensive work on and for the natural environment. Many herb events take place from spring to autumn. From a geological standpoint, the village has long been said to be of particular interest. Rather sensational was the 35-million-year-old sea cliff unearthed in an Eckelsheim gravel pit a few years ago.

== History ==
=== Awards ===
In 2005, Eckelsheim achieved first place in the countrywide contest Unser Dorf hat Zukunft (“Our Village Has a Future”), and since then has called itself Golddorf. This was made possible by a yearlong effort by many people not only to uphold the village’s charm and character, but also to actively shape and further develop it.

== Politics ==
=== Municipal council ===
The council is made up of 12 council members, who were elected at the municipal election held on 7 June 2009, and the honorary mayor as chairwoman.

The municipal election held on 7 June 2009 yielded the following results:

	SPD	CDU	FWG	Total
2009	3	2	7	12 seats
2004	2	4	6	12 seats

=== Coat of arms ===
The municipality’s arms might be described thus: Per bend azure a wheel spoked of six argent and Or a bend gules surmounted by three eagles displayed of the second.

The wheel likely stands for the Lords of Bolanden, who held Eckelsheim until 1360, and the lower half is Lorraine’s coat of arms, a reference to when sovereignty over the village passed to François III Étienne, Duke of Lorraine (who later became Holy Roman Emperor). The arms were conferred in 1960.

In 1955, another coat of arms was proposed, based on the only known village seal from 300 years earlier. This would have been “Lozengy Or and gules” (that is, a diamond pattern in gold and red).

== Culture and sightseeing ==
=== Buildings ===
==== Beller Kirche ====
Standing as a symbol of Eckelsheim is the ruin of the Beller Kirche, a Late Gothic church. Since 1982, many cultural events have been being held in the summer months. In 2002, the historic Bellermarkt (market) was held once again around the Beller Kirche ruin; it had last been held in 1902.

== Economy and infrastructure ==
=== Winegrowing ===
Eckelsheim is characterized by winegrowing, at which many family businesses have already been working for many generations. At the Sommer-Inn, winemakers, clubs or others take turns inviting visitors to eat, drink and be merry.
