= Neu-Baumburg Castle =

Ruined Castle in Neu-Bamberg, Rhineland-Palatinate, Germany

- Burg Neu Baumburg
- Neu-Bamberg
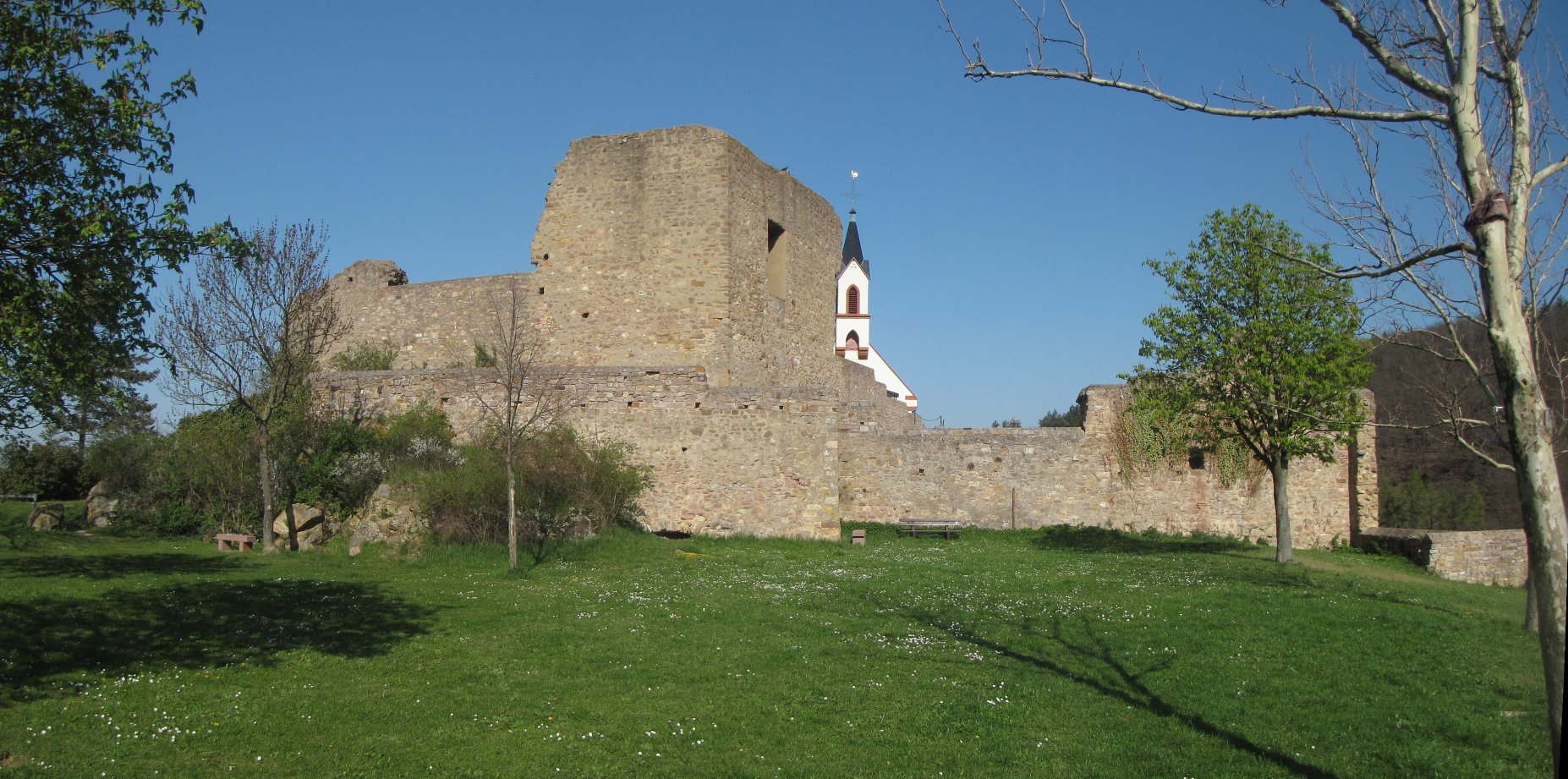

Site information
- Type: Medieval castle

Location
- Coordinates: 49°47′52″N 7°55′30″E

Site history
- Built: 1253
- In use: 1253-1668

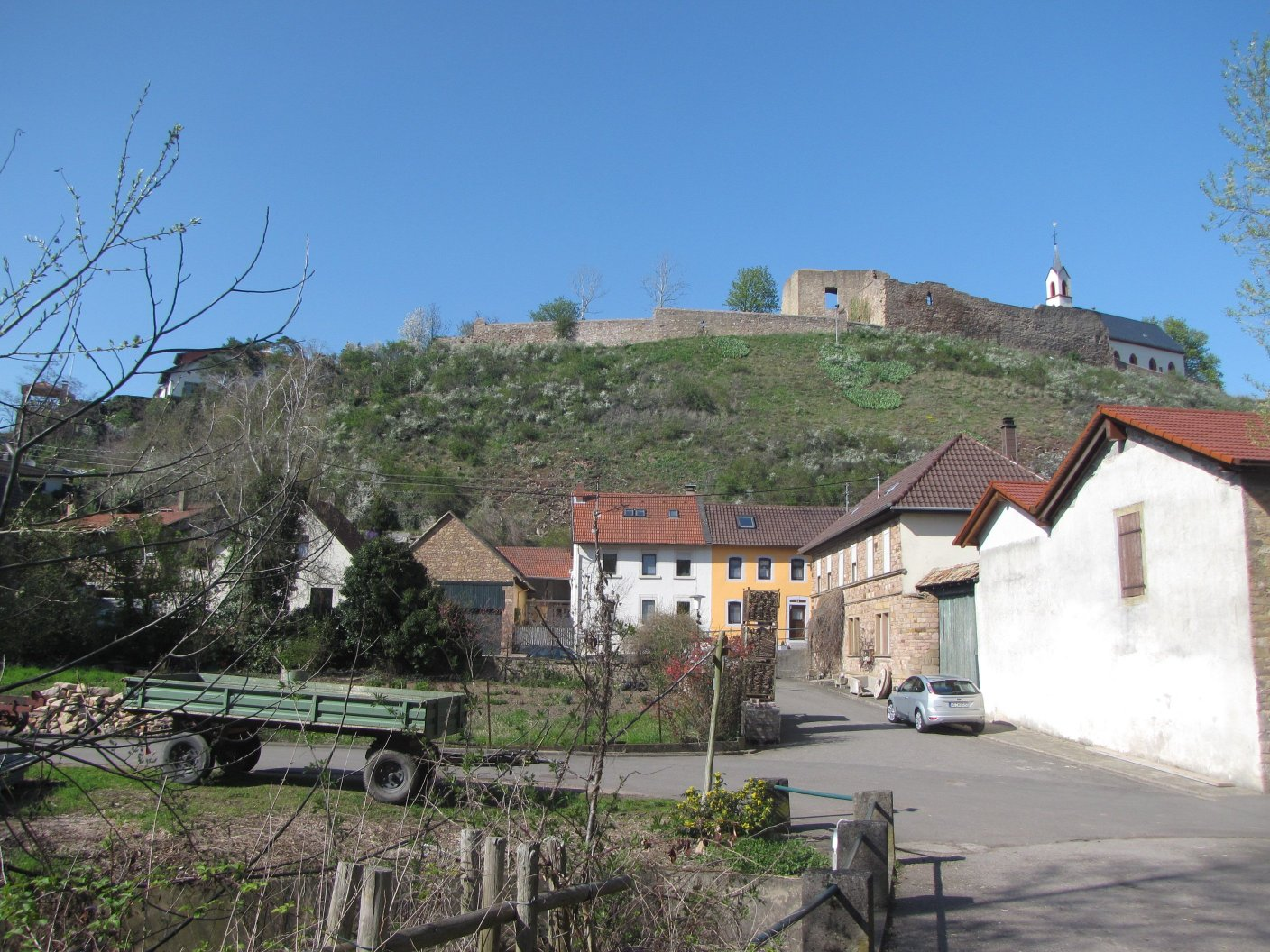

Neu-Baumburg Castle (German: Burg Neu Baumburg, also Neu-Bamberg, Neuenbaumburg, Novobeimburg and Neubamberg) is a ruined castle in the town of Neu-Bamberg in Rhineland-Palatinate, Germany.

The castle was first constructed in 1253 by the Raugrafen family, and by 1283 was held by Henry II Raugrafen. The castle was later destroyed in 1668 by Elector Charles I Louis of the Palatinate. It received renovations in 1970.

== Sources and external links ==
- www.burgeninventar.de in German only.
