= Wendelsheim =

- Municipality
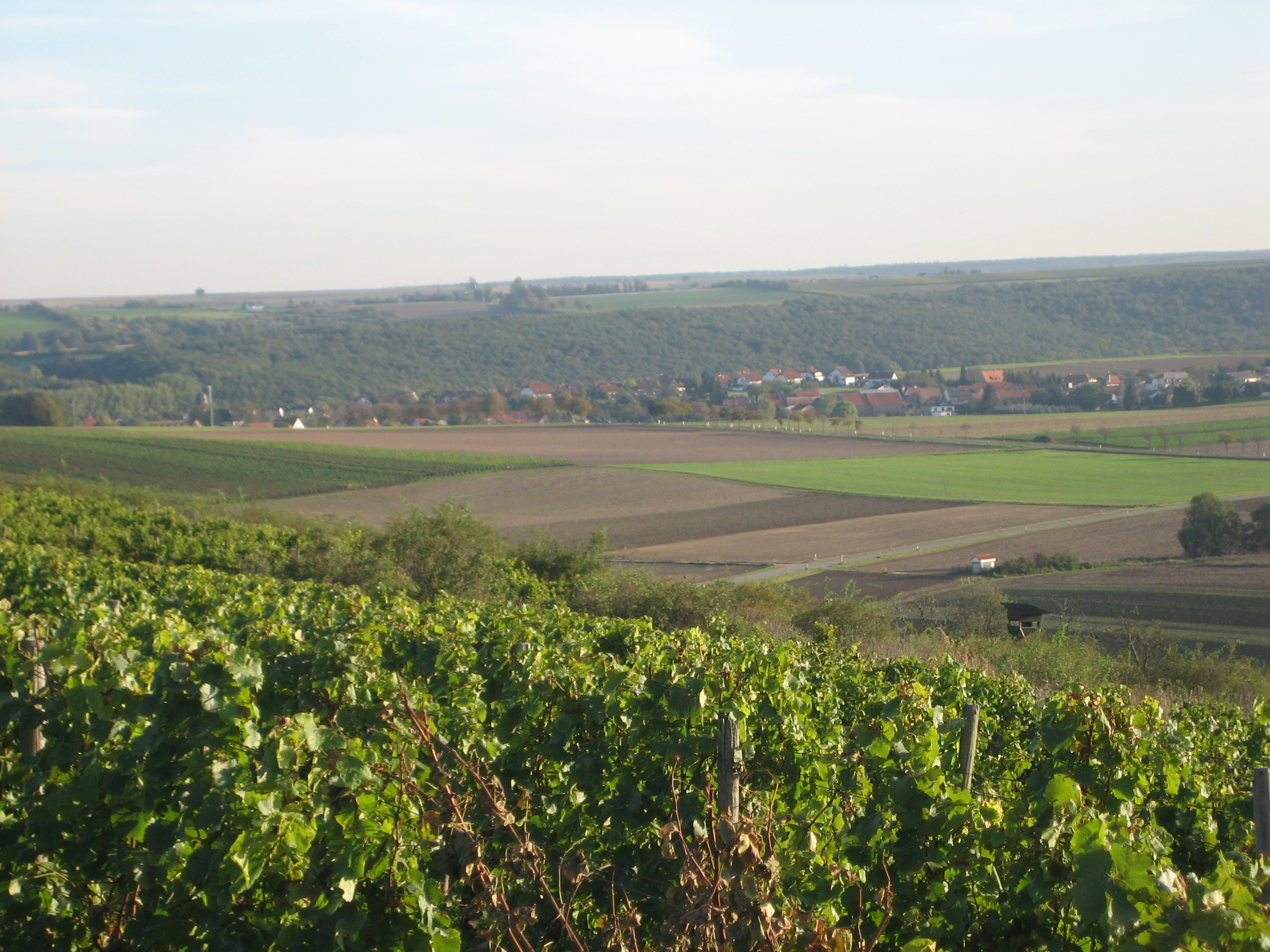

- Coat of arms

- Location of Wendelsheim within Alzey-Worms district
- Interactive map of Wendelsheim
- Location within Germany Location within Rhineland-Palatinate
- Coordinates: 49°50′08″N 08°03′05″E
- Country: Germany
- State: Rhineland-Palatinate
- District: Alzey-Worms
- Municipal assoc.: Wöllstein

Government
  - Mayor (2019–24): Christine Knuth (SPD)

Area
  - Total: 12.56 km^{2} (4.85 sq mi)
- Elevation: 127 m (417 ft)

Population (2025-12-31)
  - Total: 1,440
  - Density: 115/km^{2} (297/sq mi)
- Time zone: UTC+01:00 (CET)
  - Summer (DST): UTC+02:00 (CEST)
- Postal codes: 55234
- Dialling codes: 06734
- Vehicle registration: AZ
- Website: wendelsheim-rhh.de

Wendelsheim is an Ortsgemeinde – a municipality belonging to a Verbandsgemeinde, a kind of collective municipality – in the Alzey-Worms district in Rhineland-Palatinate, Germany.

== Geography ==
=== Location ===
As a winegrowing centre, Wendelsheim lies in Germany's biggest winegrowing district, in the middle of the wine region of Rhenish Hesse, 10 km west of Alzey. It belongs to the Verbandsgemeinde of Wöllstein, whose seat is in the like-named municipality. Through the municipality flow the rivers Wiesbach and Finkenbach. These two brooks drove several watermills in the Late Middle Ages.

== History ==
In 766, Wendelsheim (Wenilsheim) had its first documentary mention in the Lorsch codex (other sources refer to a donation document for Fulda Abbey from 841). Celtic finds, however, establish that the area was already settled in prehistory. As with all places whose names end in —heim (cognate with English home), it might have been a Frankish settlement.

Wendelsheim might well have been among the Waldgraves’ oldest landholdings. It is supposed that it belonged to the estate of office with which the Emichonen, as the Salians’ “undercounts”, had been furnished. From 1370, it is evident that Count Palatine Ruprecht I held landlordly rights to Wendelsheim. About 1380, the village was pledged to Count Palatine Ruprecht the Young, and from 1438 to 1452 to Count Palatine Ludwig IV.

In 1398 and 1409, Wendelsheim was a Comital-Palatine fief held by Rhinegrave Johann von Dhaun zu Rheingrafenstein. Mediaeval sources describe the Rhinegrave as the village's and municipal area's highest Vogt and rightful chief justice.

From 1475 until the French Revolution, lordship over Wendelsheim was held by the Counts of Salm.

In the wake of the 1803 Reichsdeputationshauptschluss, Wendelsheim passed in 1815 to the Grand Duchy of Hesse-Darmstadt. After the Second World War, the municipality was assigned to the state of Rhineland-Palatinate.

== Politics ==
=== Municipal council ===
The council is made up of 16 council members, who were elected at the municipal election held on 7 June 2009, and the honorary mayor as chairman.

The municipal election held on 7 June 2009 yielded the following results:

	SPD	CDU	FWG	Total
2009	6	4	6	16 seats
2004	6	5	5	16 seats

=== Mayors ===
- Jakob Schwind (until 2004)
- Hans-Ludwig Kilian (2004–2019)
- Christine Knuth (since 2019)

=== Coat of arms ===
The municipality's arms might be described thus: Tierced in mantle, Or a lion rampant gules crowned argent, gules semé of crosses pattée of the first two salmon haurient addorsed of the third, and azure diapered a fess of the third.

The lion rampant on the dexter (armsbearer's right, viewer's left) side comes from the arms once borne by the Waldgraves, and the silver fess (that is, horizontal stripe) on the sinister (armsbearer's left, viewer's right) side from those once borne by the Rhinegraves. The two salmon are a canting charge for the Counts of Salm (Salm means “salmon” in German), who were Wendelsheim's last lordly rulers. The arms are first known from a seal dating from 1775.

=== Town partnerships ===
- Messein, Meurthe-et-Moselle, and Ablis, Yvelines France
- (Germany) Wendelsheim, Tübingen, Baden-Württemberg

The other Wendelsheim is actually a Stadtteil of Rottenburg am Neckar.

== Culture and sightseeing ==
- Schinderhanneshöhle (cave)
- Vineyard cottages and trulli
- Bannmühle, Hasselmühle, Rübenmühle (old mills)
- Salmsches Schloss – built in 1758 by Rhinegrave Carl Magnus
- Teufelsrutsch crag (Devil's Slide)
- St. Martin's Church (St.-Martin-Kirche)
- Friedrich Christian Laukhard’s birth house and memorial to him
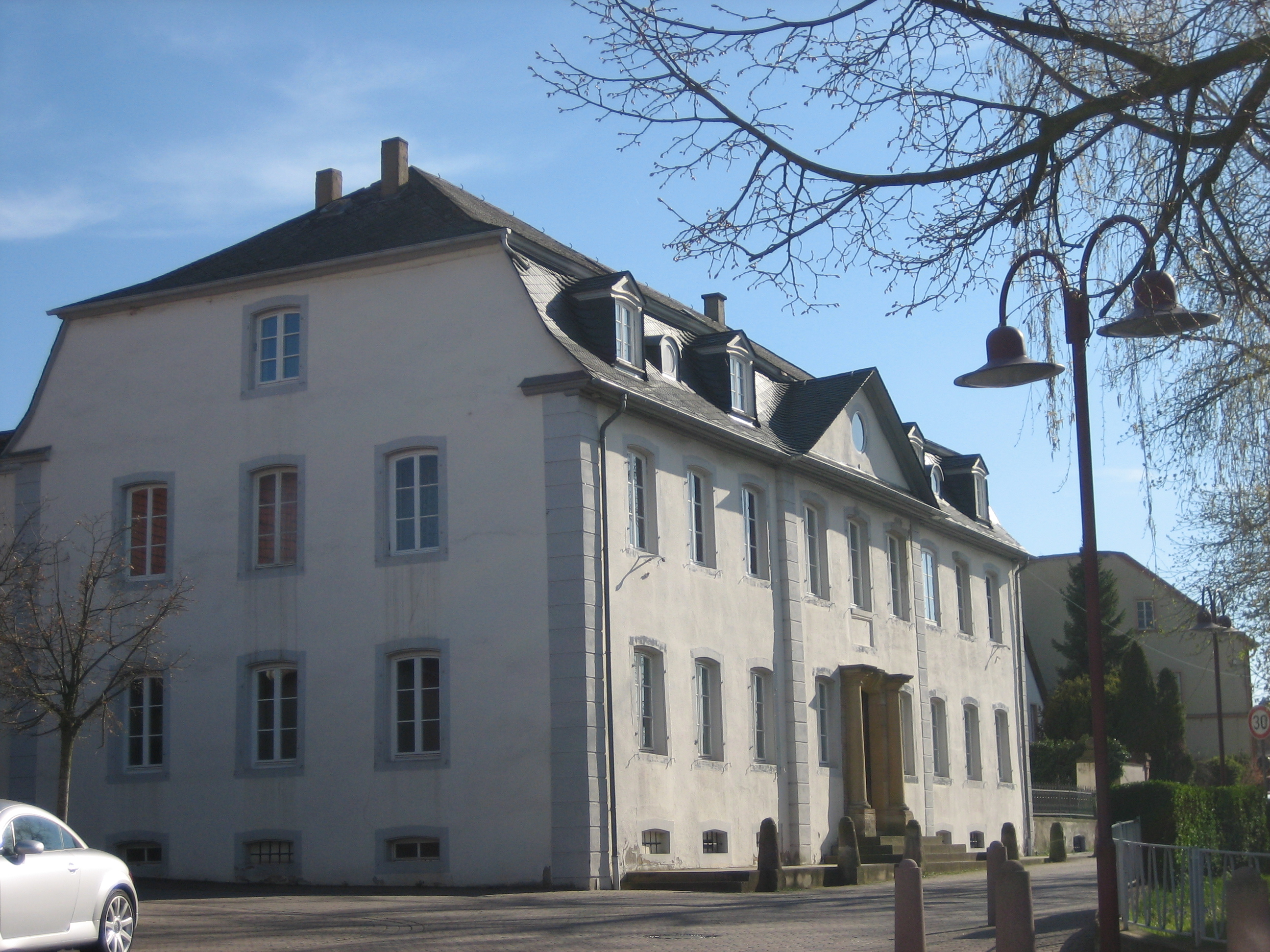
Salmsches Schloss

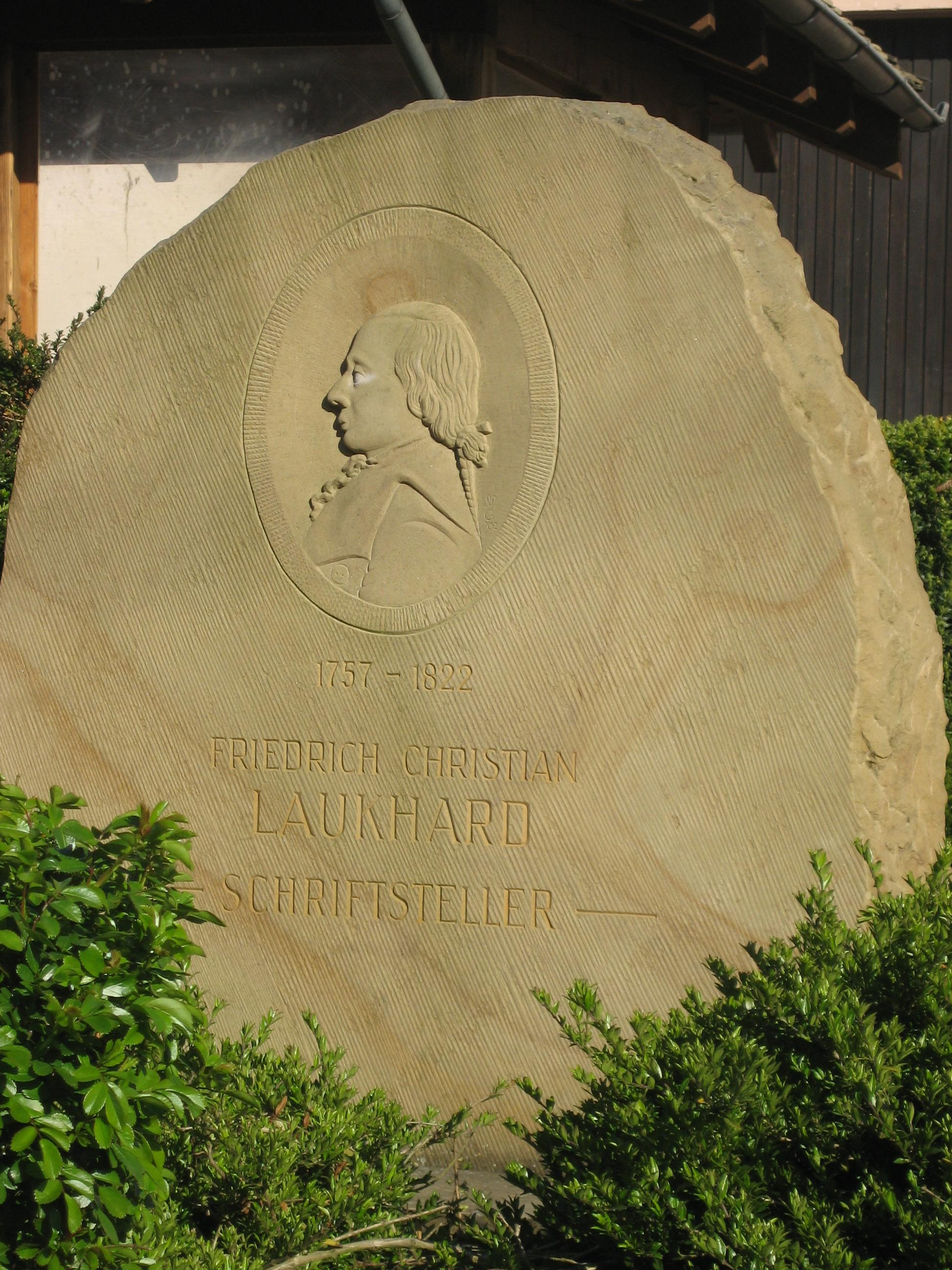
Laukhard Memorial

== Economy and infrastructure ==
The Mikroforum is, as a high-technology park, a major employer. Winegrowing plays an important rôle for the whole region.

=== Transport ===
There is a former railway station on the Wiesbachtalbahn in the municipality. There is also a bus service that operates several times a day from Alzey.
