= Gumbsheim =

- Municipality
- Coat of arms

- Location of Gumbsheim within Alzey-Worms district
- Interactive map of Gumbsheim
- Location within Germany Location within Rhineland-Palatinate
- Coordinates: 49°49′N 07°59′E
- Country: Germany
- State: Rhineland-Palatinate
- District: Alzey-Worms
- Municipal assoc.: Wöllstein

Government
  - Mayor (2019–24): Rudolf Eich

Area
  - Total: 3.34 km^{2} (1.29 sq mi)
- Elevation: 139 m (456 ft)

Population (2025-12-31)
  - Total: 612
  - Density: 183/km^{2} (475/sq mi)
- Time zone: UTC+01:00 (CET)
  - Summer (DST): UTC+02:00 (CEST)
- Postal codes: 55597
- Dialling codes: 06703
- Vehicle registration: AZ
- Website: www.gumbsheim.de

Gumbsheim is an Ortsgemeinde – a municipality belonging to a Verbandsgemeinde, a kind of collective municipality – in the Alzey-Worms district in Rhineland-Palatinate, Germany.

== Geography ==
=== Location ===
As a winegrowing centre, Gumbsheim lies in Germany's biggest winegrowing district and in the middle of the Rheinhessen wine region. It belongs to the Verbandsgemeinde of Wöllstein, whose seat is in the like-named municipality.

In Gumbsheim, the Dunzelbach empties into the Rohrbach.

=== Climate ===
Yearly precipitation in Gumbsheim amounts to 539 mm, which is very low, falling into the lowest tenth of the precipitation chart for all Germany. Only at 9% of the German Weather Service's weather stations are even lower figures recorded. The driest month is January. The most rainfall comes in June. In that month, precipitation is twice what it is in January. Precipitation varies moderately. At 39% of the weather stations, lower seasonal swings are recorded.

== History ==
In 738, Gumbsheim had its first documentary mention as Gimminsheim in a document from Lorsch Abbey.

=== Religion ===
There is an Evangelical church.

== Politics ==
=== Municipal council ===
The council is made up of 12 council members, who were elected by majority vote at the municipal election held on 7 June 2009, and the honorary mayor as chairman.

=== Coat of arms ===
The municipality's arms might be described thus: Per bend sinister, azure a lion's head sinister erased argent langued and crowned gules, and gules a wheel spoked of six of the second, over all on a bend sinister Or three bunches of grapes vert.

The German blazon accompanying the file used in this article (Von Blau und Rot durch einen goldenen Schräglinksbalken, belegt mit drei grünen Trauben, geteilt, oben ein silberner, rot gezungter und ebenso bekrönter nach links sehender Löwenkopf, unten ein silbernes sechsspeichiges Rad) makes no mention at all of the border around the escutcheon bearing the municipality's name.

== Culture and sightseeing ==
=== Clubs ===
- TTC Gumbsheim (table tennis)
- Männergesangsverein (men's singing club)
- Landfrauenverein (countrywomen's club)
- EFC SGE4EVER.de e.V. (Eintracht Frankfurt fan club with just under 200 members)
