= Wöllstein (Verbandsgemeinde) =

Municipality in Rhineland-Palatinate, Germany

- Verbandsgemeinde
- Location of Wöllstein within Alzey-Worms district
- Interactive map of Wöllstein
- Location within Germany Location within Rhineland-Palatinate
- Coordinates: 49°49′N 7°58′E
- Country: Germany
- State: Rhineland-Palatinate
- District: Alzey-Worms
- Seat: Wöllstein
- Subdivisions: 8 municipalities

Area
  - Total: 61.42 km^{2} (23.71 sq mi)

Population (2025-12-31)
  - Total: 11,973
  - Density: 194.9/km^{2} (504.9/sq mi)
- Time zone: UTC+01:00 (CET)
  - Summer (DST): UTC+02:00 (CEST)
- Website: www.woellstein.de

Wöllstein is a Verbandsgemeinde ("collective municipality") in the district Alzey-Worms, Rhineland-Palatinate, Germany. The seat of the Verbandsgemeinde is in Wöllstein.

The Verbandsgemeinde Wöllstein consists of the following Ortsgemeinden ("local municipalities"):

1. Eckelsheim
2. Gau-Bickelheim
3. Gumbsheim
4. Siefersheim
5. Stein-Bockenheim
6. Wendelsheim
7. Wöllstein
8. Wonsheim
