= Stein-Bockenheim =

- Municipality
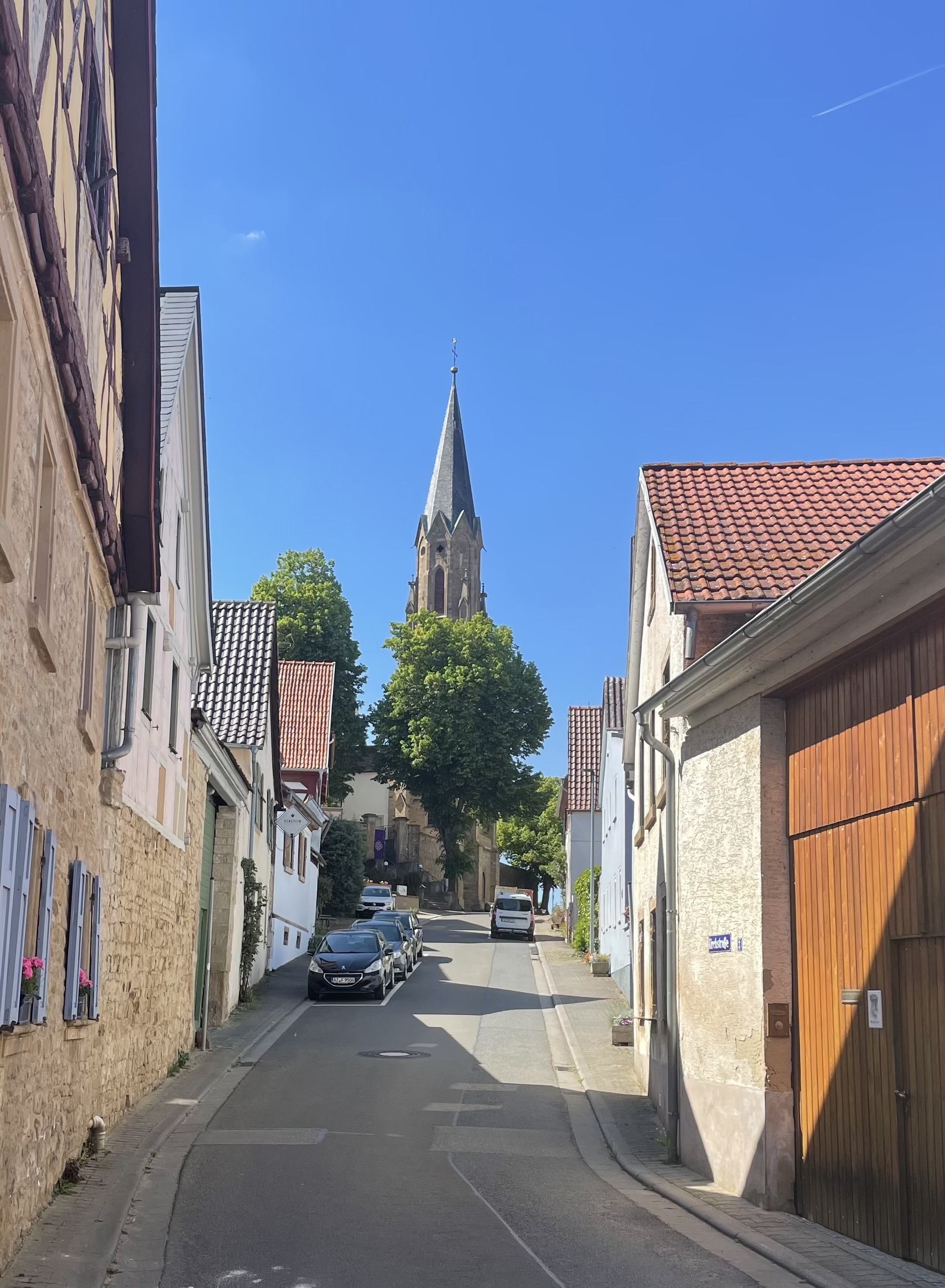
- village center and protestant church

- Coat of arms

- Location of Stein-Bockenheim within Alzey-Worms district
- Interactive map of Stein-Bockenheim
- Location within Germany Location within Rhineland-Palatinate
- Coordinates: 49°46′N 07°58′E
- Country: Germany
- State: Rhineland-Palatinate
- District: Alzey-Worms
- Municipal assoc.: Wöllstein

Government
  - Mayor (2019–24): Thorsten Jahn

Area
  - Total: 5.55 km^{2} (2.14 sq mi)
- Elevation: 198 m (650 ft)

Population (2025-12-31)
  - Total: 647
  - Density: 117/km^{2} (302/sq mi)
- Time zone: UTC+01:00 (CET)
  - Summer (DST): UTC+02:00 (CEST)
- Postal codes: 55599
- Dialling codes: 06703
- Vehicle registration: AZ
- Website: www.steinbockenheim.de

Stein-Bockenheim (German pronunciation: [ˈʃtaɪn ˈbɔkn̩haɪm]) is an Ortsgemeinde – a municipality belonging to a Verbandsgemeinde, a kind of collective municipality – in the Alzey-Worms district in Rhineland-Palatinate, Germany.

== Geography ==
=== Location ===
As a winegrowing centre, Stein-Bockenheim lies in Germany's biggest winegrowing district, in the middle of the Rhenish-Hessian Switzerland (Rheinhessische Schweiz) in the wine region of Rhenish Hesse. The Steitz winery is widely known for its wines and also runs an inn for holidaymakers on the winery estate. Vineyards cover 160 ha of the municipal area while 390 ha is made up of meadows and fields. Stein-Bockenheim belongs to the Verbandsgemeinde of Wöllstein, whose seat is in the like-named municipality. Rising above the village is the 36 m-tall tower at the Evangelical church.

South of Stein-Bockenheim rises the Dunzelbach.

== History ==
In 784, Stein-Bockenheim had its first documentary mention as Buckenheim.

== Politics ==
=== Municipal council ===
The council is made up of 12 council members, who were elected by majority vote at the municipal election held on 7 June 2009, and the honorary mayor as chairman.

=== Coat of arms ===
The municipality's arms might be described thus: Argent a Steinbock rearing sable langued gules and unguled and attired Or.

The municipality's armorial charge is the Steinbock, the Alpine Ibex. The charge, however, has no historical roots, and is likely a canting charge for the first syllable in the municipality's name, although this was added to the name only quite late in history, and may refer to the former landlords, the Rhinegraves zum Stein (“at the Stone”). The charge's name does also correspond to the second syllable in the municipality's name.

== Culture and sightseeing ==
=== Regular events ===
The yearly kermis (church consecration festival, locally known as the Kerb) is always held on the third weekend in September.
