= Gau-Bickelheim =

- Municipality
- Coat of arms

- Location of Gau-Bickelheim within Alzey-Worms district
- Interactive map of Gau-Bickelheim
- Location within Germany Location within Rhineland-Palatinate
- Coordinates: 49°50′08″N 08°01′04″E
- Country: Germany
- State: Rhineland-Palatinate
- District: Alzey-Worms
- Municipal assoc.: Wöllstein

Government
  - Mayor (2019–24): Jürgen Vollmer

Area
  - Total: 7.99 km^{2} (3.08 sq mi)
- Elevation: 139 m (456 ft)

Population (2025-12-31)
  - Total: 2,146
  - Density: 269/km^{2} (696/sq mi)
- Time zone: UTC+01:00 (CET)
  - Summer (DST): UTC+02:00 (CEST)
- Postal codes: 55599
- Dialling codes: 06701
- Vehicle registration: AZ
- Website: www.gau-bickelheim.de

Gau-Bickelheim is an Ortsgemeinde – a municipality belonging to a Verbandsgemeinde, a kind of collective municipality – in the Alzey-Worms district in Rhineland-Palatinate, Germany.

== Geography ==
=== Location ===
Gau-Bickelheim lies south of the Wißberg (mountain) in the Rheinhessisches Hügelland (Rhenish-Hessian Uplands).

== Politics ==
=== Municipal council ===
The council is made up of 16 council members, who were elected at the municipal election held on 7 June 2009, and the honorary mayor as chairman.

The municipal election held on 7 June 2009 yielded the following results:

	CDU	WG Gau-Bickelh.	WG Erbenich	Gesamt
2009	7	6	3	16 seats

=== Mayor ===
Gau-Bickelheim's mayor is Jürgen Vollmer (WG Gau-Bickelheim).

=== Coat of arms ===
The municipality's arms might be described thus: Per fess abased argent three pickaxes palewise in fess, the middle one abased, gules, and gules a wheel spoked of six of the first.

The pickaxes are a canting charge: “Pickaxe” is Pickel in German, which sounds rather like the second and third syllables of the municipality's name, Gau-Bickelheim. The escutcheon's base contains the Wheel of Mainz, an historical symbol of Electoral Mainz.

=== Town partnerships ===
- Aiserey, Côte-d'Or, France

== Culture and sightseeing ==
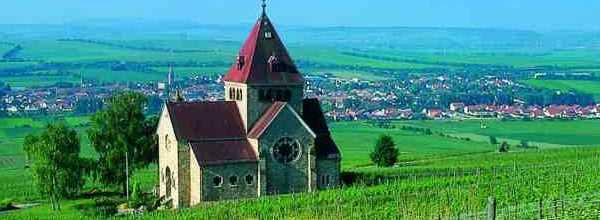
The Kreuzkapelle on the Wißberg near Gau-Bickelheim

=== Buildings ===
- Pfarrkirche St. Martin (“Saint Martin’s Parish Church”)
- Kreuzkapelle (“Cross Chapel”)

== Economy and infrastructure ==
=== Transport ===
Running through the municipality is Bundesstraße 420. Running nearby from northwest to southeast is the Autobahn A 61. The Gau-Bickelheim interchange (Nr. 52) is not right on Bundesstraße 420, but rather, it can be reached over Bundesstraße 50. The interchange itself is rather a sprawling one and looks somewhat like a half cloverleaf. This came about because the original plan called for there to be an interchange between the A 60 and the A 61 here. In the mid 1990s, an off-highway service centre was built nearby.

Gau-Bickelheim has at its disposal a railway station on the Rheinhessenbahn.

=== Public institutions ===
- Gau-Bickelheim highway police station

== Notable people ==
- The writer Arno Schmidt lived for a short while in Gau-Bickelheim after the Second World War as an Umsiedler (member of a mass migration). The municipality is mentioned in passing at the beginning of the narrative Schwarze Spiegel (“Black Mirrors”). The narrative Die Umsiedler gives this time a literary treatment.
