= Tiefenthal, Bad Kreuznach =

Tiefenthal
- Municipality
- Coat of arms

- Location of Tiefenthal within Bad Kreuznach district
- Interactive map of Tiefenthal
- Location within Germany Location within Rhineland-Palatinate
- Coordinates: 49°45′34″N 7°54′23″E
- Country: Germany
- State: Rhineland-Palatinate
- District: Bad Kreuznach
- Municipal assoc.: Bad Kreuznach

Government
  - Mayor (2019–24): Ulf Pees

Area
  - Total: 1.35 km^{2} (0.52 sq mi)
- Elevation: 180 m (590 ft)

Population (2025-12-31)
  - Total: 135
  - Density: 100/km^{2} (259/sq mi)
- Time zone: UTC+01:00 (CET)
  - Summer (DST): UTC+02:00 (CEST)
- Postal codes: 55546
- Dialling codes: 06709
- Vehicle registration: KH
- Website: www.tiefenthal.de

Tiefenthal (German pronunciation: [ˈtiːfn̩ˌtaːl]) is a municipality in the district of Bad Kreuznach in Rhineland-Palatinate, in western Germany.

== Coat of arms ==
The coat of arms of Tiefenthal includes a sword, a hammer, and a lion, each with symbolic significance beyond traditional heraldry. The lion is included because of a local folk tale wherein a pride of lions came out of the nearby forest one day in antiquity and terrorized the town for twelve days and twelve nights, only to disappear at dawn on the twelfth day. To this day, a superstitious fear of all feline animals persists.

The sword and hammer shown in the coat of arms relate to the same story. The town blacksmith is said to have created a sword and a hammer to drive the lions out of town, but neither was finished before the lions left of their own accord. These weapons are said to be buried with the blacksmith who died of grief over his wife, maimed in the lion attack because of his dedication to the creation of the two weapons.
