= Wonsheim =

- Municipality
- Coat of arms

- Location of Wonsheim within Alzey-Worms district
- Interactive map of Wonsheim
- Location within Germany Location within Rhineland-Palatinate
- Coordinates: 49°46′59″N 7°57′45″E
- Country: Germany
- State: Rhineland-Palatinate
- District: Alzey-Worms
- Municipal assoc.: Wöllstein

Government
  - Mayor (2019–24): Jochen Emrich

Area
  - Total: 8.79 km^{2} (3.39 sq mi)
- Elevation: 178 m (584 ft)

Population (2025-12-31)
  - Total: 971
  - Density: 110/km^{2} (286/sq mi)
- Time zone: UTC+01:00 (CET)
  - Summer (DST): UTC+02:00 (CEST)
- Postal codes: 55599
- Dialling codes: 06703
- Vehicle registration: AZ
- Website: www.wonsheim-rhh.de

Saint Lambert's church

Wonsheim is an Ortsgemeinde – a municipality belonging to a Verbandsgemeinde, a kind of collective municipality – in the Alzey-Worms district in Rhineland-Palatinate, Germany.

== Geography ==
=== Location ===
As a winegrowing centre, Wonsheim lies in Germany's biggest winegrowing district, in the middle of the wine region of Rhenish Hesse. It belongs to the Verbandsgemeinde of Wöllstein, whose seat is in the like-named municipality.

Through the municipality flows the river Dunselbach.

== History ==
On 10 June 800, Wonsheim had its first documentary mention in a donation document from Fulda Abbey as Vuanesheim.

== Politics ==
=== Municipal council ===
The council is made up of 12 council members, who were elected at the municipal election held on 7 June 2009, and the honorary mayor as chairman.

The municipal election held on 7 June 2009 yielded the following results:

	SPD	WG Haas	Total
2009	3	9	12 seats
2004	3	9	12 seats

=== Coat of arms ===
The municipality's arms might be described thus: Chapé, lozengy argent and azure, Or an orb banded and charged with a cross bottonnée gules both gemmed of the first and sable a lion rampant of the third armed, langued and crowned of the fourth.

== Culture and sightseeing ==
=== Buildings ===
- Saint Lambert's Evangelical Church (Lambertuskirche)
- Holy Cross Catholic Church (Heilig-Kreuz-Kirche)
- Town Hall

== Economy and infrastructure ==
=== Transport ===
Wonsheim lies near Autobahnen A 61 and A 63.
