= Wöllstein =

- Municipality
- Coat of arms

- Location of Wöllstein within Alzey-Worms district
- Interactive map of Wöllstein
- Location within Germany Location within Rhineland-Palatinate
- Coordinates: 49°48′52″N 7°57′39″E
- Country: Germany
- State: Rhineland-Palatinate
- District: Alzey-Worms
- Municipal assoc.: Wöllstein

Government
  - Mayor (2019–24): Johannes Brüchert (SPD)

Area
  - Total: 12 km^{2} (4.6 sq mi)
- Elevation: 134 m (440 ft)

Population (2025-12-31)
  - Total: 4,475
  - Density: 370/km^{2} (970/sq mi)
- Time zone: UTC+01:00 (CET)
  - Summer (DST): UTC+02:00 (CEST)
- Postal codes: 55597
- Dialling codes: 06703
- Vehicle registration: AZ
- Website: www.woellstein.de

Wöllstein (German pronunciation: [ˈvœlʃtaɪn]) is an Ortsgemeinde – a municipality belonging to a Verbandsgemeinde, a kind of collective municipality – in the Alzey-Worms district in Rhineland-Palatinate, Germany.

== Geography ==
=== Location ===
The municipality lies in Rhenish Hesse roughly 8 km southeast of Bad Kreuznach, and 30 km southwest of Mainz. It is the seat of the like-named Verbandsgemeinde.

== History ==
=== Postal station on the Dutch Post Route ===
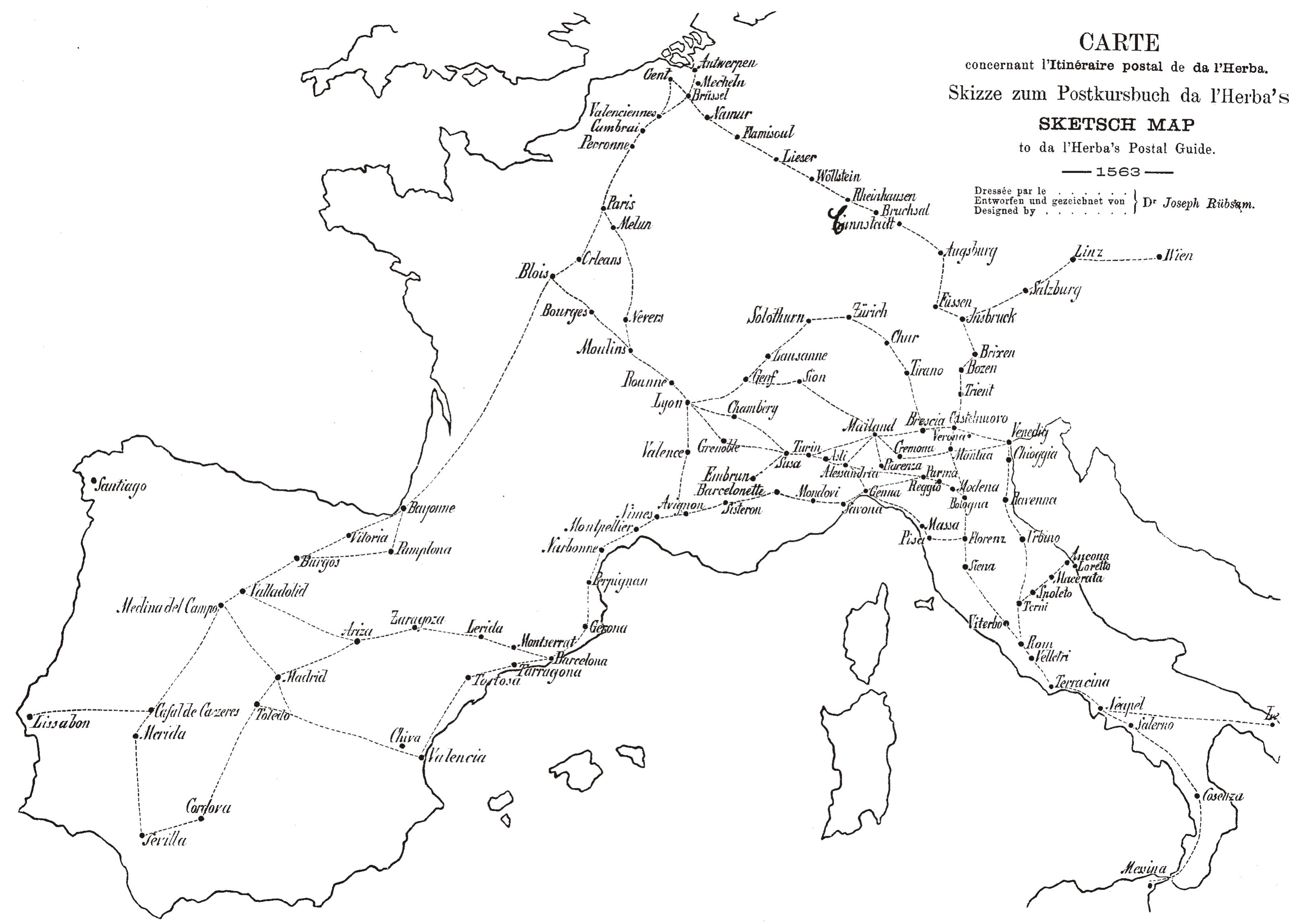
European postal routes in 1563 after da l’Herba with Wöllstein explicitly named

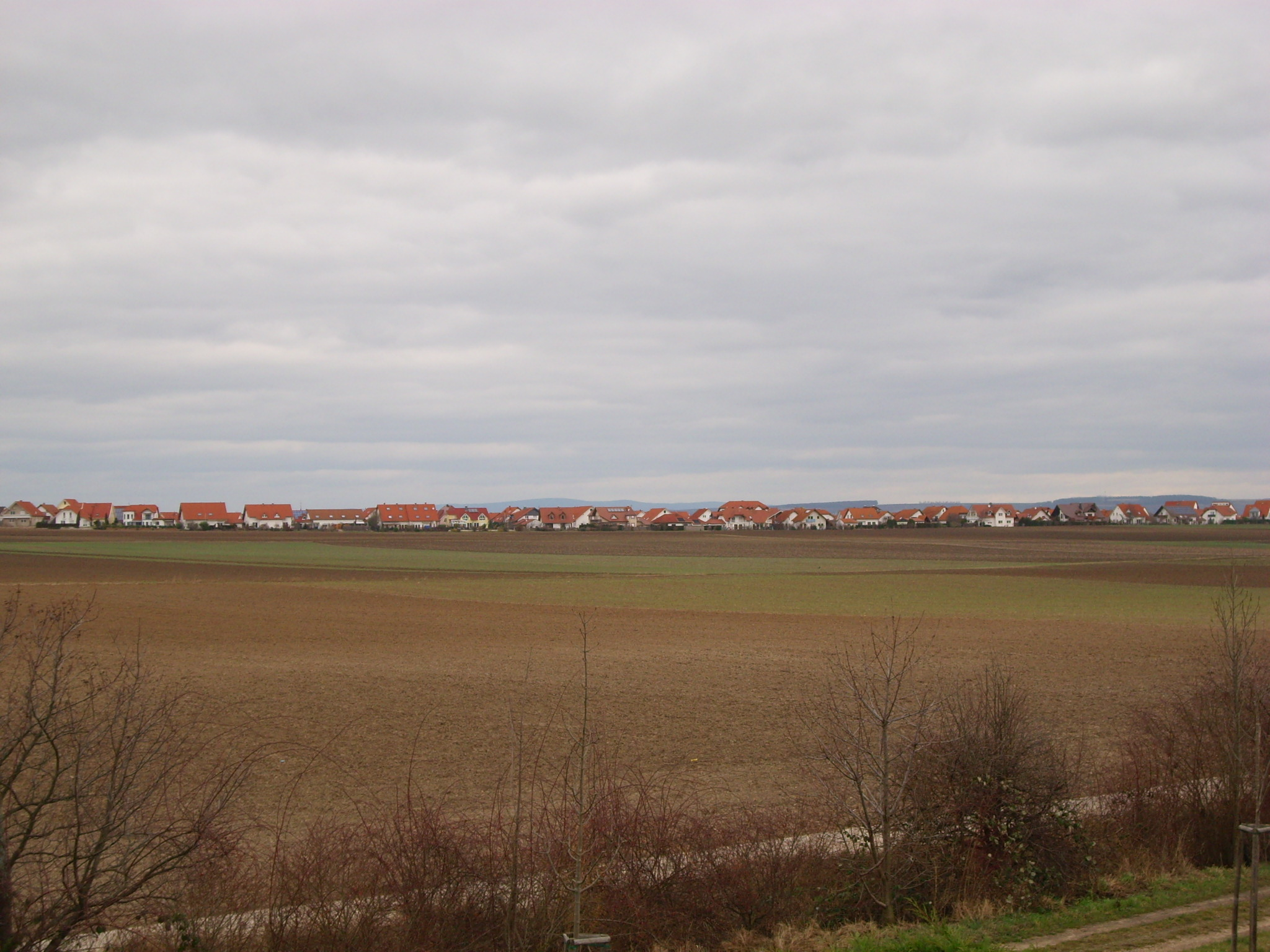
View of part of Wöllstein from Siefersheim

From the latter half of the 16th century, there was a postal station in Wöllstein on the Dutch Post Route running from Brussels (nowadays in Belgium rather than the Netherlands) by way of Rheinhausen and Augsburg to Innsbruck, Trent and Italy. The postal station had its first documentary mention in Giovanni da l’Herba's 1563 postal travel book as Bilstain ò Vilstain, villa (that is, village). Beginning in 1578, a branch of the Dutch Post Route led from Wöllstein to Cologne. During the time when the postal system was insolvent in the late 16th century and owing to the resulting postal station operators’ strike, both postal station operator Valentin Dill (Till) and his widow, the Postfrau zu Welstein Margarethen, played a decisive rôle as strike leaders, in which they refused to carry any mailbags anywhere beyond Wöllstein. After consolidation and the founding of the Imperial Post (Kaiserliche Reichspost) in 1597, the Wöllstein postal station was still open for business, but beginning in the late 17th century, owing to route changes and cities’ growing influence, it slowly lost its importance.

== Politics ==
=== Municipal council ===
The council is made up of 20 council members, who were elected at the municipal election held on 7 June 2009, and the honorary mayor as chairwoman.

The municipal election held on 7 June 2009 yielded the following results:

	SPD	CDU	FDP	Grüne	Total
1999	9	9	1	1	20 seats
2004	10	8	1	1	20 seats
2009	9	8	2	1	20 seats

=== Coat of arms ===
The municipality's arms might be described thus: Per pale gules a wheel spoked of six argent and azure semé of crosses pattée of the second a lion rampant of the second armed, langued and crowned of the first.

The wheel on the dexter (armsbearer's right, viewer's left) side is the Wheel of Mainz, a reference to Wöllstein's former allegiance to Electoral Mainz, and the lion rampant on the sinister (armsbearer's left, viewer's right) side is taken from the arms once borne by the County of Nassau-Saarbrücken, forming another reference to a former territorial allegiance.

In the late 19th century, Otto Hupp showed in one of his Kaffee HAG publications a different coat of arms for Wöllstein showing an abbot with a halo and a small bear springing (similar to “rampant”, but with both hindfeet on the ground). Both charges were predominantly black. The design was taken from old village seals dating back to the 16th century. The abbot figure stood for Saint Maximin of Trier. This was likewise a reference to a former territorial allegiance, as Wöllstein was once held by the abbey named for this saint. The bear is Saint Maximin's attribute.

The current arms have been borne since 1918.

=== Schultheißen and mayors ===
==== Falkenstein domain ====
- 1625–16?? N. Seibel
- 16??–1662 N. Gutenberger
- 1663–1682 Peter Dreber
- 1682–1690 Nicel Heuß

==== Electoral Mainz domain ====
- 1689–1709 Andreas Gutenberger
- 1709–1722 Johannes Ritter
- 1722–1760 Johann Jacob Schmitt
- 1760–1762 Carl Anton Wagner
- 1762–1795 Johann Georg Wagner

==== Nassau domain ====
- 1650–1665 N. Maurer
- 1666–1691 Caspar Adam
- 1692–1729 Christian Kern
- 1729–1768 Balthar Wörth
- 1768–1772 Johannes Germani
- 1772–1797 Gerhard Wolf

==== Wöllstein as a whole ====
- 1797–1800 Nicel Klein
- 1800–1811 Johann Steinmetz
- 1811–1813 Franz Seiß
- 1813–1814 Johann Steinmetz
- 1814–1849 Jacob Jungk
- 1849–1852 Georg Glod
- 1853–1854 Philipp Jungk
- 1854–1860 Philipp Moller I.
- 1860–1877 Philipp Jungk
- 1877–1885 Johann Mattes
- 1886–1904 Johann Hofmann IV.
- 1904–1931 Julius Moller
- 1931–1945 Julius Neubrech (NSDAP)
- 1945–1969 Jacob Werle (CDU)
- 1969–1979 Johann Rathgeber (SPD)
- 1979–1989 Heinrich Frohnhöfer (CDU)
- 1989–1994 Hans Jürgen Piegacki (SPD)
- 1994–1999 Heinrich Frohnhöfer (CDU)
- 1999–2009 Hans Jürgen Piegacki (SPD)
- 2009–2019 Lucia Müller (CDU)
- since 2019 Johannes Brüchert (SPD)

=== Town partnerships ===
- Barsac, Gironde, France
- Great Barford, Bedfordshire, England, United Kingdom.

== Economy and infrastructure ==
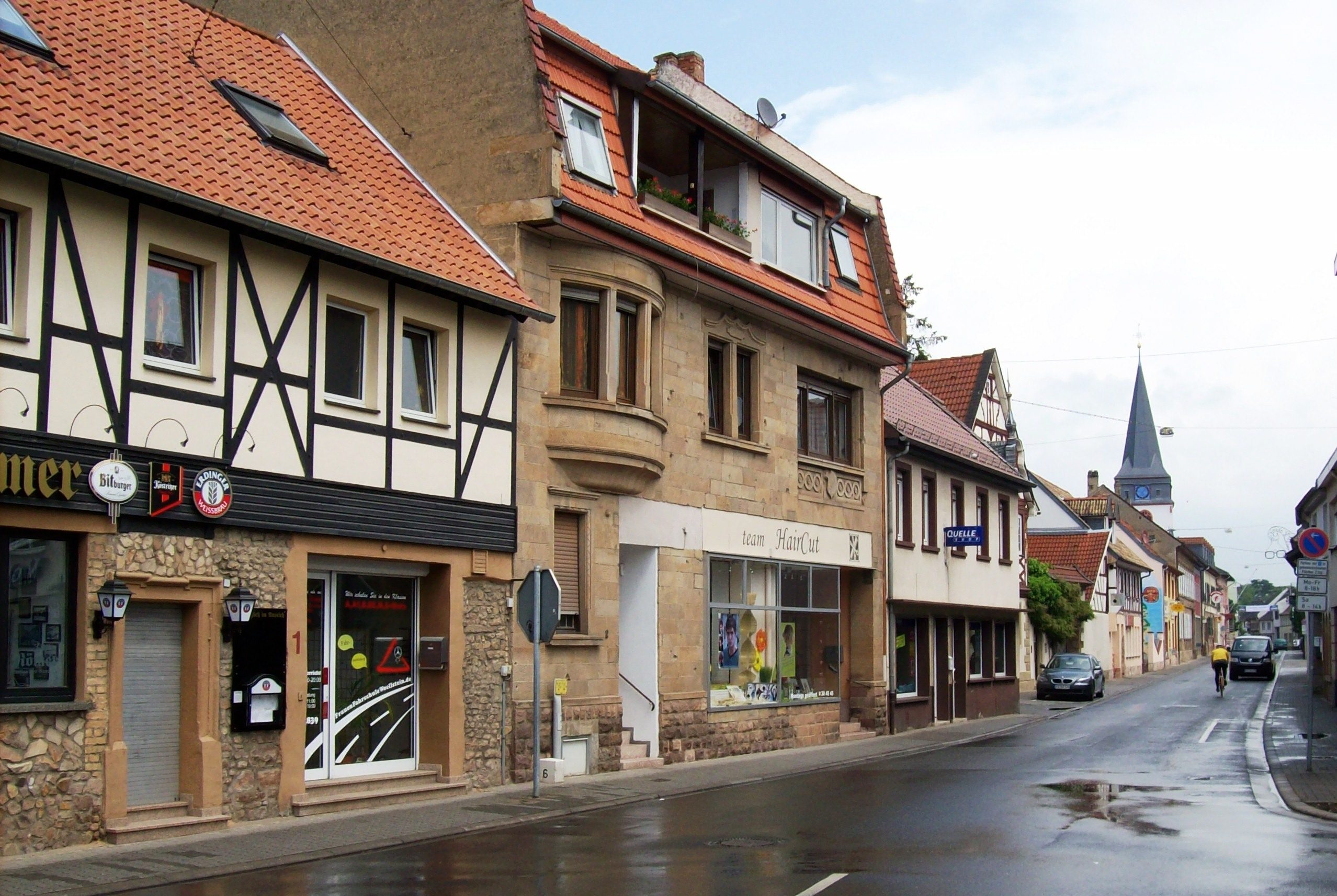
View from the Haus „Zum Römer“ (1598) of the village

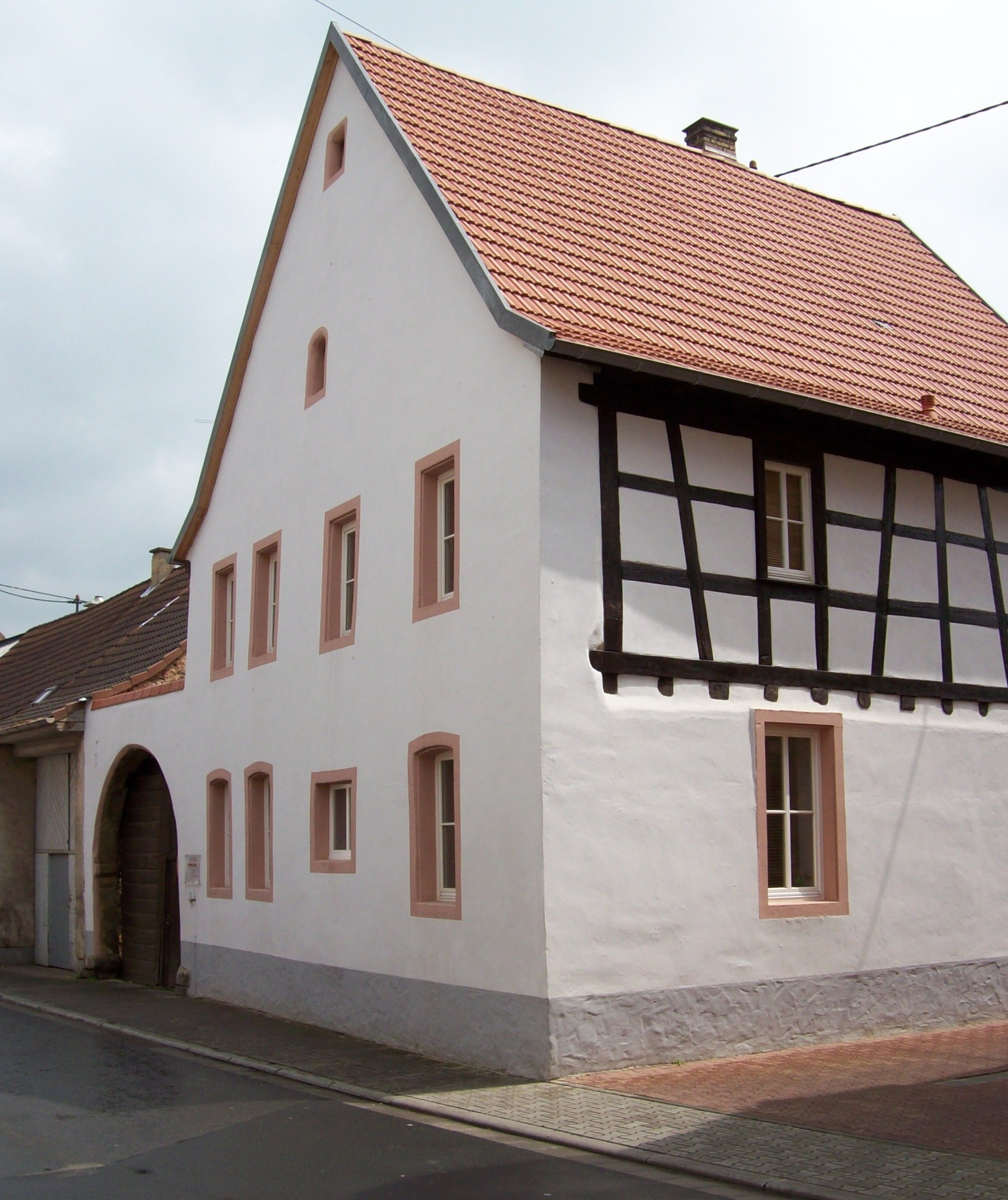
Historic house

=== Transport ===
Running through the Wöllstein municipal area is Bundesstraße 420, coming from Nierstein. To the east, the Justizvollzugsanstalt Rohrbach, a prison, stands at the highway. It also leads by an industrial-commercial area. Right nearby, in Gau-Bickelheim, is the Autobahn A 61.

=== Local public transport ===
There are links to bus routes run by Omnibusverkehr Rhein-Nahe (ORN) and the Verkehrsgesellschaft Bad Kreuznach.

Several times daily, buses run the route from Wöllstein by way of Siefersheim, Wonsheim and Wendelsheim to Alzey, and in the opposite direction there is the odd bus to Wörrstadt. The link to Bad Kreuznach is by comparison to the one to Alzey somewhat better. These buses run hourly on weekdays by way of Volxheim and Hackenheim to Bad Kreuznach.

=== Established businesses ===
Located in Wöllstein are the JUWÖ Poroton Werke (hollow bricks), Meralux (doors and windows), the institutional kitchen supplier Jomo and a Lidl distribution centre.

=== Public institutions ===
Since 2002, there has been the Justizvollzugsanstalt Rohrbach (prison) in Wöllstein. Moreover, there are a Realschule and a primary school. There are also two kindergartens at the municipality's disposal.

== Famous people ==
- Georg Heinrich Baron of Langsdorff, nature researcher, b. 18 April 1774 in Wöllstein, d. 9 June 1852 in Freiburg im Breisgau
- Helene Fischer, hit singer, b. 5 August 1984 in Krasnoyarsk, grew up in Wöllstein after she moved from Russia with her family.
