= Gauersheim =

- Municipality
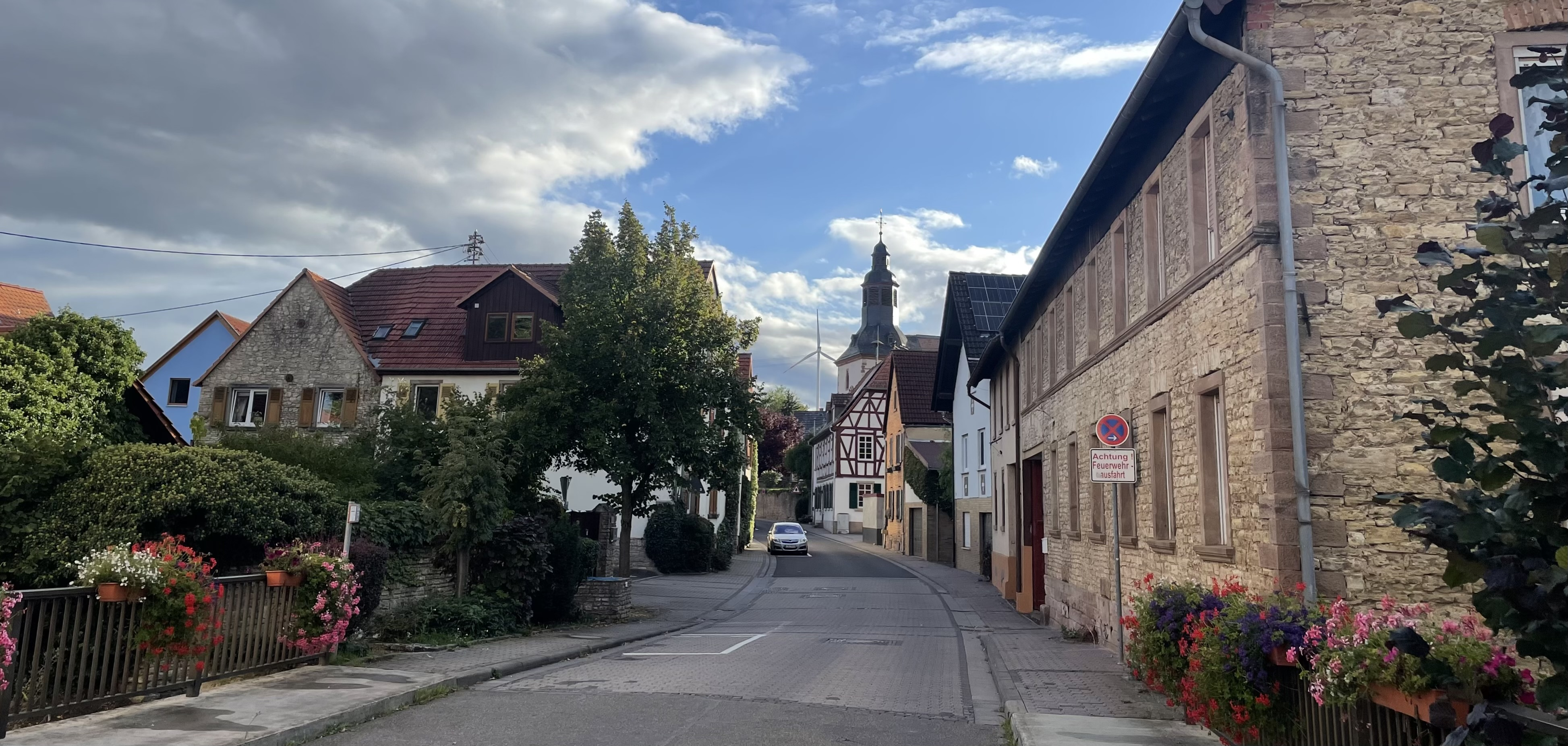
- Brückenstraße (Bridge Street) in the village center

- Coat of arms

- Location of Gauersheim within Donnersbergkreis district
- Interactive map of Gauersheim
- Location within Germany Location within Rhineland-Palatinate
- Coordinates: 49°39′35.5104″N 8°4′22.1772″E
- Country: Germany
- State: Rhineland-Palatinate
- District: Donnersbergkreis
- Municipal assoc.: Kirchheimbolanden

Government
  - Mayor (2019–24): Reiner Schlesser

Area
  - Total: 5.25 km^{2} (2.03 sq mi)
- Elevation: 205 m (673 ft)

Population (2025-12-31)
  - Total: 657
  - Density: 125/km^{2} (324/sq mi)
- Time zone: UTC+01:00 (CET)
  - Summer (DST): UTC+02:00 (CEST)
- Postal codes: 67294
- Dialling codes: 06355
- Vehicle registration: KIB
- Website: kirchheimbolanden.de

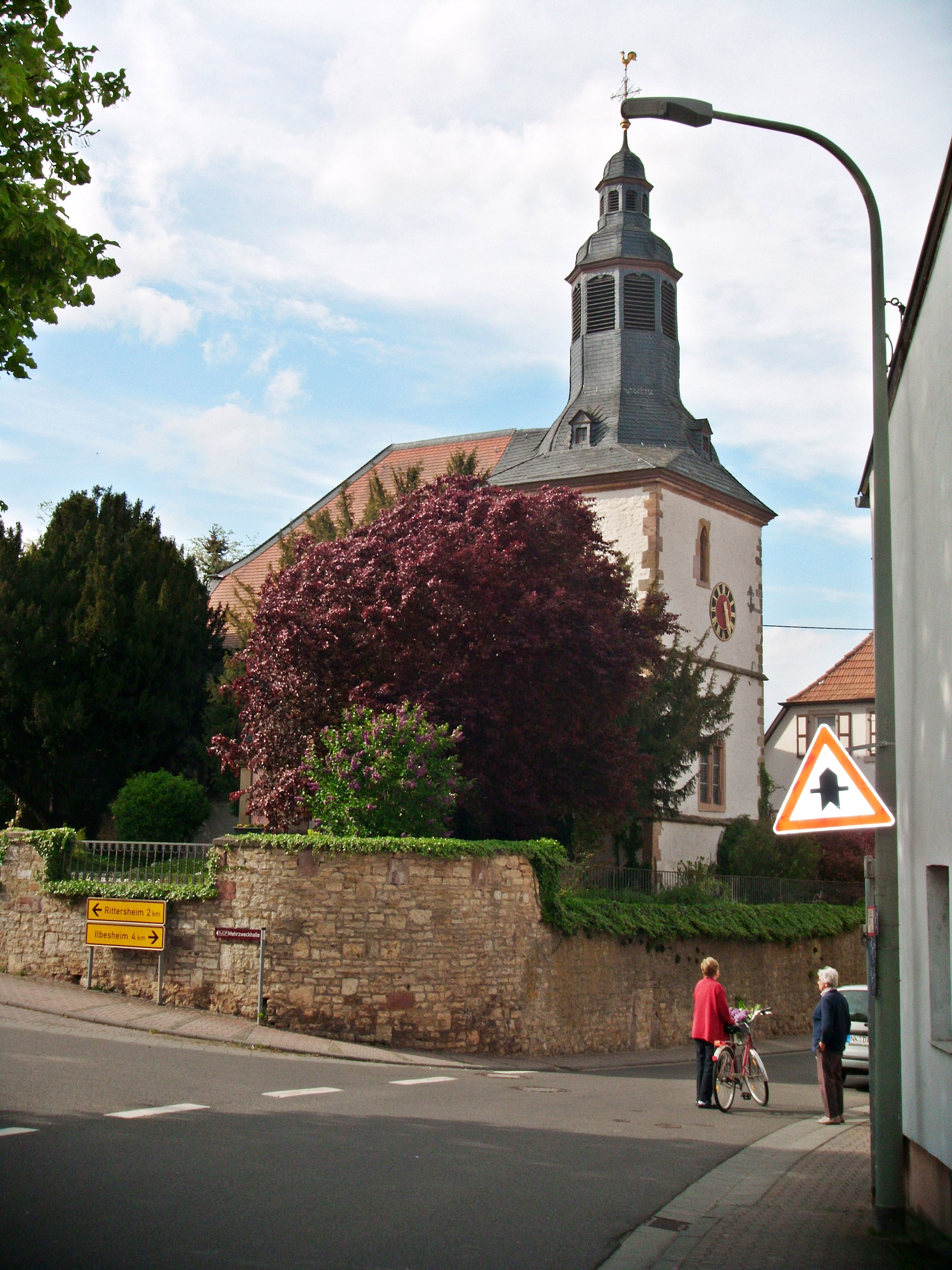
Protestant church

Gauersheim is a municipality in the Donnersbergkreis district, in Rhineland-Palatinate, Germany.

== Geography ==
The village is situated in the Alzey Hills part of the Rhenish-Hessian Hills, about 4 km (2.5 mi) east of Kirchheimbolanden. Neighbouring municipalities are Stetten, Albisheim, Marnheim, Bolanden, Kirchheimbolanden, Bischheim and Rittersheim.

The west of the district is occupied by the Hungerberg hill, an up to 302 m (990 ft) high plateau. The Leiselbach stream flows through the village.

== History ==
=== Etymology ===
The name „Gauersheim“ indicates a frankish establishment, which often end with the Suffix -heim (meaning ‚home‘ or ‚homestead‘). Preceding that is the frankish forename Gawirich, making Gauersheim the „home of Gawirich“.

=== History ===
==== Early history ====
Neolithic tools and Roman shards have been found in the area.

==== Early Middle Ages ====
Gauersheim first appeared in 835 as „Gouurichesheim“ in a document, which proves the donation of the village to Prüm Abbey by emperor Louis the Pious. Viticulture is documented since 893.

==== High/Late Middle Ages ====
Around 1200 the counts of Leiningen as fiefs of Prüm Abbey; the Rheingrafen as fiefs of the Elector of Mainz and the Bolanden family held rights and claims to Gauersheim. A local dynasty, the Knights of Gauersheim are mentioned in documents between 1222 and 1447. In the 14th century the Waldgraves ruled over the village. In the 15th century the knights Steben von Einselthum owned parts of Gauersheim, as well as the knights of Oberstein. After the death of childless Friedrich Steben von Einselthum in 1549, his cousin Hans IX. of Walbrunn inherited the Einselthums parts. In 1614 the barons of Walbrunn bought the rest of the village making them the sole rulers over Gauersheim.

==== Modern era ====
After the War of the First Coalition Gauersheim was occupied and later annexed by France with the Treaty of Campo Formio in 1797. From 1798 to 1814 it belonged to the French Departement du Mont-Tonnerre. After the Congress of Vienna the region was first given to Austria (1815) and later to Bavaria (1816). In 1815 the village had 488 inhabitants.

After World War II Gauersheim became part of Rhineland-Palatinate (1946). Since 1969 it belongs to the Donnersbergkreis district.

== Politics ==
=== Council ===
The village council is composed of 12 members who were elected in a personalized proportional representation in the local elections on June 9, 2024, and the honorary mayor as chairman.

=== Heraldry ===
The coat of arms depicts the Virgin Mary holding Jesus. Below her are two smaller shields depicting the blazons of the Knights of Oberstein (lion) and the Barons of Wallbrunn (lozenges).

== Religion ==
The protestant church in the village center is the parish church for Gauersheim, Ilbesheim, Rittersheim and Stetten. It was built in the 13th century and expanded in 1751.

== Culture and sights ==
=== Cultural heritage monuments ===
- protestant church
- parsonage
- war memorial
- former school (now community center)
- three houses on main street
- Jewish cemetery
- cross at L386 road
- etc.
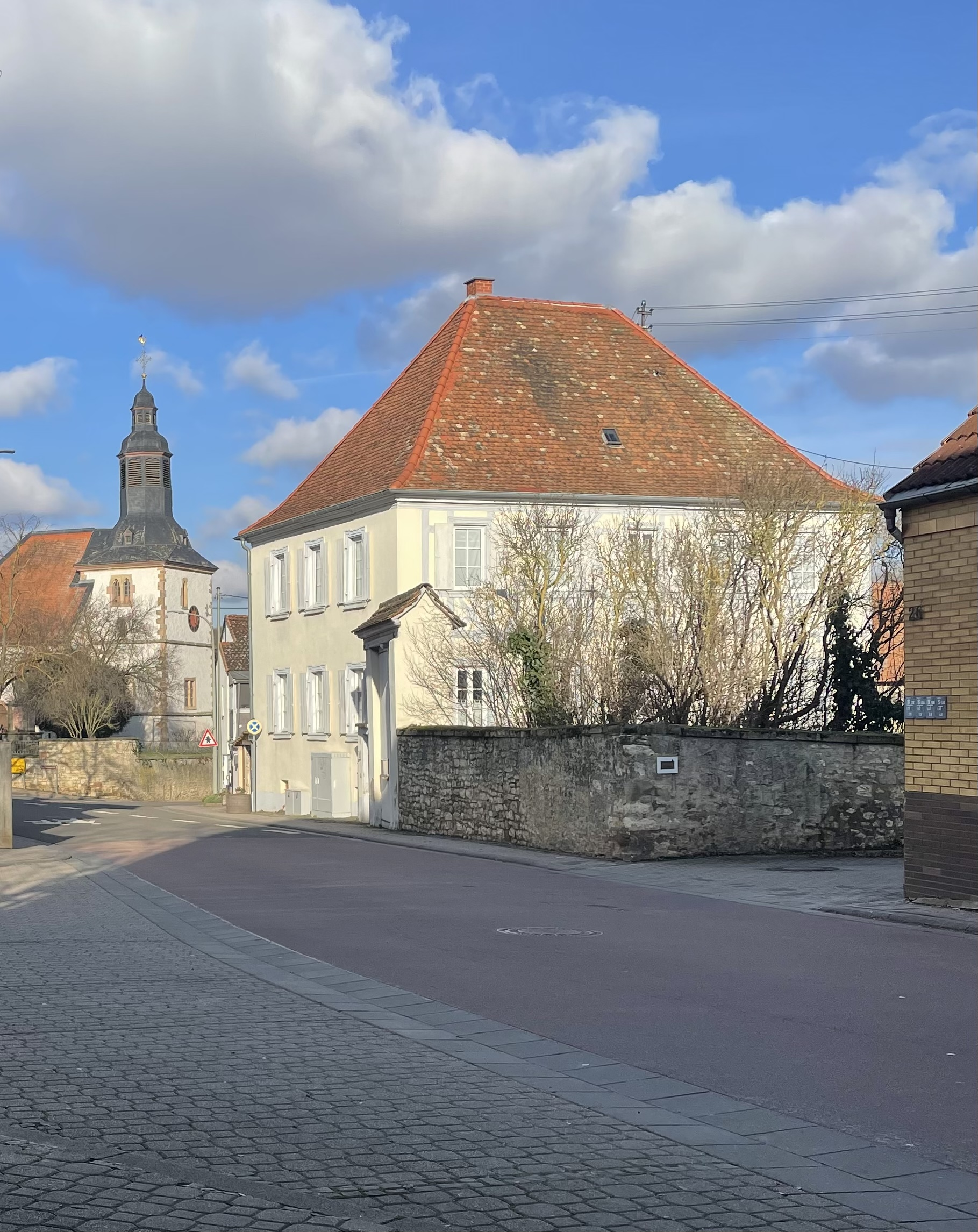
Parsonage

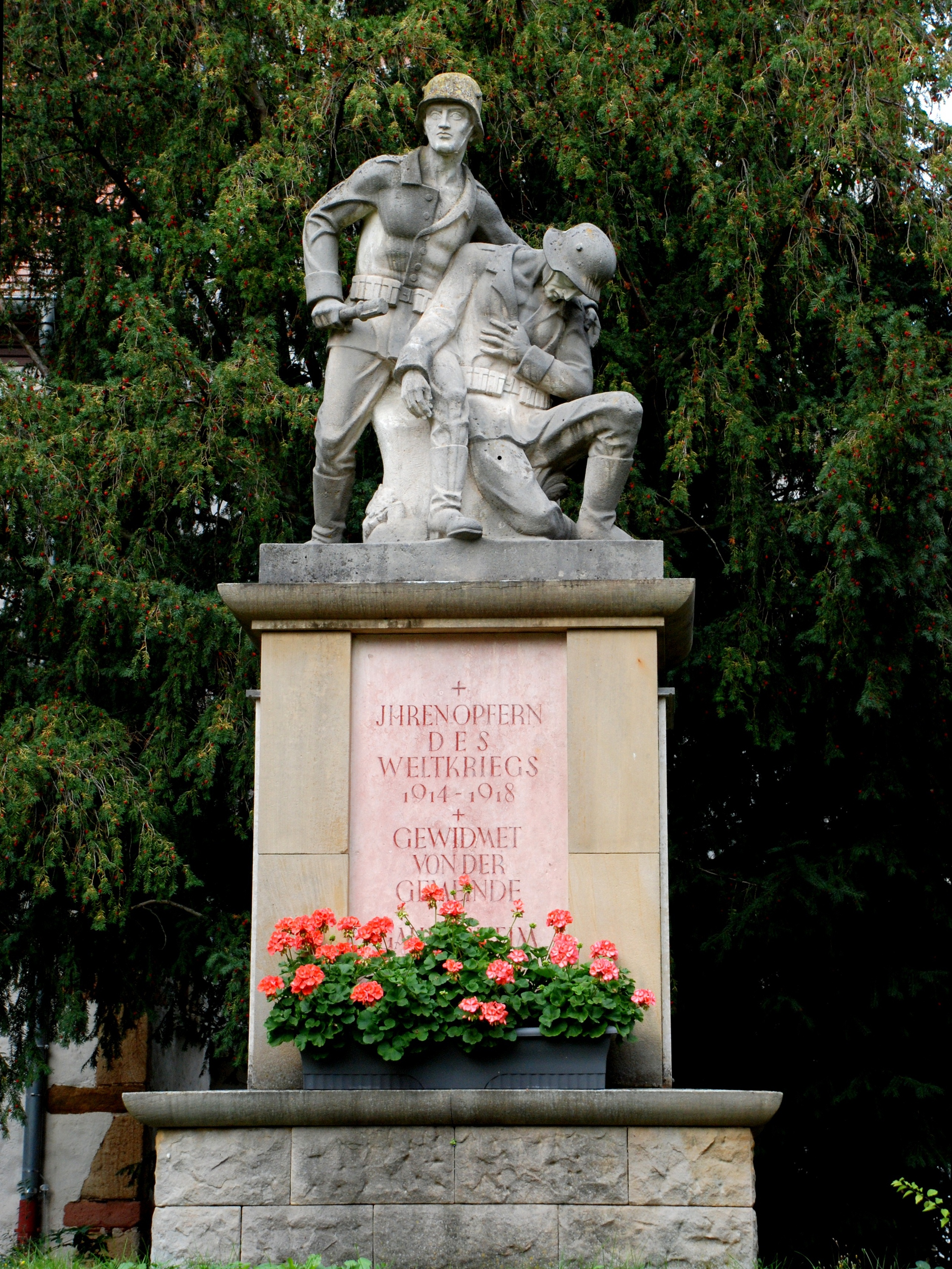
War memorial

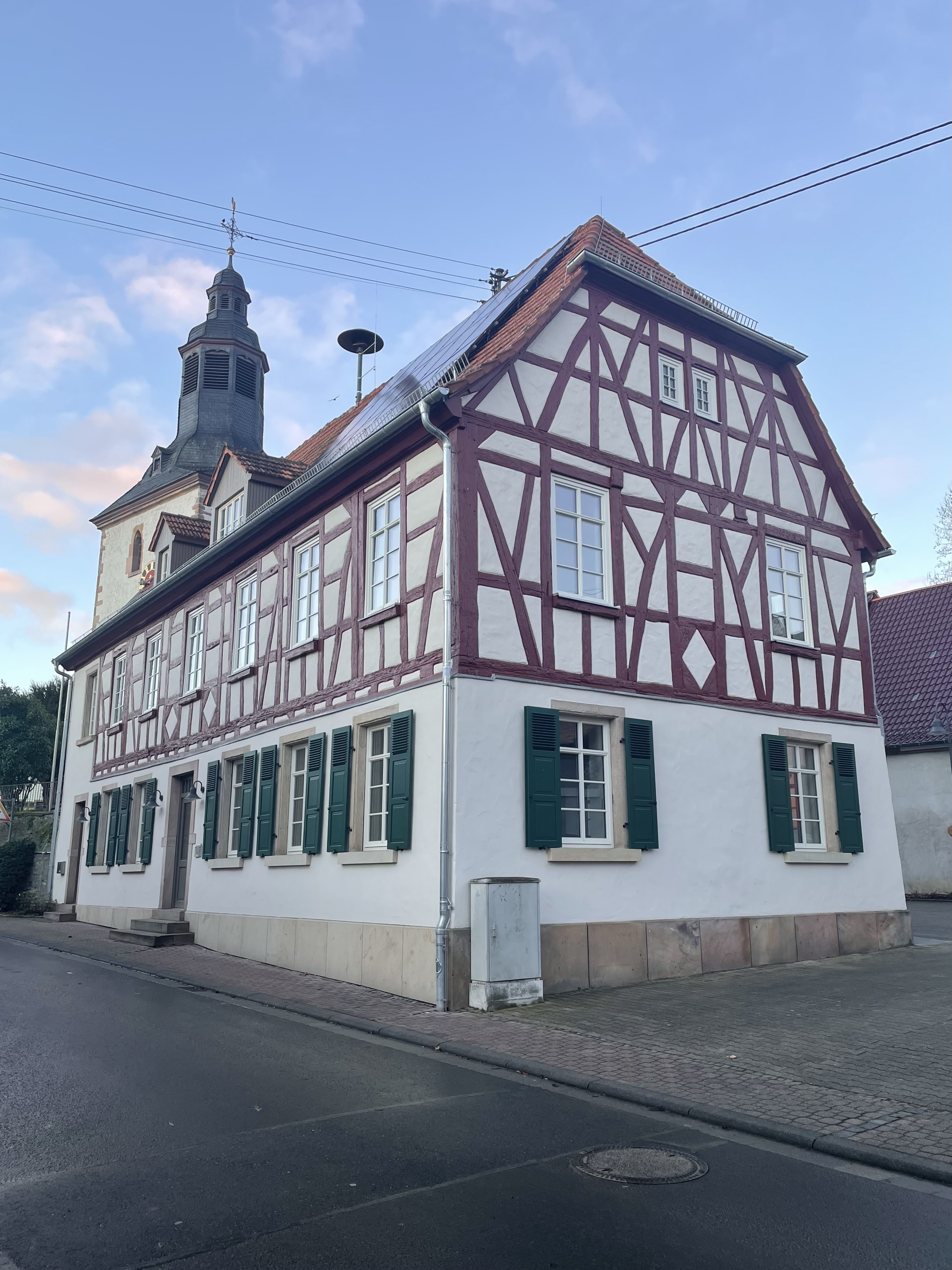
Former school

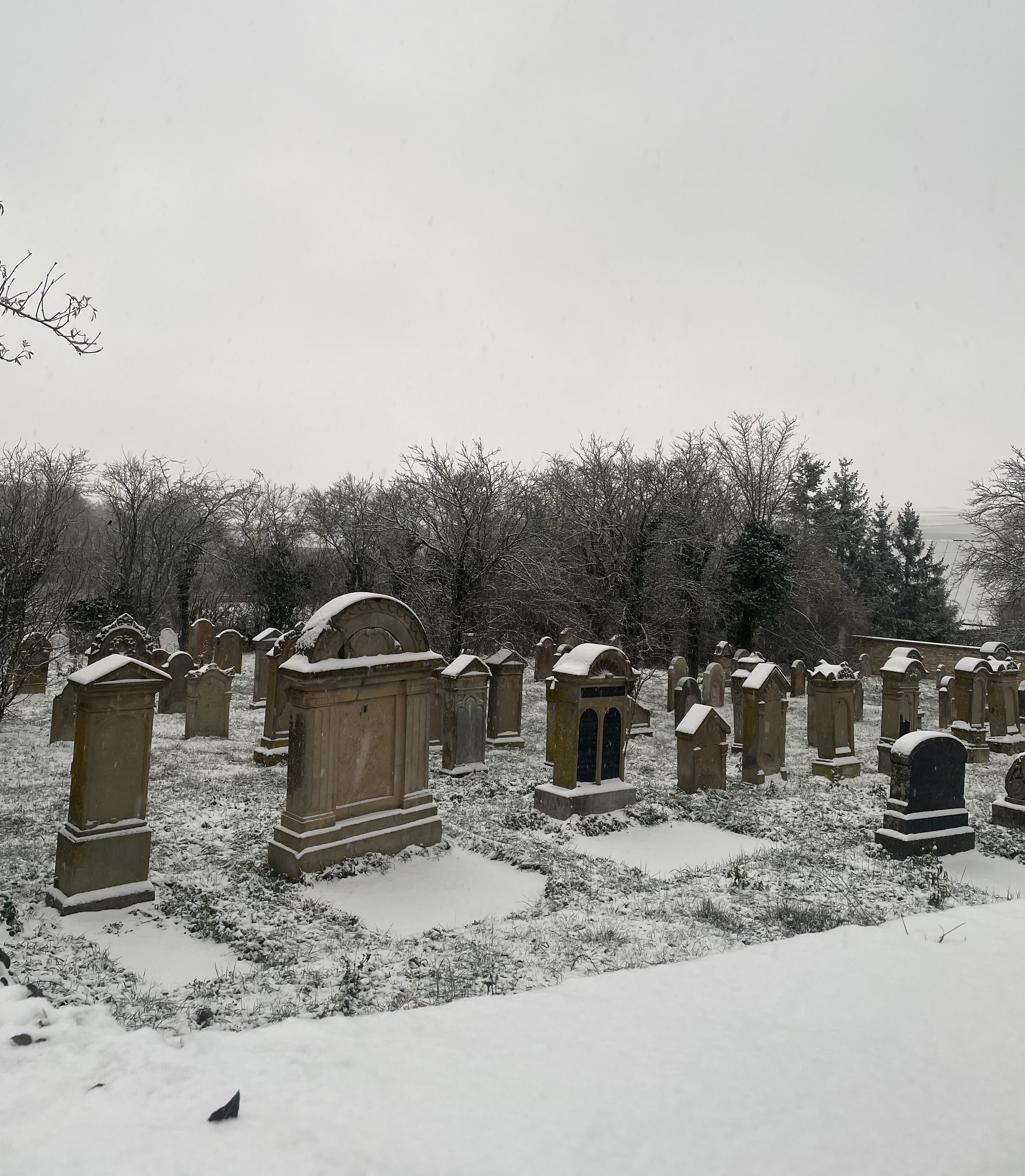
Jewish cemetery

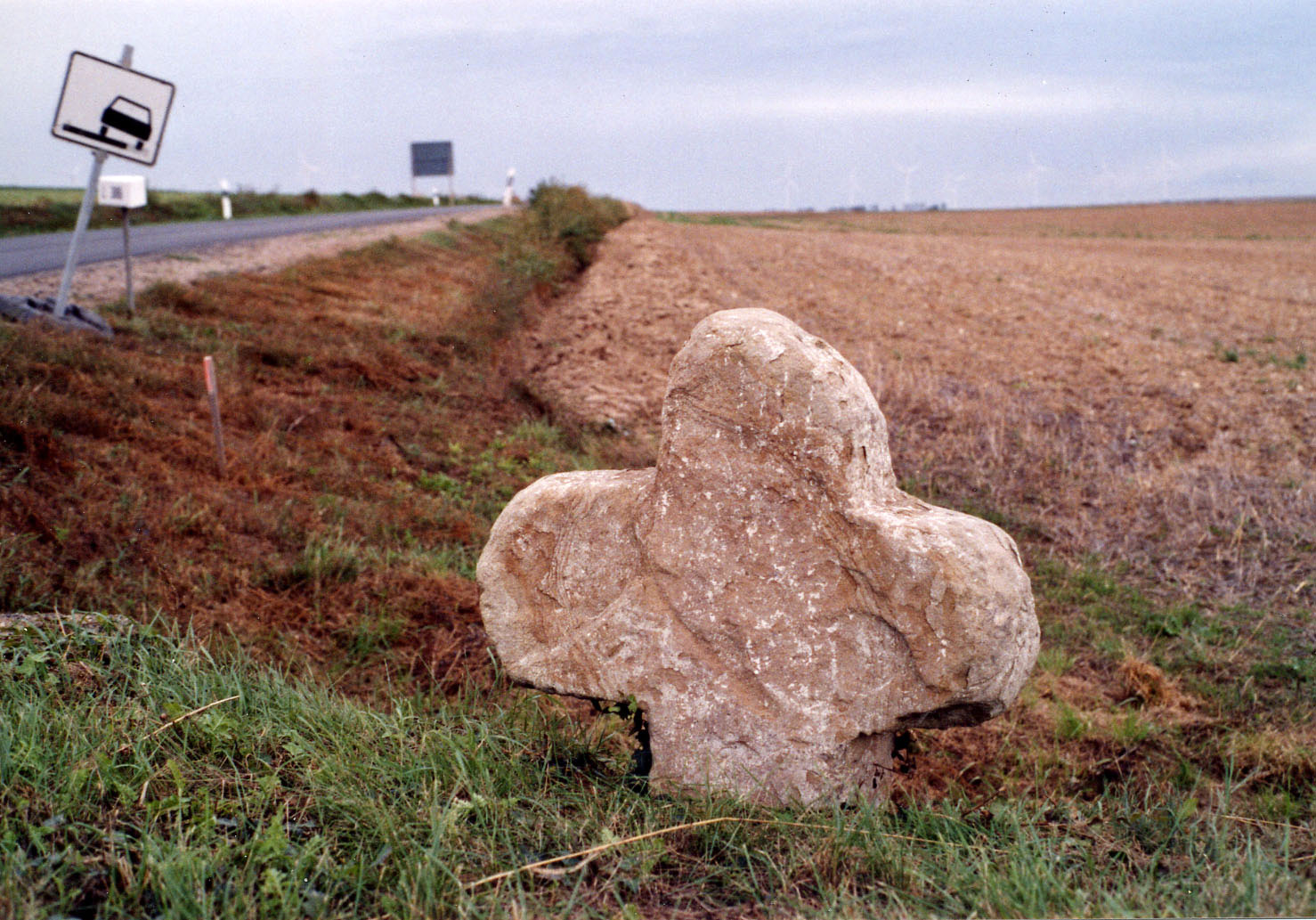
Cross at L386

=== Nature ===
A large plane tree next to the church is a protected natural monument.

=== Festivals ===
- Gaaschemer Kerb (4th weekend in September)
- Adventsbasar christmas market (last weekend in November)

== Economy and infrastructure ==
=== Economy ===
Gauersheim is part of the Palatinate wine region. There are 20 ha (50 ac) of vineyards in the municipality on the southern slope of the valley.

A wind farm was built between 2013 and 2015 which is partly inside Gauersheim‘s municipal borders.

=== Infrastructure ===
The A63 highway is about 4 km (2.5 mi) west of Gauersheim. The nearest train stations are situated in Albisheim and Kirchheimbolanden, from which only the latter is served by passenger trains regularly. Bus lines 904, 907 and 928 of the VRN serve the village.
