= Kriegsfeld =

- Municipality
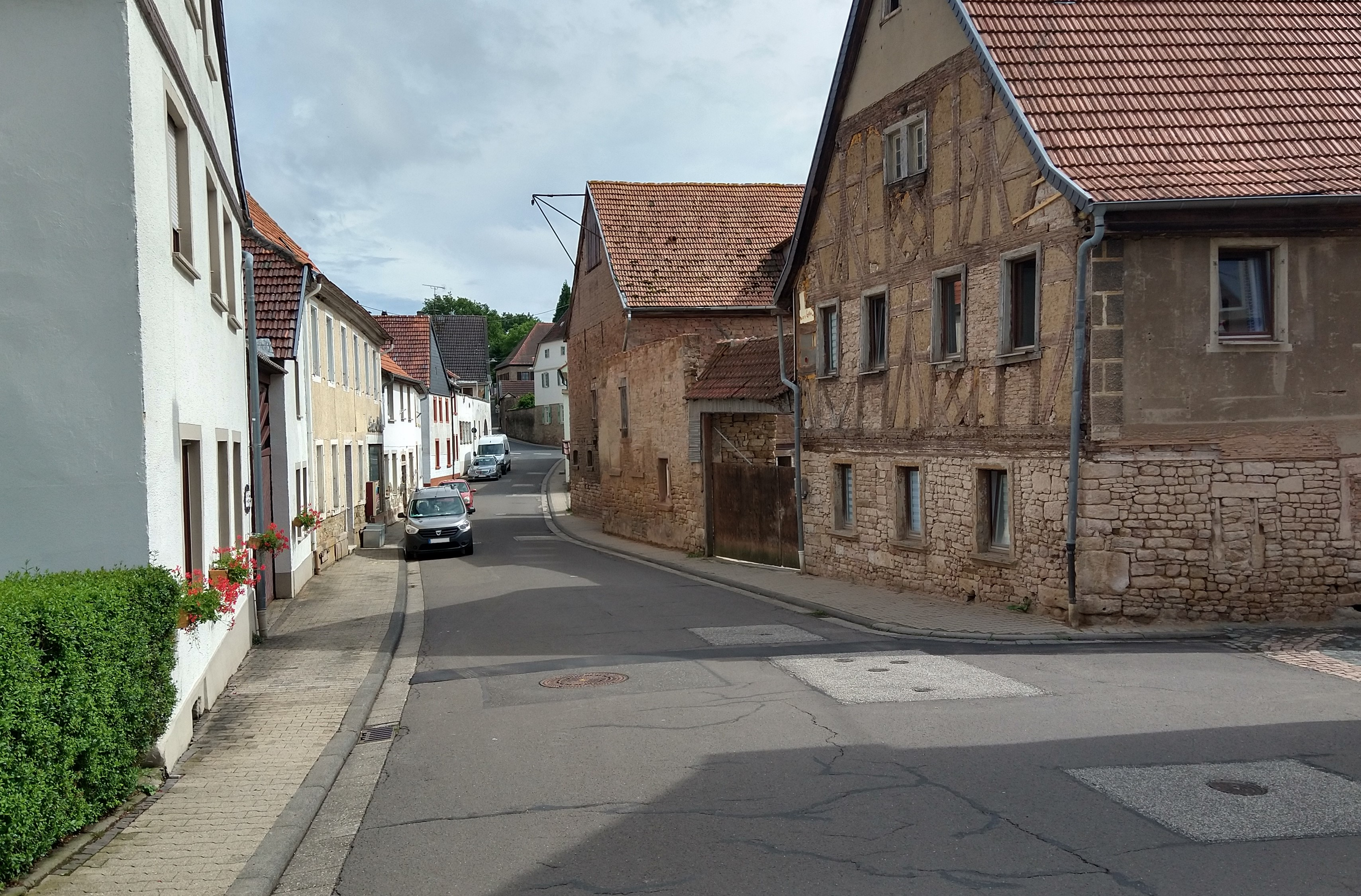
- Obergasse

- Coat of arms

- Location of Kriegsfeld within Donnersbergkreis district
- Interactive map of Kriegsfeld
- Location within Germany Location within Rhineland-Palatinate
- Coordinates: 49°42′34″N 7°54′55″E
- Country: Germany
- State: Rhineland-Palatinate
- District: Donnersbergkreis
- Municipal assoc.: Kirchheimbolanden

Government
  - Mayor (2019–24): Albert Ziegler

Area
  - Total: 26.41 km^{2} (10.20 sq mi)
- Elevation: 340 m (1,120 ft)

Population (2025-12-31)
  - Total: 972
  - Density: 36.8/km^{2} (95.3/sq mi)
- Time zone: UTC+01:00 (CET)
  - Summer (DST): UTC+02:00 (CEST)
- Postal codes: 67819
- Dialling codes: 06358
- Vehicle registration: KIB
- Website: www.kriegsfeld.de

Kriegsfeld is a municipality in the Donnersbergkreis district, in Rhineland-Palatinate, Germany.

== Geography ==
Kriegsfeld is located in Rhenish-Hessian Switzerland, a part of the North Palatine Uplands. The Kriegsbach flows through the village. It borders the municipalities of Mörsfeld, Wendelsheim, Nieder-Wiesen, Offenheim, Oberwiesen, Kirchheimbolanden, Ruppertsecken, Gerbach and Gaugrehweiler.

== History ==
Kriegsfeld was first mentioned as Chrichesfeld in the Codex Eberhardi of Fulda Abbey in October 900. In the early middle ages it belonged to the Duchy of Franconia. Kriegsfeld and neighbouring Mörsfeld are said to be two of the oldest settlements in the area. After the Franconian Gauverfassung was disbanded around 1100 several duchies, margraviates and other Independent territories formed.

Kriegsfeld, along with 24 other villages on both sides of the Alsenz river came under the rule of the Raugraves. For 200 years they were the sole rulers over Kriegsfeld. In the 13th century it was split in two. In 1376 the Counts of Bolanden and Rupert I owned half the village. The other half was given to Frederick I in 1457. In 1579 all of Kriegsfeld became part of the Electoral Palatinate and was administered from Alzey. It is not known where the boundary between the two parts of the village was situated.

After the War of the First Coalition Kriegsfeld was occupied and later annexed by France with the Treaty of Campo Formio in 1797. From 1798 to 1814 it belonged to the French Departement du Mont-Tonnerre. After the Congress of Vienna the region was first given to Austria (1815) and later to Bavaria (1816).

After World War II Kriegsfeld became part of Rhineland-Palatinate (1946). Since 1969 it belongs to the Donnersbergkreis district. In 2000 Kriegsfeld celebrated its 1100-year jubilee.

== Politics ==
=== Council ===
The village council is composed of 16 members who were elected in a personalized proportional representation in the local elections on June 9, 2024, and the honorary mayor as chairman.

=== Heraldry ===
The coat of arms shows a knight holding a wreath in his right hand. It is based on a seal from 1622. The knight (or warrior) can be seen as a folk etymological interpretation of the villages name (Krieg = war). The tincture is influenced by heraldrist Otto Hupp and arbitrary. An alternative interpretation of the old seal is, that it shows a miner in a miner's apron holding a lamp. Extensive quicksilver mining took place in Kriesfeld in the 17th and 18th century, making it a mining community at the time. It was granted by the Bavarian Ministry of the Interior on the 15th March 1926.

== Religion ==
There are a catholic and a protestant church in Kriegsfeld.

The local parish was given to the reformed church in the early 18th century. Only in 1759, the catholics got their own parish again. A church was built in 1787 but became to small, which led to the construction of a new one in the 1930s. Since 2016 the catholics are part of Kirchheimbolanden parish.

The local jews were buried in Münsterappel.

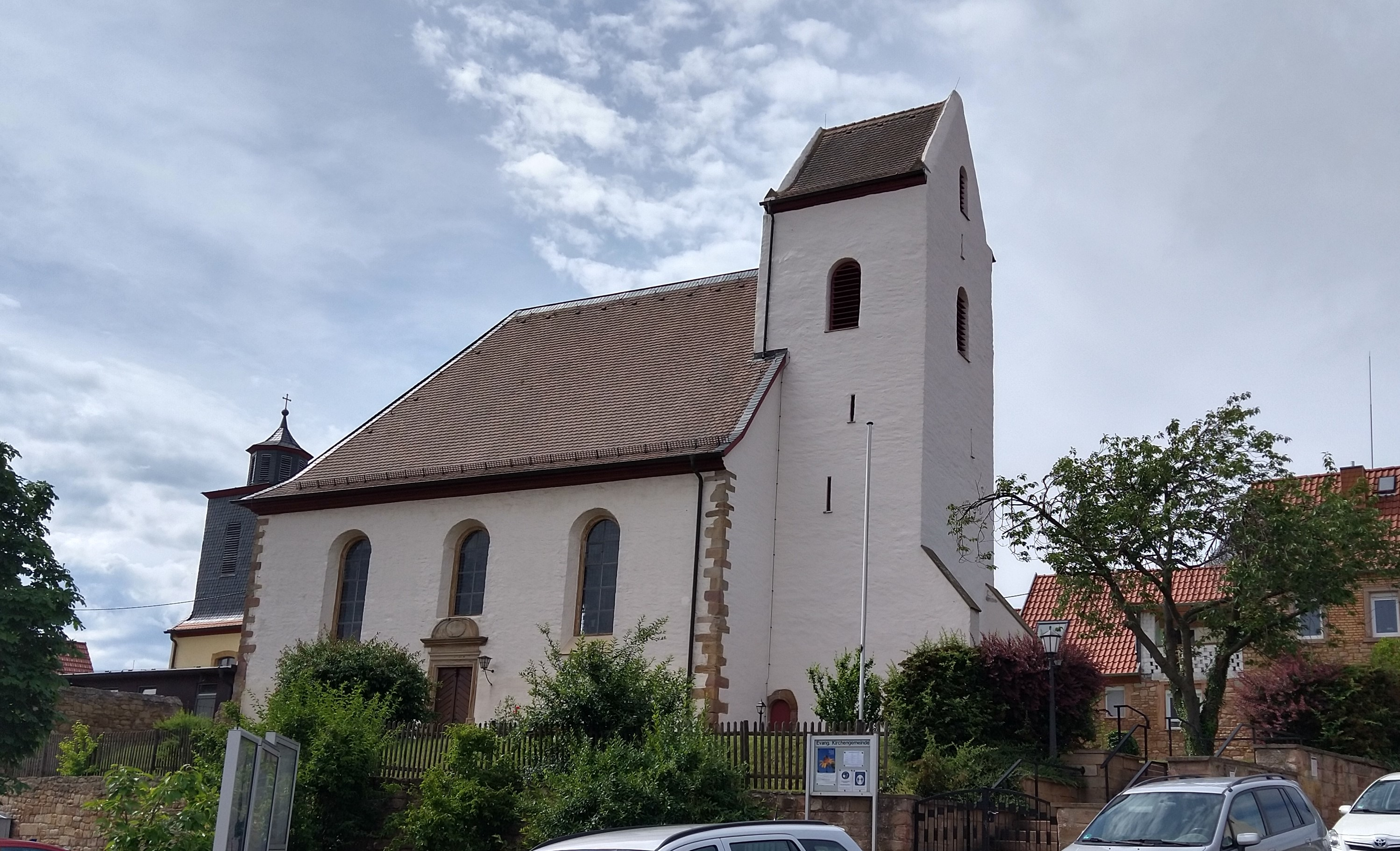
protestant church

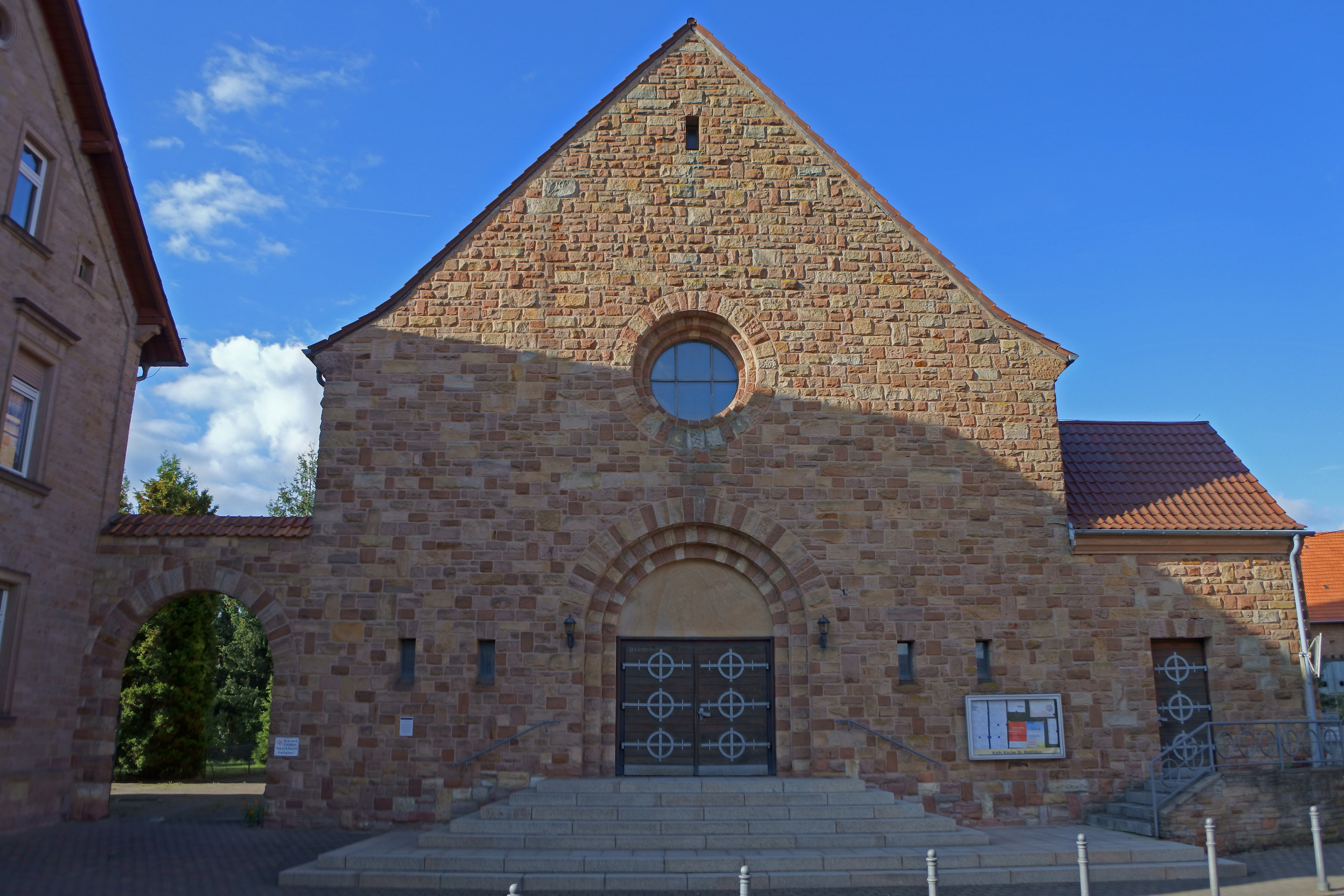
St. Matthews catholic church

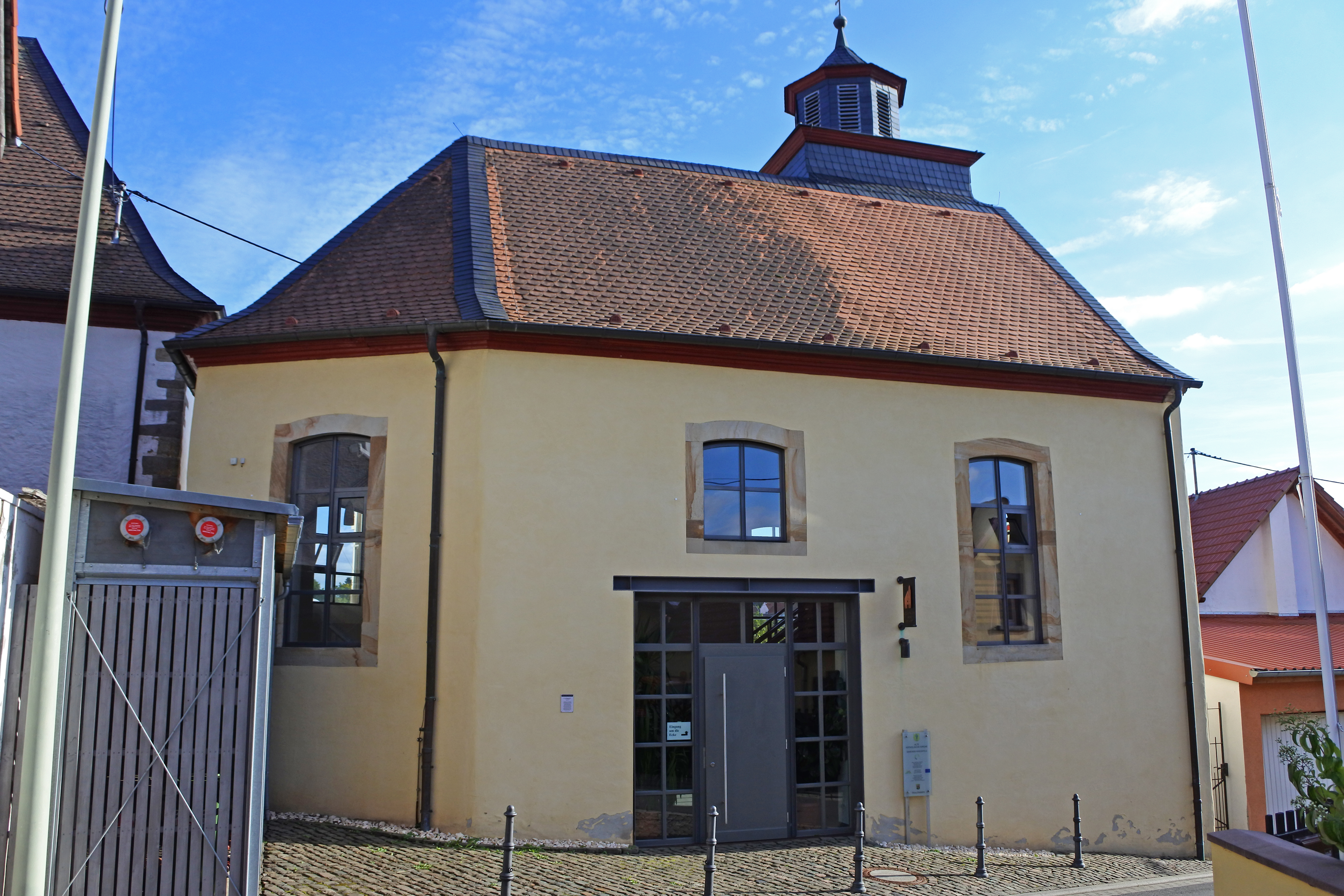
former Catholic church

== Infrastructure ==
=== Traffic ===
Three state roads intersect in the village center. The A63 highway is 13 km (8 mi) to the southeast. A train station can be found in Kirchheimbolanden.

=== Education ===
Kriegsfeld has a kindergarten and an elementary school.

=== Military ===
After World War II the Seventh United States Army had several facilities in Kriegsfeld, which were all closed between 1991 and 2000. The 59th Ordnance Brigade maintained the Kriegsfeld Ammunition Depot. The German Bundeswehr ran a facility at the Wasenbacher Höhe south of the village.
