= Rittersheim =

- Municipality
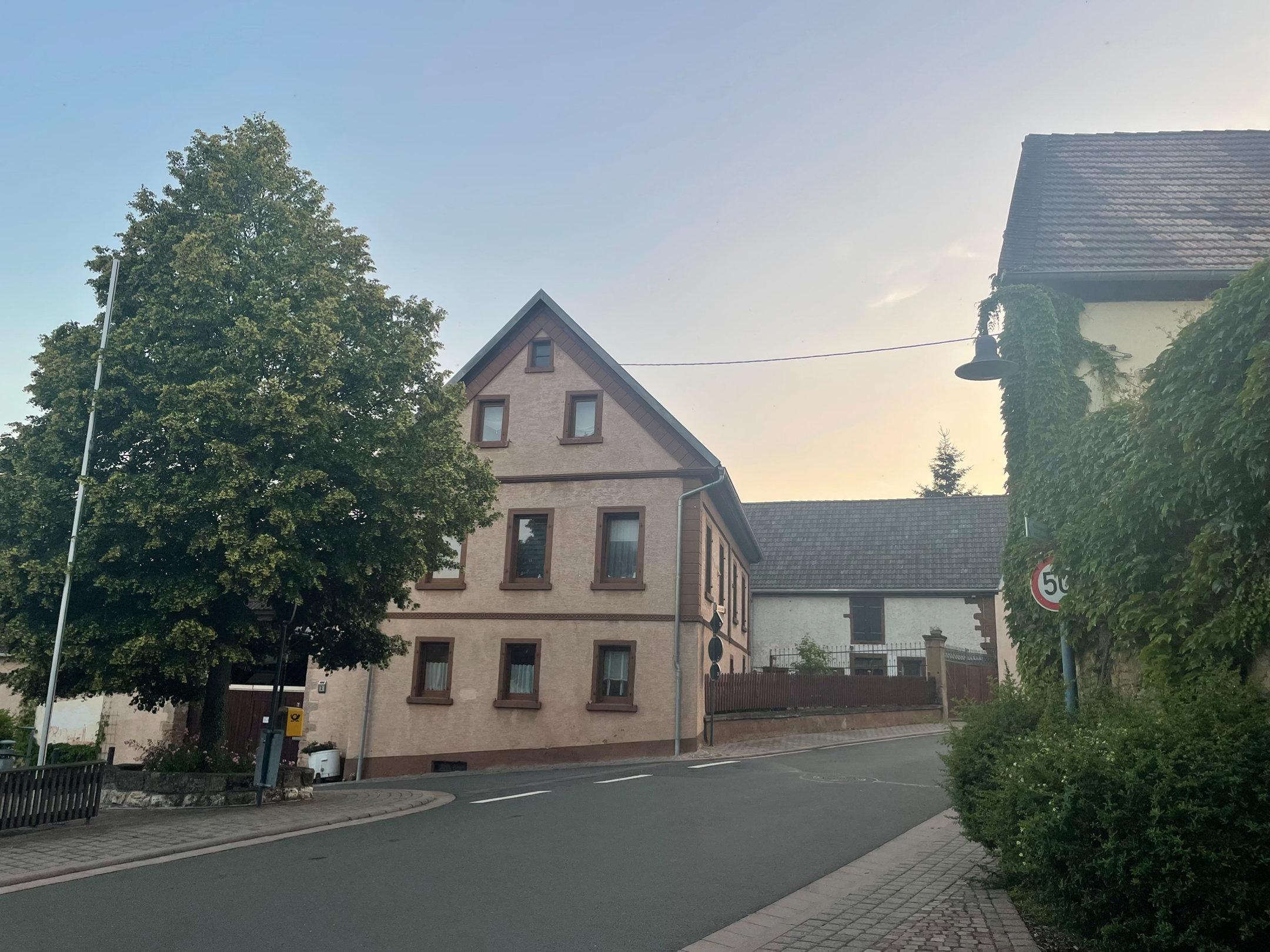
- Farm in the village center

- Coat of arms

- Location of Rittersheim within Donnersbergkreis district
- Interactive map of Rittersheim
- Location within Germany Location within Rhineland-Palatinate
- Coordinates: 49°40′5.50″N 8°3′32.52″E
- Country: Germany
- State: Rhineland-Palatinate
- District: Donnersbergkreis
- Municipal assoc.: Kirchheimbolanden

Government
  - Mayor (2019–24): Marc-Guido Ebert

Area
  - Total: 3.95 km^{2} (1.53 sq mi)
- Elevation: 228 m (748 ft)

Population (2025-12-31)
  - Total: 188
  - Density: 47.6/km^{2} (123/sq mi)
- Time zone: UTC+01:00 (CET)
  - Summer (DST): UTC+02:00 (CEST)
- Postal codes: 67294
- Dialling codes: 06352
- Vehicle registration: KIB

Rittersheim (German pronunciation: [ˈʁɪtɐshaɪm]) is a municipality in the Donnersbergkreis district, in Rhineland-Palatinate, Germany.

== Geography ==
The village is about 3 km (2 mi) east of Kirchheimbolanden in the valley of the Leiselbach stream. Neighbouring municipalities are Bischheim, Ilbesheim, Stetten and Gauersheim.

== History ==
The oldest written proof of Rittersheim‘s existence dates to the time around the year 900. In the early Middle Ages it belonged to the Duchy of Franconia. In later times Otterberg Abbey, as well as St. Maximin's Abbey owned properties in the village.

== Politics ==
=== Council ===
The village council is composed of 6 members who were elected in a personalized proportional representation in the local elections on June 9, 2024, and the honorary mayor as chairman.

=== Heraldry ===
The coat of arms shows Saint Maximin of Trier in golden clothing with a crozier in his left and swearing with his right hand. To his sides are the letters S and M.

Maximin shows the connection of Rittersheim with Saint Maximin's Abbey in Trier. The letters also stand for him (sanctus Maximinus).

== Infrastructure ==
The A63 highway is about 3 km (2 mi) west of Rittersheim. The nearest train station is in Kirchheimbolanden.
