= Oberwiesen =

- Municipality
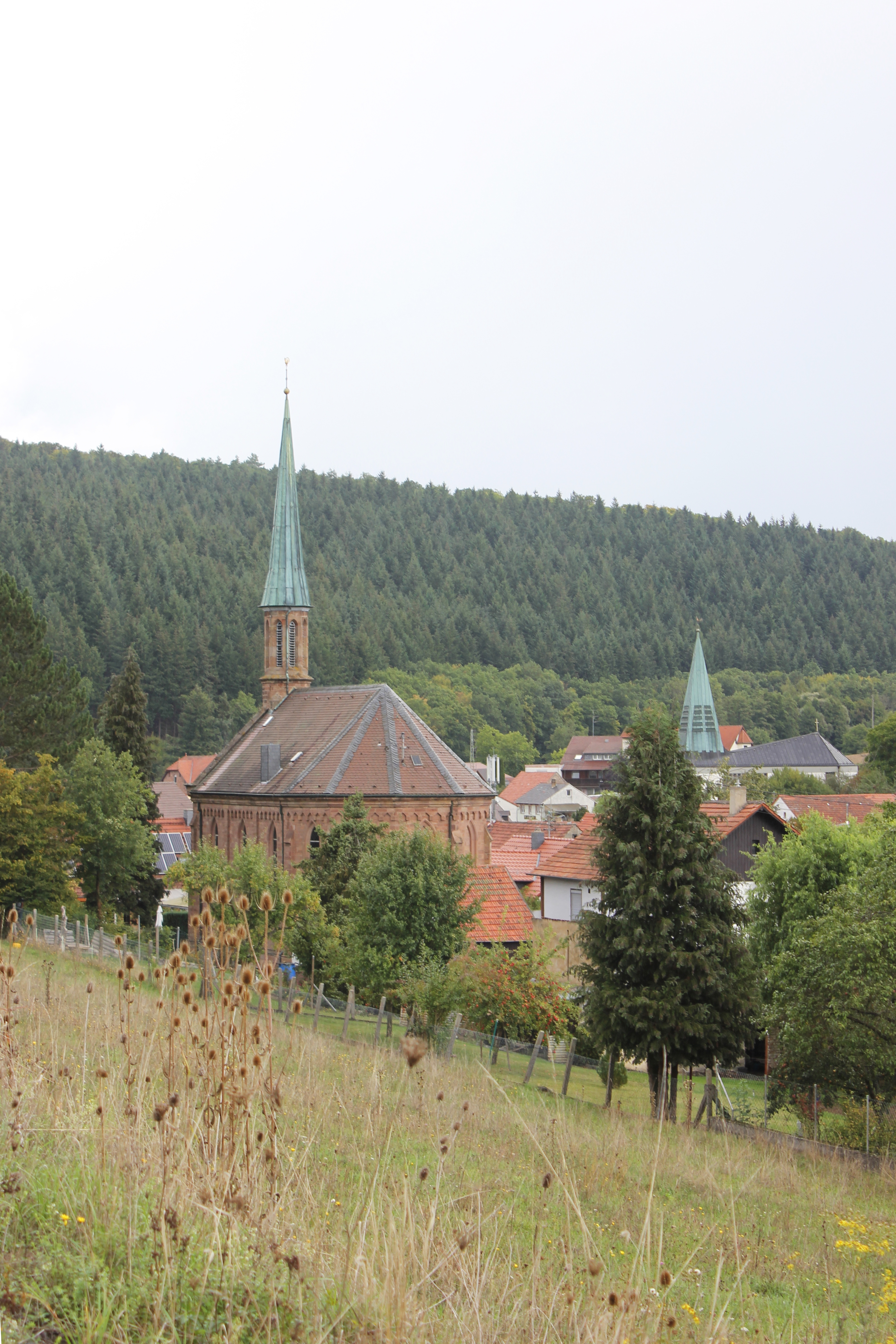

- Coat of arms

- Location of Oberwiesen within Donnersbergkreis district
- Interactive map of Oberwiesen
- Location within Germany Location within Rhineland-Palatinate
- Coordinates: 49°41′54.39″N 7°57′38.55″E
- Country: Germany
- State: Rhineland-Palatinate
- District: Donnersbergkreis
- Municipal assoc.: Kirchheimbolanden

Government
  - Mayor (2019–24): Heike Renz

Area
  - Total: 1.61 km^{2} (0.62 sq mi)
- Elevation: 250 m (820 ft)

Population (2025-12-31)
  - Total: 527
  - Density: 327/km^{2} (848/sq mi)
- Time zone: UTC+01:00 (CET)
  - Summer (DST): UTC+02:00 (CEST)
- Postal codes: 67294
- Dialling codes: 06358
- Vehicle registration: KIB

Oberwiesen is a municipality in the Donnersbergkreis district, in Rhineland-Palatinate, Germany. It is one of the smallest municipalities in the country by area.

== Geography ==
Oberwiesen is situated in the North Palatine Uplands, about 8 km (5 mi) north of its highest peak, the Donnersberg. It borders Kriegsfeld, Offenheim, Orbis and Kirchheimbolanden.

The Wiesbach stream flows through the village.

== History ==
It is said that the area was settled around the year 1200 arranged by noblemen from nearby Morschheim. They were vassals of the Counts of Bolanden. Who ruled the village until it was given to the imperial counts of Nassau-Weilburg due to financial troubles.

Other sources state that the location of modern day Oberwiesen was settled later then other areas. The origins of the village are unknown, it is suspected that a place named Wisha, mentioned as part of the Dominion of Stauf corresponds to Oberwiesen. It was part of the Dominion in the 14th century but given away as fief.

In the following centuries multiple rulers had control over Oberwiesen.

After the War of the First Coalition Oberwiesen was occupied and later annexed by France with the Treaty of Campo Formio in 1797. From 1798 to 1814 it belonged to the French Departement du Mont-Tonnerre. After the Congress of Vienna the region was first given to Austria (1815) and later to Bavaria (1816).

After World War II Oberwiesen became part of Rhineland-Palatinate (1946). Since 1969 it belongs to the Donnersbergkreis district.

== Politics ==
=== Council ===
The village council is composed of 12 members who were elected in a personalized proportional representation in the local elections on June 9, 2024, and the honorary mayor as chairman.

=== Heraldry ===
The coat of arms was bestowed to the municipality in 1844 by Ludwig I of Bavaria and traces its roots to a seal from 1779.

== Religion ==
The catholics belong to the Diocese of Speyer and are administered by the parish in Kirchheimbolanden. The protestants are part of Morschheim‘s congregation in the Evangelical Church of the Palatinate.

== Culture and sights ==
=== Buildings ===
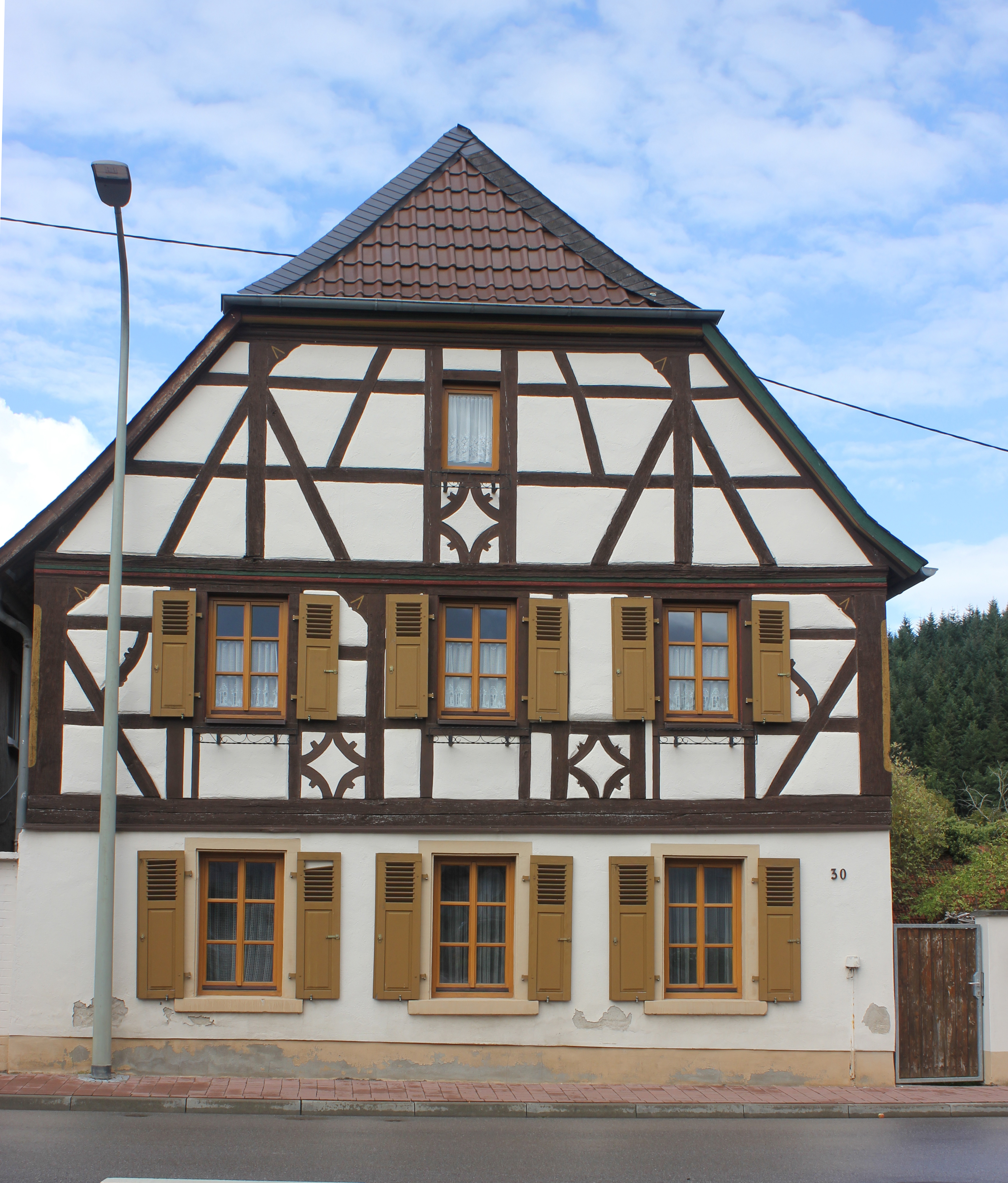
protected house

There are three protected buildings in the municipality, under which is the protestant church. A catholic church is located in the village center.

=== Festivals ===
The local Kerwe is celebrated yearly on the last weekend of August.

== Infrastructure ==
The nearest highway exit is along A63 near Kirchheimbolanden (9 km). The nearest train station is also located there.

Bus line 902 of the VRN (Verkehrsverbund Rhein-Neckar) connects Oberwiesen to Kirchheimbolanden and Gaugrehweiler.
