= Bischheim, Germany =

Bischheim
- Municipality
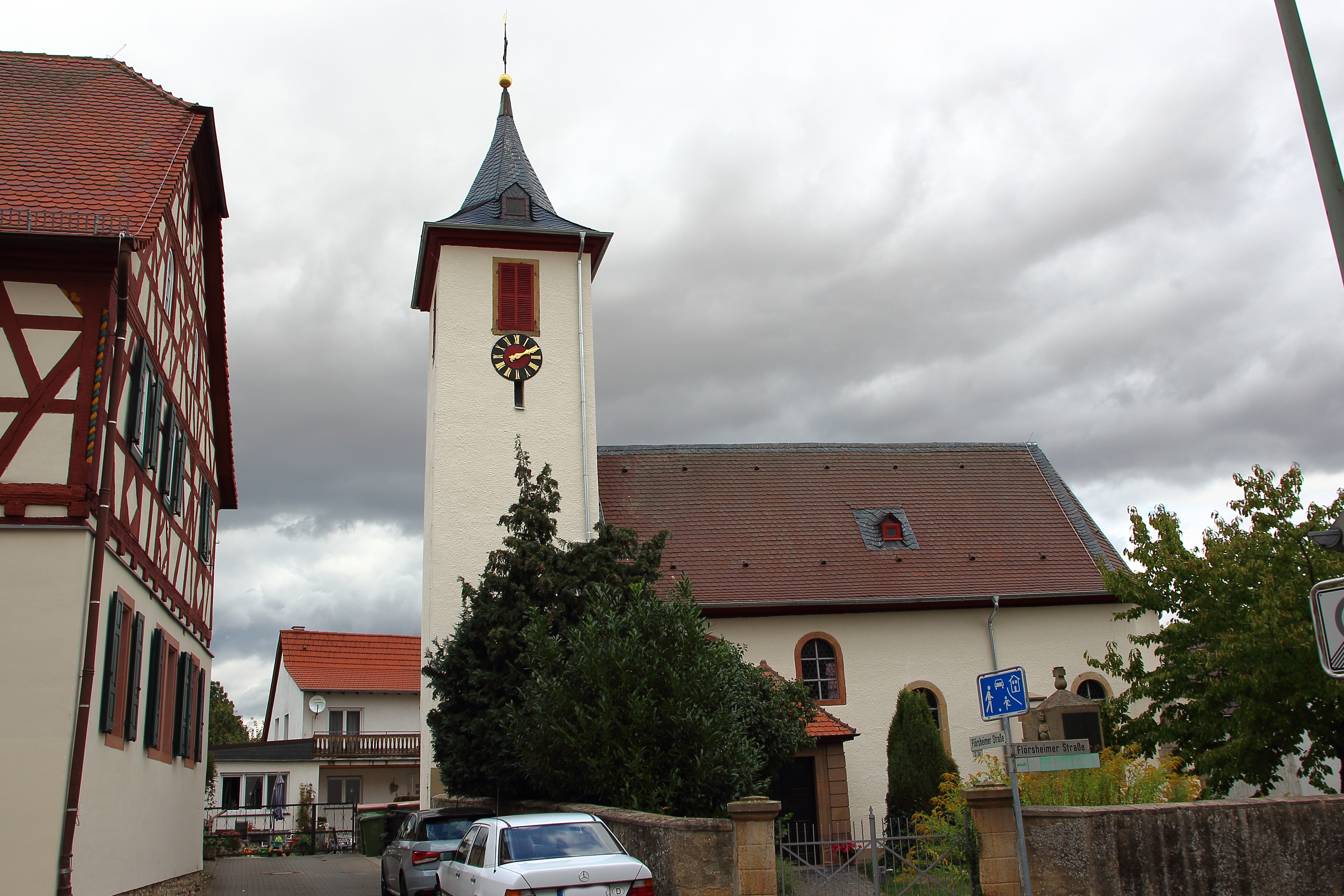
- protestant church

- Coat of arms

- Location of Bischheim within Donnersbergkreis district
- Interactive map of Bischheim
- Location within Germany Location within Rhineland-Palatinate
- Coordinates: 49°40′15.55″N 8°2′3.44″E
- Country: Germany
- State: Rhineland-Palatinate
- District: Donnersbergkreis
- Municipal assoc.: Kirchheimbolanden

Government
  - Mayor (2019–24): Michael Brack

Area
  - Total: 6.61 km^{2} (2.55 sq mi)
- Elevation: 224 m (735 ft)

Population (2025-12-31)
  - Total: 758
  - Density: 115/km^{2} (297/sq mi)
- Time zone: UTC+01:00 (CET)
  - Summer (DST): UTC+02:00 (CEST)
- Postal codes: 67294
- Dialling codes: 06352
- Vehicle registration: KIB
- Website: www.bischheim.de

Bischheim (German pronunciation: [ˈbɪʃhaɪm]) is a municipality in the Donnersbergkreis district, in Rhineland-Palatinate, Germany. Bischheim has an area of 6.57 km^{2} and a population of 799 (as of December 31, 2020).

== Geography ==
The village is located in the Alzey Hills, a subdivision of the Rhenish-Hessian Hills. The Leiselbach and Gutleutbach streams flow through the area.

Neighbouring municipalities are Morschheim, Ilbesheim, Rittersheim, Gauersheim and Kirchheimbolanden.

Besides the village proper, the inhabited places Am steinernen Berg, Heubergerhof, Heubergermühle, Jägerhaus, Kupfermühle and Pulvermühle are part of the municipality.

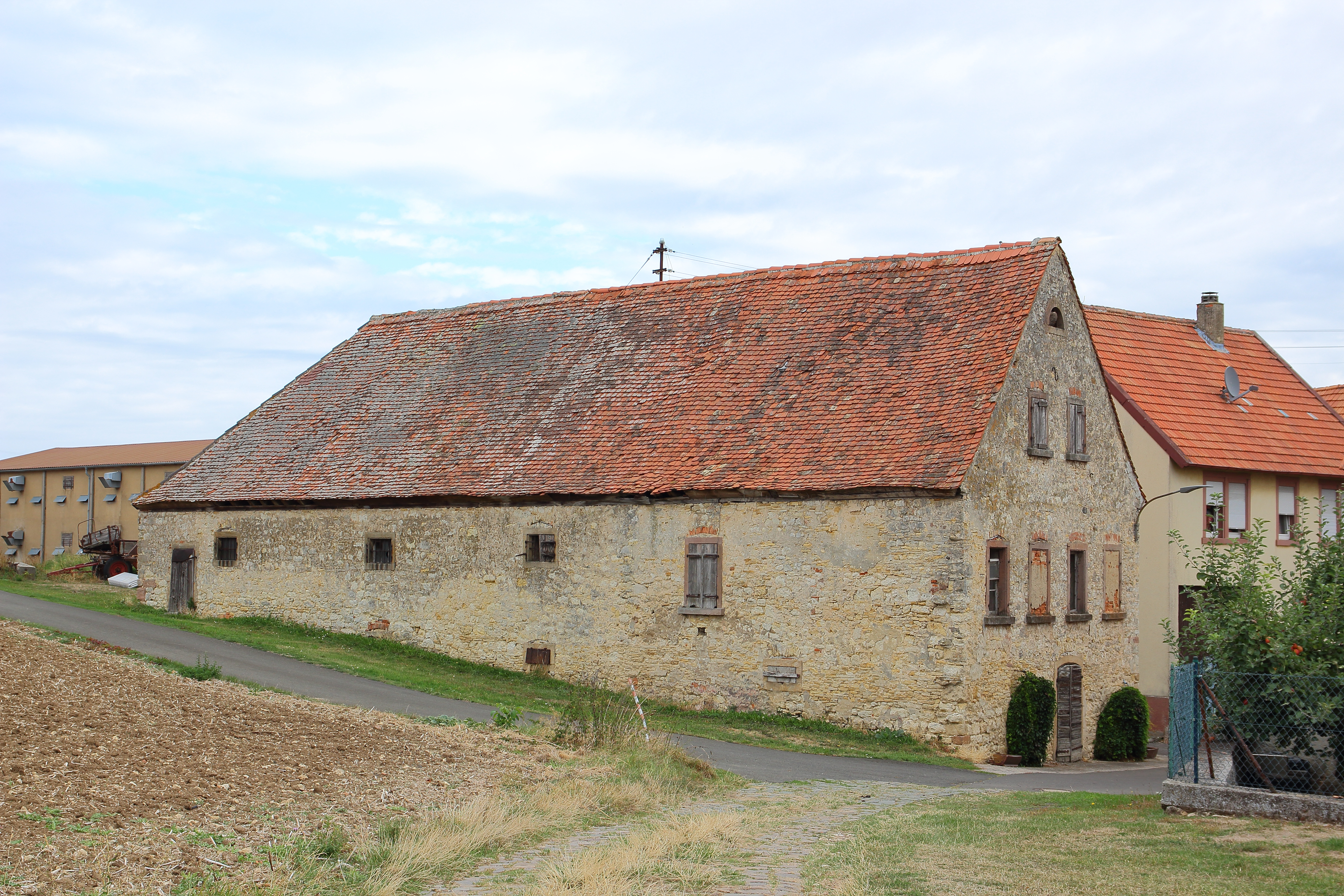
Heubergerhof

== History ==
=== Early history ===
Remains of a neolithic settlement were found in the area which gave the Bischheim culture their name.

=== Middle Ages ===
Bischheim was once called Bischofsheim.

A Local knight named Stephan gave his estate to Rothenkirchen Abbey before 1181. In 1226 he and Jakob of Bischheim vouched for a document of Hane Abbey in nearby Bolanden. Gerung of Bischheim also gave his properties in Marnheim to the abbey in 1202. King Frederick II gifted the village's church to the Abbey of the Holy Sepulchre in Speyer to save his soul. In 1442 a chapel or small church with at least two altars is documented in Bischheim. The church was part of the parish of Kirchheimbolanden in 1501. Otterberg Abbey held estates in the village.

=== Early modern era ===
The congregation became protestant in the 16th century. Since 1698 the church was used by protestants and catholics.

During the Thirty Years' War the village was completely abandoned. In 1657 only eight houses were inhabited again. Until the end of the 18th century Bischheim was part of the Dominion of Kirchheim that belonged to the House of Nassau-Weilburg. In 1802 the village had 359 inhabitants: 12 Catholics, 309 Lutherans, 30 Reformeds and 8 Mennonites.

=== Modern era ===
After the War of the First Coalition Bischheim was occupied and later annexed by France with the Treaty of Campo Formio in 1797. From 1798 to 1814 it belonged to the French Departement du Mont-Tonnerre. After the Congress of Vienna the region was first given to Austria (1815) and later to Bavaria (1816).

After World War II Bischheim became part of Rhineland-Palatinate (1946). Since 1969 it belongs to the Donnersbergkreis district.

== Politics ==
=== Council ===
The village council is composed of 12 members who were elected in a personalized proportional representation in the local elections on June 9, 2024, and the honorary mayor as chairman.

=== Heraldry ===
The coat of arms shows a lion holding a wheel. The lion is taken from the house of Nassau-Weilburg to which Bischeim belonged until the late 18th century. The wheel symbolises the noblemen from Bolanden who owned part of the village in medieval times. It was granted by the Bavarian Ministry of the Interior on 13 March 1931.

== Economy and infrastructure ==
=== Economy ===
The biggest job provider in the village is the Karl Bindewald GmbH that runs a mill. Viticulture is practiced, as part of the Palatinate (wine region).

=== Roads ===
The L386 runs as a bypass road around Bischheim. The A63 highway runs directly to the west, making Mainz and Kaiserslautern easily accessible. An access road leads to Heubergerhof and Heubergermühle.

=== Public transit ===
Bischheim is served by several bus lines of the VRN. The nearest train station is Kirchheimbolanden along the Donnersberg Railway, 1.5 km (1 mi) west of the village.
