= Ilbesheim =

- Municipality
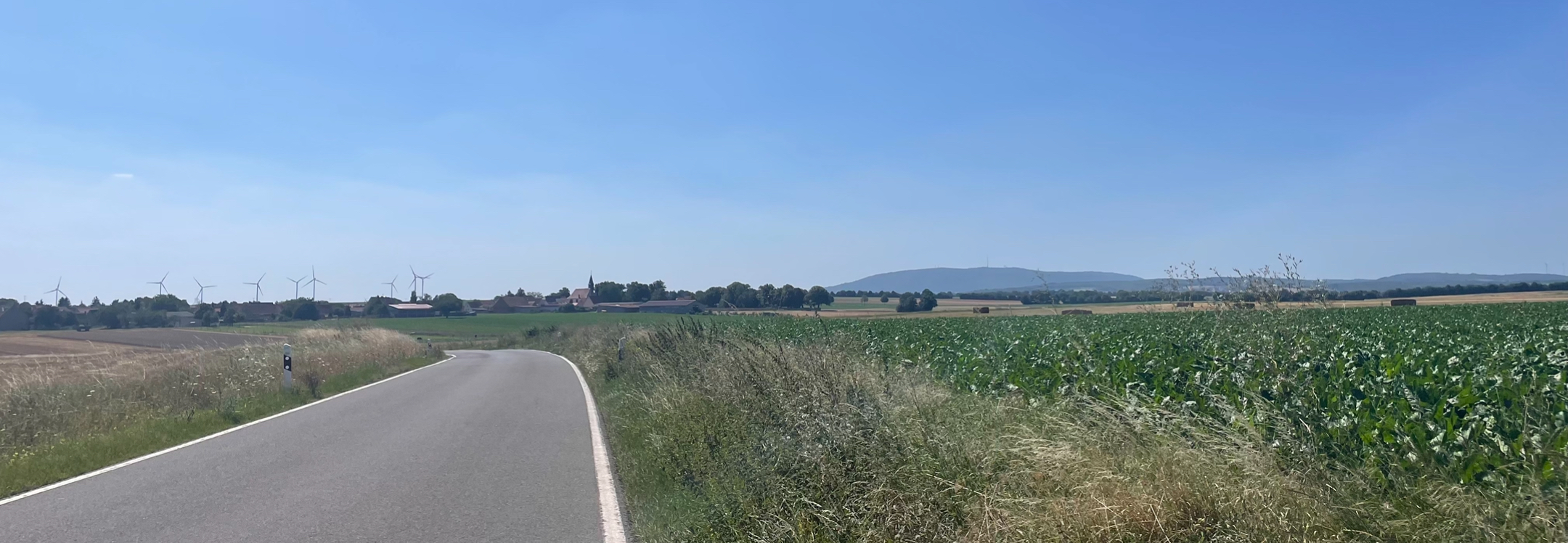
- Ilbesheim on its plateau, Donnersberg in the background

- Coat of arms

- Location of Ilbesheim within Donnersbergkreis district
- Interactive map of Ilbesheim
- Location within Germany Location within Rhineland-Palatinate
- Coordinates: 49°41′24″N 8°04′31″E
- Country: Germany
- State: Rhineland-Palatinate
- District: Donnersbergkreis
- Municipal assoc.: Kirchheimbolanden

Government
  - Mayor (2019–24): Dieter Schröder

Area
  - Total: 6.11 km^{2} (2.36 sq mi)
- Elevation: 297 m (974 ft)

Population (2025-12-31)
  - Total: 598
  - Density: 97.9/km^{2} (253/sq mi)
- Time zone: UTC+01:00 (CET)
  - Summer (DST): UTC+02:00 (CEST)
- Postal codes: 67294
- Dialling codes: 06352, 06355
- Vehicle registration: KIB

Ilbesheim (German pronunciation: [ˈɪlbəshaɪm]) is a municipality in the Donnersbergkreis district, in Rhineland-Palatinate, Germany.

== Geography ==
Ilbesheim is located in the Alzey Hills. 87% of its area are used for agriculture on the fertile soils of the Ilbesheimer Loessschwelle.

The former train station of Morschheim is partly located on Ilbesheim's territory.

Neighbouring municipalities are Freimersheim, Flomborn, Stetten, Rittersheim, Bischheim and Morschheim.

== History ==
Ilbesheim is first mentioned in documents dating back to the 8th century. Graves from the La Tène era have been found, which suggest a much longer settlement history. The Protestant church has a tower dating back to the time around the year 1100.

Early on the village became an exclave of County of Falkenstein which was ruled by the Counts of Bolanden whose successors were the Counts of Virneburg in 1418.

The County of Falkenstein with its villages fell to the Duchy of Lorraine and with the marriage of its duke Francis I to Maria Theresa, it became a part of Austria. Ilbesheim was administrated as part of the Oberamt Winnweiler in Further Austria.

In 1756 the Protestant majority sent deputies to Vienna to complain about the mandated sharing of the church with the Catholics. In 1758 a letter was sent to the emperor complaining about the first Corpus Christi procession through the village.

A new church was built in 1790, with a wall separating the two denominations in the building. It was torn down in 1968.

After the War of the First Coalition Ilbesheim was occupied and later annexed by France with the Treaty of Campo Formio in 1797. From 1798 to 1814 it belonged to the French Departement du Mont-Tonnerre. After the Congress of Vienna the region was first given to Austria (1815) and later to Bavaria (1816).

After World War II Ilbesheim became part of Rhineland-Palatinate (1946). Since 1969 it belongs to the Donnersbergkreis district.

=== Population ===
year	inhabitants
1815	470
1835	635
1871	634
1905	581
1939	531

year	inhabitants
1950	677
1961	604
1970	523
1987	466
2005	516

== Politics ==
=== Council ===
The village council is composed of 12 members who were elected in a personalized proportional representation in the local elections on June 9, 2024, and the honorary mayor as chairman.

=== Heraldry ===
The coat of arms shows two oak branches and a stalk of grain. It was granted by the Reichsstatthalter of Bavaria in 1937 and goes back to a seal from 1683.

The court seal used in 1622 showed an oak branch without leaves crossed with a stalk of grain.

== Religion ==
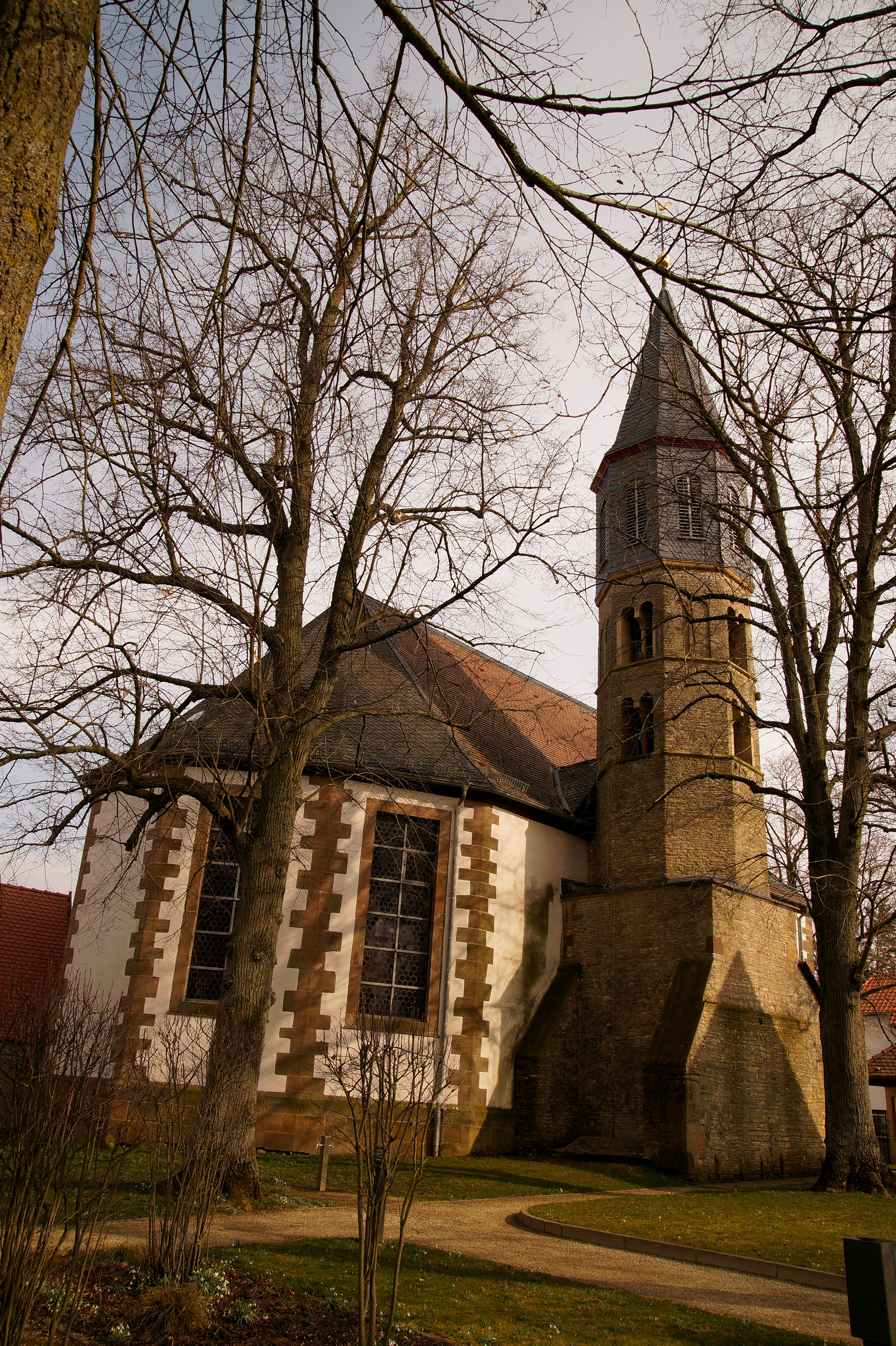
Protestant church

The Protestant church was a simultaneum until 1968, when the Catholics built their own chapel dedicated to Saint John. The Protestants are part of the parish of Gauersheim, the Catholics are managed by the parish of Kirchheimbolanden.

== Economy and infrastructure ==
The plateau on witch Ilbesheim is located is composed of very fertile loess soil, which made agriculture an influencal sector in the past. Today most people commute to the nearby metropolitan areas.

The A63 highway exit is 4 km (2.5 mi) north of Ilbesheim. The nearest train station is Freimersheim along the Donnersberg Railway.
