= Eugen Wolf =

German journalist and traveler

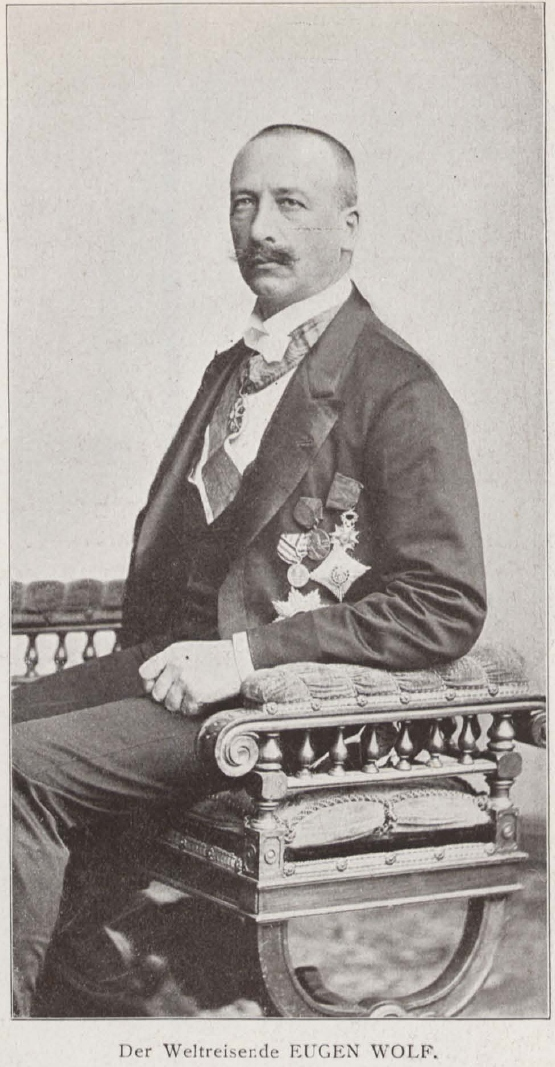
- Wolf in 1899
- Born: 24 January 1850; Kirchheimbolanden, Rhineland-Palatinate
- Died: 10 May 1912 (aged 62); Munich, Bavaria
- Occupation: Journalist
- Writing career
- Subject: Travel

Eugen Wolf (born 24 January 1850 in Kirchheimbolanden; died 10 May 1912 in Munich) was a German journalist and traveller.

== Life ==
He devoted most of his life to travelling, first within Europe and then to the New World, Africa, and the Far East. In 1873 he journeyed to South America, followed by trips to central Africa (1884-1885), the United States (1887), East Africa (1889- 1890), South Africa (1891-1892), Madagascar (1895). Between August, 1896, and June, 1898, he travelled extensively in China, Japan, and Siberia. In 1909, three years before his death, he visited Oceania. Both in Germany and abroad, Wolf, a polyglot, met with politicians, businessmen, and diplomats to promote an expanded role in world affairs for the newly founded German Empire. He envisioned international trade as a key element in Germany's development as a world power and lobbied for increased exchange of German manufactured goods for raw materials from other countries, particularly China.

An ardent nationalist, he feared that the growing presence of Russians, Americans, and Japanese in China would limit the possibilities for German expansion there. He expressed his concerns to former Chancellor Otto von Bismarck during a series of meetings before departing for China in 1896 and repeated them in his account of his travels, Meine Wanderungen, I: Im Innern Chinas ("My Travels, I: In Inner China"), published in 1901. While in China he visited many foreign concessions, and, based on this firsthand experience, he developed a plan for German expansion there, which he proposed to the Ministry of Foreign Affairs in Berlin upon his return (Wolf, 1904)

== Works ==
- Vom Fürsten Bismarck und seinem Haus: Tagebuchblatter von Eugen Wolf

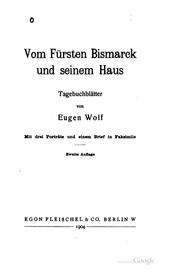
Vom Fὕrsten Bismarck und seinem Haus

- Meine Wanderungen: Im Innern Chinas

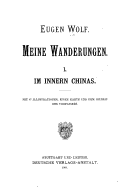

Wolf was a prolific writer, publishing narratives of travels in several books and in a number of newspaper articles, which appeared primarily in the Berliner Tageblatt. He used his writings to promote the approach to international relations, both political and economic, that he believed Germany should follow. He also linked his extensive collecting activities to his international agenda, commenting that he "donated ethnographic collections to Bavarian and Prussian museums to instruct young Germans about foreign cultures".

== The Chukchi Collection ==
The Chukchi collection, apparently assembled in the late nineteenth century, was officially received by the museum on 14 January 1899 (SMV Archives, 1899), as a single donation from Eugen Wolf, a German philanthropist and journalist. Das Staatliche Museum fur Volkerkunde (SMV), Munchen(the Munich State Museum of Anthropology), is one of Europe's major anthropological museums, with collections comprising about 350,000 specimens from all parts of the world.

About 500 items are from Siberia; a few of these date from the eighteenth century, and the remainder date from the nineteenth and twentieth centuries. Acquired over the years from several different donors, the museum's Siberian collection includes objects from various regions of Siberia, but the majority are from the Chukchi and the Yuit Eskimos of the Chukotka in northeastern Siberia. Although the precise origins of the collection are unknown (it is doubtful that Wolf made the collection himself), it is of considerable significance both because it attempts to document systematically all aspects of the life of these reindeer herders of the tundra and because very little material from the Chukchi of that period has been preserved in museums.

The rich variety of Chukchi clothing is documented in sets of garments for adults and for children of all ages as well as clothing used for special purposes, such as spring sealing. Recreationalitems include children's toys (a leather ball, a drum, a stuffed mouse, buzzers, toy reindeer).

After the gift to the museum in Munich, in September 1901 the Royal Bavarian Academy of Sciences honoured him with their large gold medal for services rendered to science.
