= Kirchheimbolanden (Verbandsgemeinde) =

- Verbandsgemeinde
- Coat of arms

- Location of Kirchheimbolanden within Donnersbergkreis district
- Interactive map of Kirchheimbolanden
- Location within Germany Location within Rhineland-Palatinate
- Coordinates: 49°40′N 8°01′E
- Country: Germany
- State: Rhineland-Palatinate
- District: Donnersbergkreis
- Subdivisions: 16 Gemeinden

Government
  - Mayor (2021–29): Sabine Wienpahl (SPD)

Area
  - Total: 147.35 km^{2} (56.89 sq mi)

Population (2025-12-31)
  - Total: 19,657
  - Density: 133.40/km^{2} (345.51/sq mi)
- Time zone: UTC+01:00 (CET)
  - Summer (DST): UTC+02:00 (CEST)
- Vehicle registration: KIB
- Website: www.kirchheimbolanden.de

Kirchheimbolanden is an administrative unit (Verbandsgemeinde) in the German state of Rhineland-Palatinate. Its seat is in the town Kirchheimbolanden.

== Municipalities ==
The Verbandsgemeinde ("collective municipality") Kirchheimbolanden consists of 16 Ortsgemeinden ("local municipalities").

- Bennhausen
- Bischheim
- Bolanden
- Dannenfels
- Gauersheim
- Ilbesheim
- Jakobsweiler
- Kirchheimbolanden
- Kriegsfeld
- Marnheim
- Mörsfeld
- Morschheim
- Oberwiesen
- Orbis
- Rittersheim
- Stetten
