= Mörsfeld =

- Municipality
- Coat of arms

- Location of Mörsfeld within Donnersbergkreis district
- Interactive map of Mörsfeld
- Location within Germany Location within Rhineland-Palatinate
- Coordinates: 49°44′39″N 7°56′6″E
- Country: Germany
- State: Rhineland-Palatinate
- District: Donnersbergkreis
- Municipal assoc.: Kirchheimbolanden

Government
  - Mayor (2019–24): Jan Volker

Area
  - Total: 5.25 km^{2} (2.03 sq mi)
- Elevation: 275 m (902 ft)

Population (2025-12-31)
  - Total: 473
  - Density: 90.1/km^{2} (233/sq mi)
- Time zone: UTC+01:00 (CET)
  - Summer (DST): UTC+02:00 (CEST)
- Postal codes: 67808
- Dialling codes: 06358
- Vehicle registration: KIB

Mörsfeld is a municipality in the Donnersbergkreis district, in Rhineland-Palatinate, Germany.

== History ==
The area which is now Mörsfeld was originally settled at the end of the 9th century. It was supposedly named after a settler named Moro with the oldest recorded spelling of the town as "Morßfelt." About 1 km from the town itself is a place called the Daimbacherhof; a Cistercian monastery was founded there in the 13th century. In 1525, during the Peasants' War, the town as well as the monastery were destroyed. Also in the Daimbacherhof were mercury mines which were mined successfully until the early 19th century with production only being brought to a halt during the Thirty Years' War. Mörsfeld was further ravaged during a period of war from 1792 to 1801. The town was occupied by the French in 1799 and remained in their control til 1814, when it was reincorporated into the Kingdom of Bavaria.

== Politics ==
List of mayors:

- 1660–1689, Johannes Wagner
- 1690–1719, Johann Jost Pfannkuchen
- 1794–1798, Heinrich Kaufhold
- 1798–1800, Johann Daniel Orschiedt
- 1811–1819, Johann Adam Lied
- 1819–1837, Karl Philipp Grieß
- 1837–1838, Johannes Nussbickel
- 1838–1848, Jacob Vogel
- 1848–1868, Johann Adam Wagner
- 1868–1889, Johannes Lawall
- 1890–1892, Adam Fellenberger
- 1892–1894, Philipp Jakob Vogel
- 1895–1915, Philipp Jakob Lawall
- 1974–1981, Julius Konrad
