= Stetten, Rhineland-Palatinate =

Stetten
- Municipality
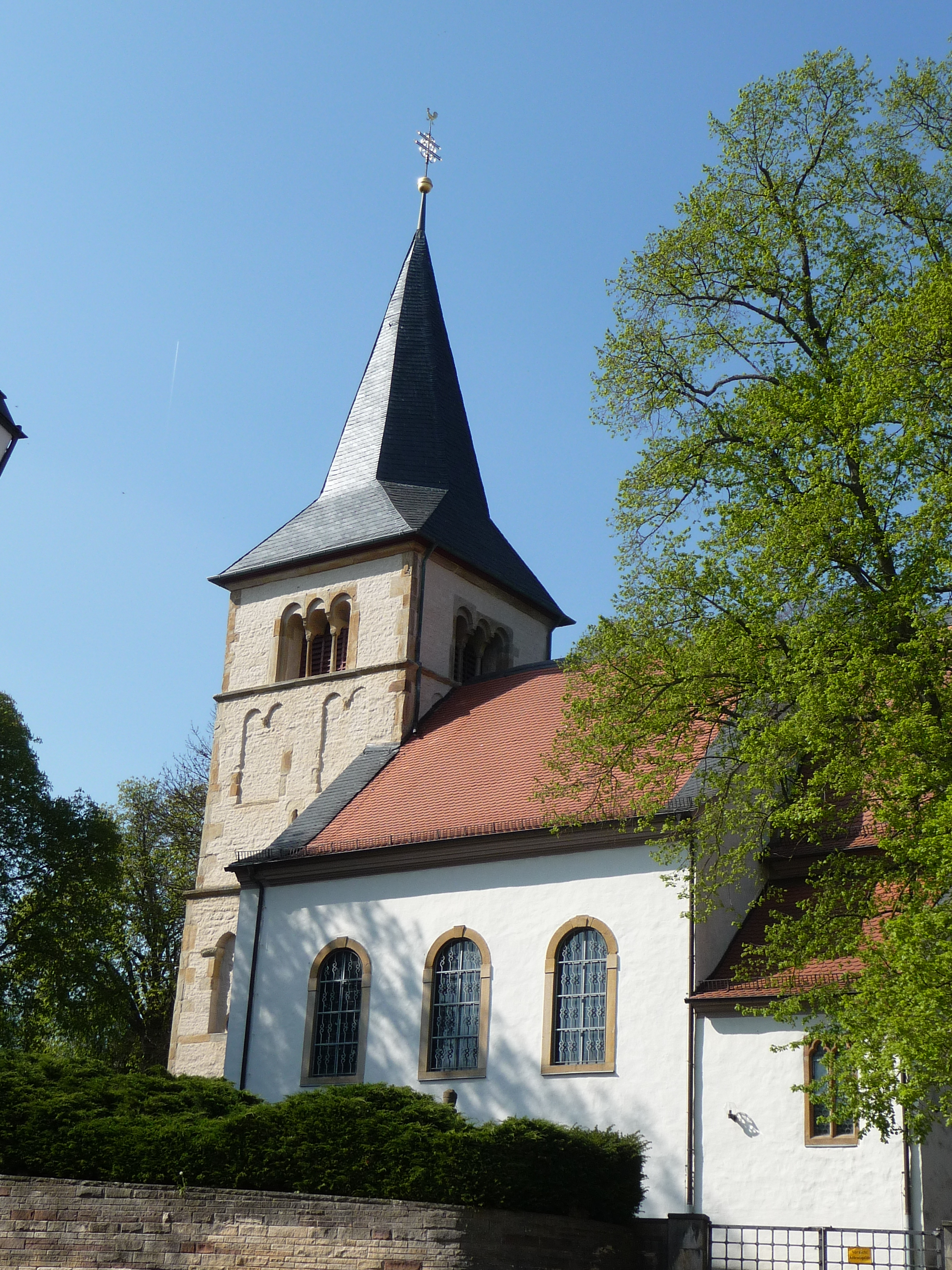
- catholic church

- Coat of arms

- Location of Stetten within Donnersbergkreis district
- Interactive map of Stetten
- Location within Germany Location within Rhineland-Palatinate
- Coordinates: 49°40′19″N 8°5′38″E
- Country: Germany
- State: Rhineland-Palatinate
- District: Donnersbergkreis
- Municipal assoc.: Kirchheimbolanden

Government
  - Mayor (2019–24): Kai Uwe Angermayer

Area
  - Total: 6.54 km^{2} (2.53 sq mi)
- Elevation: 235 m (771 ft)

Population (2025-12-31)
  - Total: 652
  - Density: 99.7/km^{2} (258/sq mi)
- Time zone: UTC+01:00 (CET)
  - Summer (DST): UTC+02:00 (CEST)
- Postal codes: 67294
- Dialling codes: 06355
- Vehicle registration: KIB
- Website: www.kirchheimbolanden.de

Stetten (German pronunciation: [ˈʃtɛtn̩]) is a municipality in Rhineland-Palatinate, Germany. It is in the Kirchheimbolanden Verbandsgemeinde (administrative unit).

== History ==
The first documented record of Stetten occurred in 835.

Stetten was very badly damaged by 1635 due to the Thirty Years' War.

The region of Stetten, Palatinate was previously a district of the Kingdom of Bavaria. It became part of Rhineland-Palatinate in 1946.
