= Kirchheimbolanden =

- Town
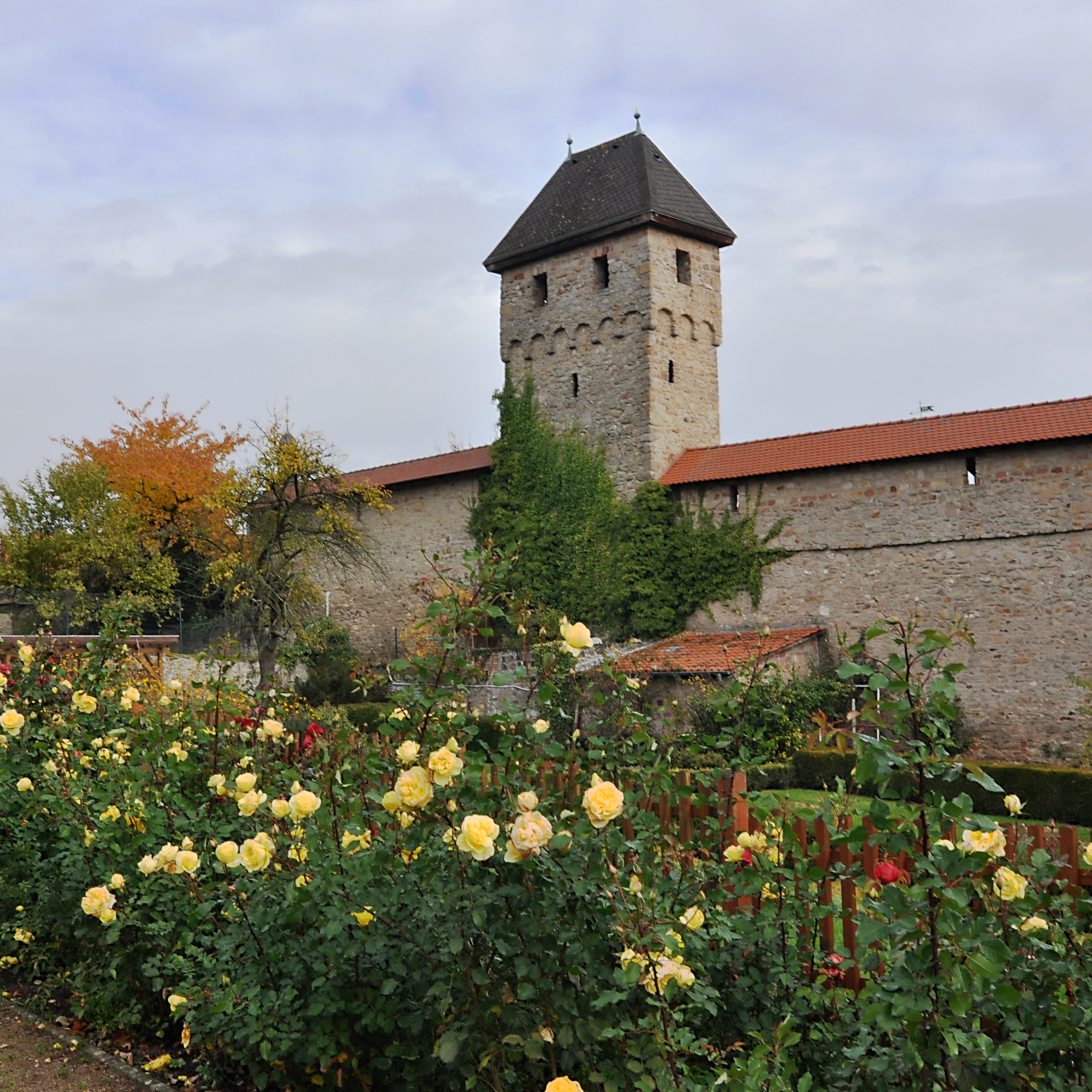
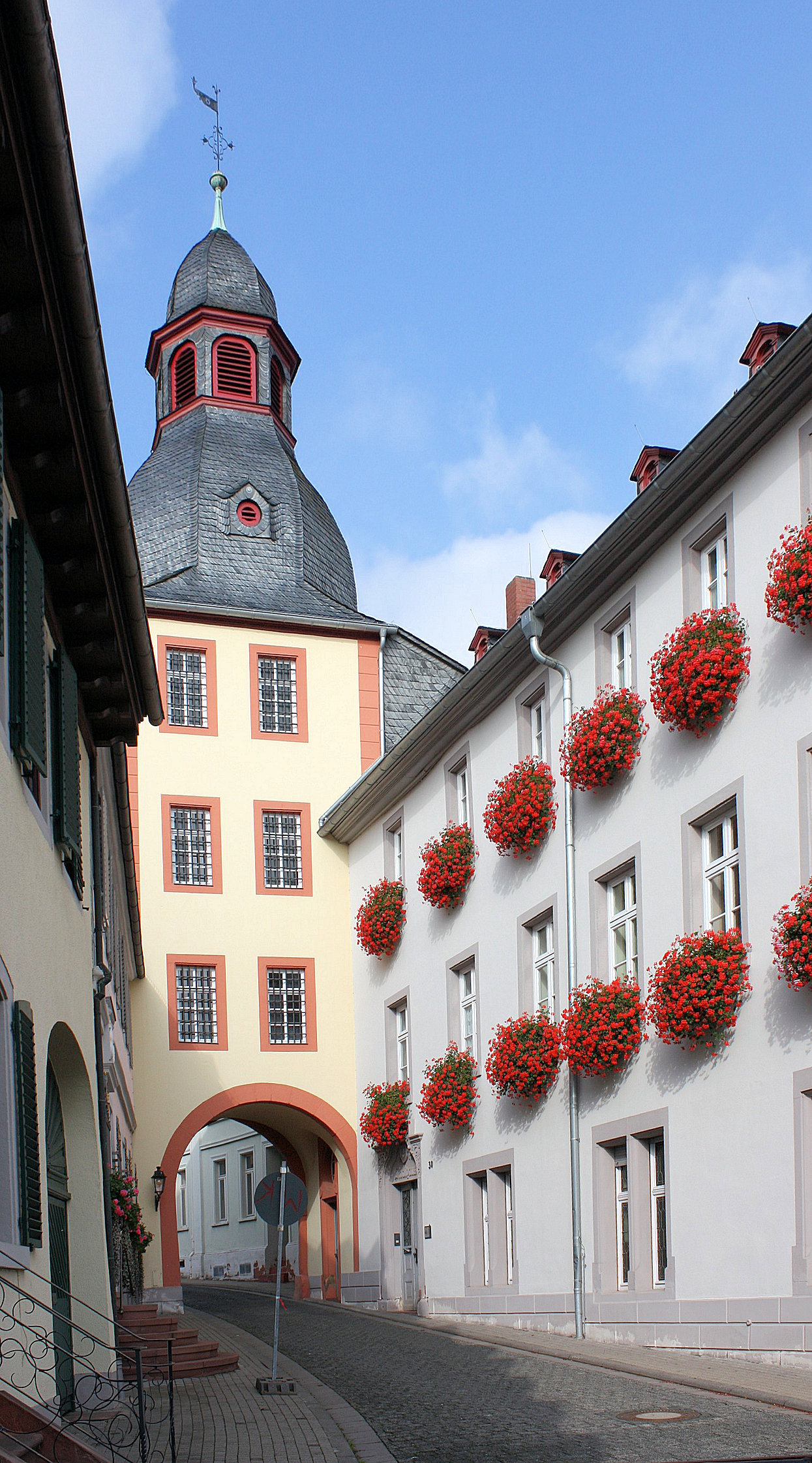
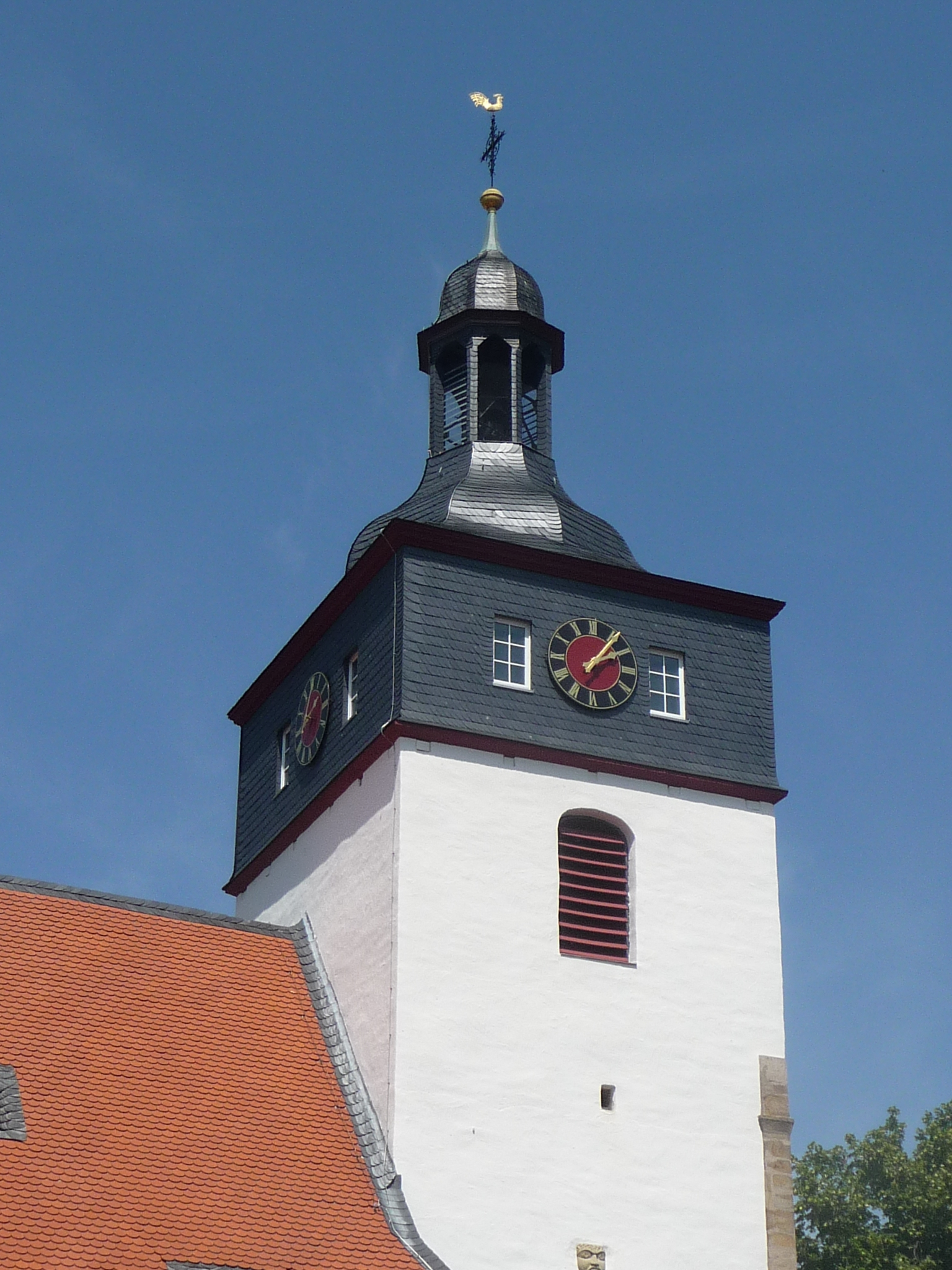
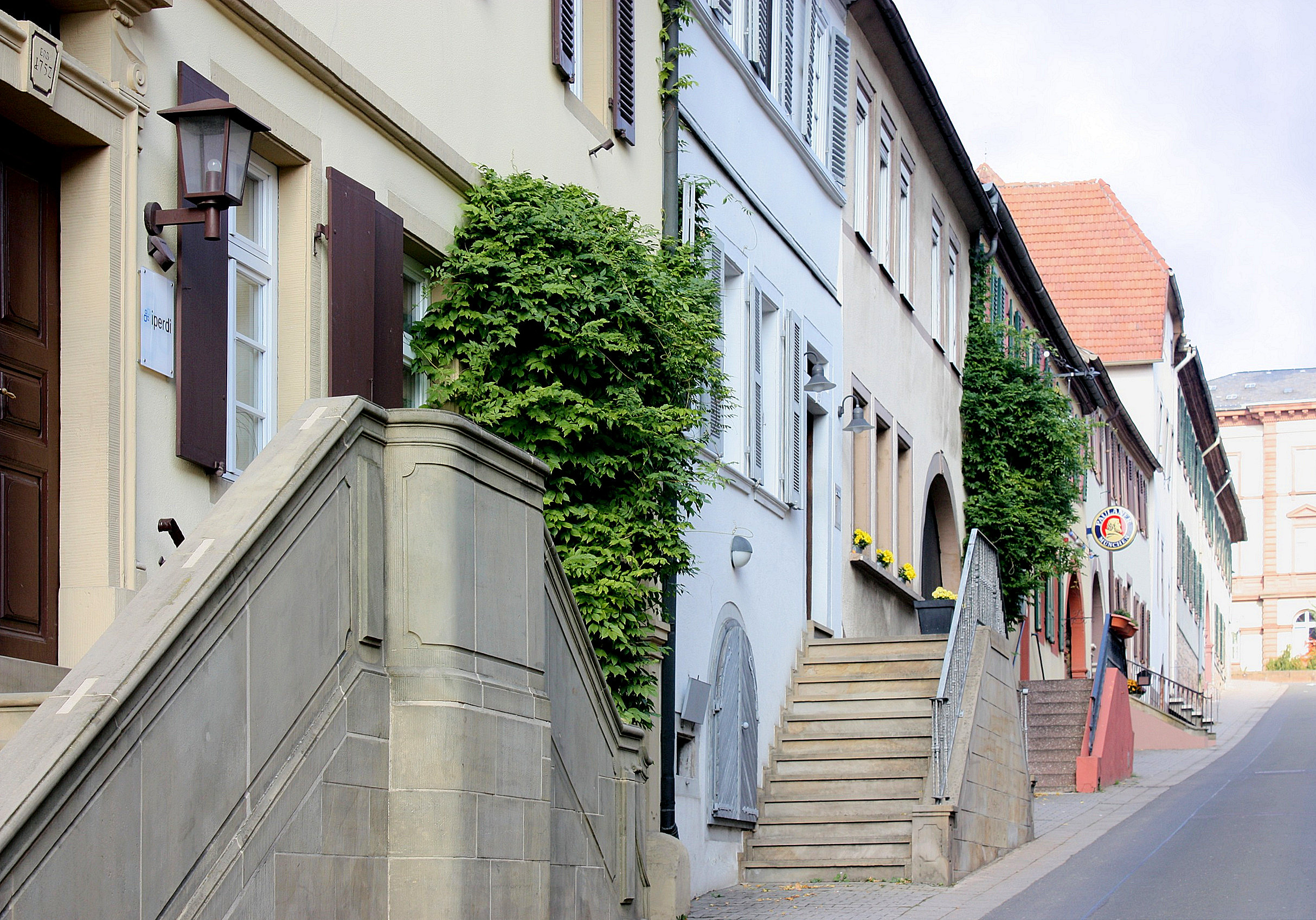
- city wall and grey tower Apothekerturm St. Peter‘s church Amtsstraße

- Coat of arms

- Location of Kirchheimbolanden within Donnersbergkreis district
- Interactive map of Kirchheimbolanden
- Location within Germany Location within Rhineland-Palatinate
- Coordinates: 49°39′59″N 8°0′42″E
- Country: Germany
- State: Rhineland-Palatinate
- District: Donnersbergkreis
- Municipal assoc.: Kirchheimbolanden

Government
  - Mayor (2019–24): Marc Muchow (CDU)

Area
  - Total: 26.36 km^{2} (10.18 sq mi)
- Elevation: 232 m (761 ft)

Population (2025-12-31)
  - Total: 7,921
  - Density: 300.5/km^{2} (778.3/sq mi)
- Time zone: UTC+01:00 (CET)
  - Summer (DST): UTC+02:00 (CEST)
- Postal codes: 67292
- Dialling codes: 06352
- Vehicle registration: KIB
- Website: www.kirchheimbolanden.de

Kirchheimbolanden (Note: German: [ˌkɪʁçhaɪmboˈlandn̩] or [-ˈboːlandn̩]) is the capital and the second largest city of the Donnersbergkreis, in Rhineland-Palatinate. Situated in south-western Germany, it is approximately 25 km west of Worms, and 30 km north-east of Kaiserslautern.

The first part of the name, Kirchheim, dates back to 774. It became a town in 1368, and the Sponheim family improved its security with many towers and walls. William, Duke of Nassau, ancestor of the royal families of Belgium, Sweden, Denmark and Norway, and of the grand-ducal family of Luxembourg, was born in Kirchheimbolanden. It was also ruled by the First French Empire between 1792 and 1814, before passing to the Kingdom of Bavaria in 1815. It was a rural district centre in the Rheinkreis, which was renamed Pfalz (Palatinate) in 1835.

== Etymology ==
The name Kirchheim was first mentioned in the Lorsch codex on 28 December 774, which can be traced back to the 7th century, where a parish church stood in present-day Kirchheimbolanden named St. Remigius. (Note: Confirmed to have remained standing until at least 1570, named after Saint Remigius.) The term Kirch is derived from the Old High German word for "church," while the suffix -heim was commonly used during the Frankish colonisation to denote a "home" or "settlement". After Kirchheimbolanden gained town privileges in 1368, it was first mentioned as Kirchheim bei Bolanden in 1370, owing its name to the Lords of Bolanden.

== History ==
=== Middle ages ===
The place Kirchheim was first mentioned in 774, later it belonged to the Lords of Bolanden.

It is mentioned in the Wormser wall-building ordinance from around 900 as one of the places that shared responsibility for maintaining the city wall of Worms. At the end of the 13th century, Kirchheim was inherited by the Sponheim branch line Bolanden-Dannenfels. Count Heinrich II. Von Sponheim-Bolanden raised the village to a town in 1368 and made it his residence. Via his granddaughter Anna von Hohenlohe († 1410) and her husband Philipp I, Count of Nassau-Weilburg, Kirchheimbolanden and the entire Sponheim-Bolander family property finally fell to the Nassau House, which owned it until the end of the feudal period.

=== Early modern age ===
Charles August, Prince of Nassau-Weilburg moved his residence from Weilburg to Kirchheim in 1737. Charles Christian, Prince of Nassau-Weilburg temporarily owned his own infantry regiment (1755–1759) in Mannheim with the Elector of the Electoral Palatinate and was temporarily general of the Netherlands, where he was governor. Frederick William, Prince of Nassau-Weilburg (1788–1816) left the city in 1793 because of the French Revolution and went to Bayreuth. This ended the time as the royal seat for Kirchheimbolanden, then only called Kirchheim.

It experienced its greatest heyday under Prince Charles August (1719–1753) and especially under Carl Christian (1753–1788) of the House of Nassau-Weilburg and his wife Princess Carolina of Orange-Nassau.

=== From the 19th century ===
After 1792, French revolutionary troops occupied the region and after the Treaty of Campo Formio (1797), annexed the left bank of the Rhine. From 1798 to 1814, Kirchheim belonged to the French department of Donnersberg and was the main town (chef-lieu) of the canton of the same name.

Due to the agreements made at the Congress of Vienna (1815) and an exchange contract with Austria, the region became part of the Kingdom of Bavaria in 1816. From 1818, Kirchheim was the seat of a land commissioner in the Bavarian Rhine circle.

When the Rhenish Hessian Legion hurriedly evacuated Kirchheim from a Prussian overwhelming power during the Palatinate uprising on 14 June 1849, Palatine militants remained in the palace garden without notification. In the battle of Kirchheimbolanden in the presence of the Prince of Prussia, 17 militants were killed.

From 1939, the place was part of and administrative seat of the district of the same name. After the Second World War, Kirchheimbolanden became part of the then newly formed state of Rhineland-Palatinate, within the French occupation zone. In the course of the first Rhineland-Palatinate administrative reform, the city moved in 1969 to the newly formed Donnersbergkreis and its seat; three years later, Kirchheimbolanden was incorporated into the also newly created community of the same name.

== Geography ==
=== Location ===
Kirchheimbolanden lies in the Palatinate at the transition point of the Nordpfälzer Bergland to the Alzeyer Hügelland bordering to the east. The city centre is located about four kilometres (as the crow flies) northeast of Donnersberg on the slope of Wartberg, also known as Schillerhain. The Leiselsbach, a left tributary of the Pfrimm, rises in the urban area. The lowest point lies at 229 m above sea level, the highest at 496 m above sea level.

=== Elevation ===
The highest point of the district is the summit of the 502 meter high Eichelberg in the far west, further east the 430.7 meter high Kuhkopf extends. The development is on the slope of the Wartberg, alternatively called Schillerhain. In the northwest of the district rises the 399.7 meter high Albertskreuz and northwest of the settlement area the 354.1 meter high Steinkopf. The Hungerberg range of hills, up to 302 meters high, is located in the southeast.

=== Urban division ===
Kirchheimbolanden is divided into the city centre with the district Haide and the districts Ambach, Bolanderhof, Edenbornerhof, Hessenhütte, Neuhof, Rothenkircherhof and Schillerhain Further places of residence are railway station 2262, Brunnenberg, brickworks Ebert, Kohlhütte and Ziegelhütte.

== Politics ==
The city council in Kirchheimbolanden consists of 24 council members, who were elected in a personalized proportional representation in the local elections on 26 May 2019, and the honorary city mayor as chairman.

The distribution of seats in the city council are:

Election	SPD	CDU	GRÜNE	FDP	LINKE	FWG	Wir für Kibo	Total
2019	5	8	4	1	–	4	2	24 Seats
2014	8	9	2	1	–	3	1	24 Seats
2009	7	9	3	1	1	3	–	24 Seats
2004	6	11	2	1	–	4	–	24 Seats

- FWG = Free Voters City of Kirchheimbolanden e. V. (formerly voter group Schauß)

In 2019, the town gained international attention after Lisel Heise, a 100-year old former physical education teacher, ran for the local council and was elected.

=== City Mayor ===
The previous mayors of Kirchheimbolanden:

Term of office	Name	Party
1905–1907	Ulrich Brunck	NLP
1907–1920	Georg Lang	Unknown
1920–1922	Reinhard Chormann	Unknown
1922–1924	Valentin Kircher	Unknown
1924–1929	Wilhelm Butz	Unknown
1929–1933	Ernst Krieger	SPD
1933–1934	Otto Zink	NSDAP
1935–1945	Albrecht Knieriemen	NSDAP
1945–1946	Ferdinand Schardt	SPD
1946–1956	Karl Fittler	SPD
1956–1960	Hermann Frambach	SPD
1960–1961	Hans Schabler	WGR
1961–1971	Friedrich Bettenhausen	SPD
1971–1972	Eugen Zänger	WGR
1972–1974	Edmund Reichert	CDU
1974–1999	Lothar Sießl	SPD
1999–2019	Klaus Hartmüller	CDU
since 2019	Marc Muchow	CDU

=== Coat of arms ===
Coat of arms of Kirchheimbolanden

Blazon: "Divided; at the top of silver and black sheathed in three rows, at the bottom in green a black boar striding to the right."

Justification of the coat of arms: The coat of arms was awarded by King Ludwig I of Bavaria on 30 January 1844, and was last confirmed on 18 June 1976 by the district government, Neustadt an der Weinstrasse. It comes from a city seal from the 14th century. The chess (actually blue and gold) comes from the coat of arms of Count Heinrich II. Von Sponheim-Bolanden (Grafschaft Sponheim), who in 1368 obtained town rights from Emperor Charles IV in 1368. The boar is reminiscent of the Counts of Eberstein, former masters of Stauf Castle, who temporarily held local authority.

=== Twin towns and sister cities ===
- Municipality Ritten, South Tyrol, Italy, since 22 April 1966
- Louhans, Saône-et-Loire, France, since 17 October 1976 (A gift from the city is a stone pig (wild boar) from the coat of arms of Kirchheimbolanden which stands in front of the town hall.)
- Friendship treaty with Chernyakhovsk, Russia, Kaliningrad region, since 2 March 2002

== Climate ==
Kirchheimbolanden has a moderate climate. It is classified as a "Cfb" (Marine West Coast Climate/Oceanic climate) by the Köppen Climate Classification system.

Climate data for Kirchheimbolanden
Month	Jan	Feb	Mar	Apr	May	Jun	Jul	Aug	Sep	Oct	Nov	Dec	Year
Mean daily maximum °C (°F)	4 (39)	6 (43)	10 (50)	14 (57)	18 (64)	21 (70)	23 (73)	24 (75)	20 (68)	15 (59)	9 (48)	5 (41)	14 (57)
Mean daily minimum °C (°F)	−1 (30)	0 (32)	2 (36)	4 (39)	8 (46)	11 (52)	13 (55)	13 (55)	10 (50)	6 (43)	3 (37)	0 (32)	6 (42)
Average precipitation mm (inches)	32 (1.3)	32 (1.3)	41 (1.6)	41 (1.6)	58 (2.3)	55 (2.2)	56 (2.2)	51 (2.0)	41 (1.6)	42 (1.7)	40 (1.6)	45 (1.8)	534 (21.2)
Average precipitation days	13	12.6	13.3	12.4	14.6	14.8	15	13	10.8	12	12.7	14.9	159.1

== Sons and daughters of the city ==
=== Year up to 1900 ===
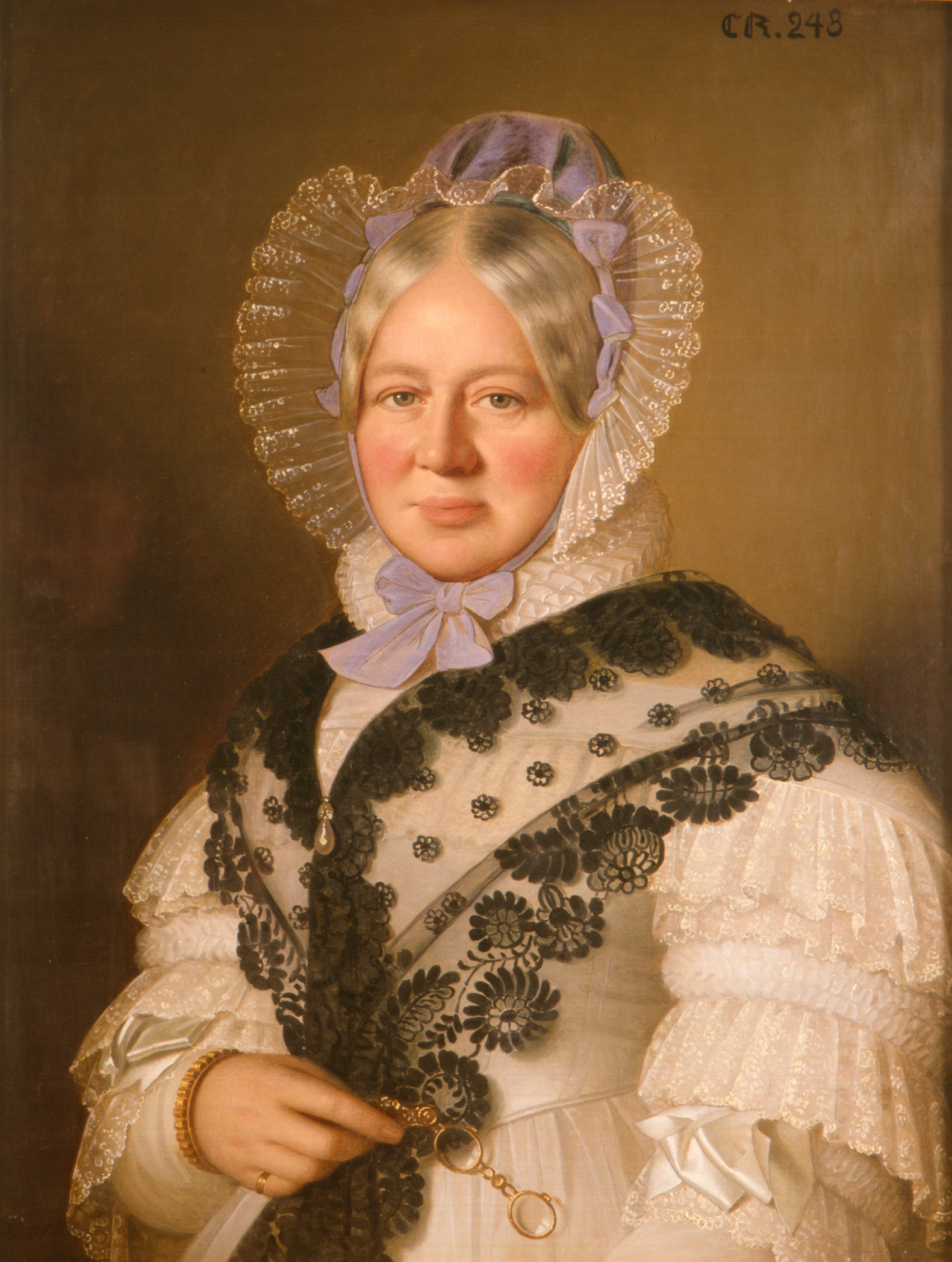
Princess Henriette of Nassau-Weilburg

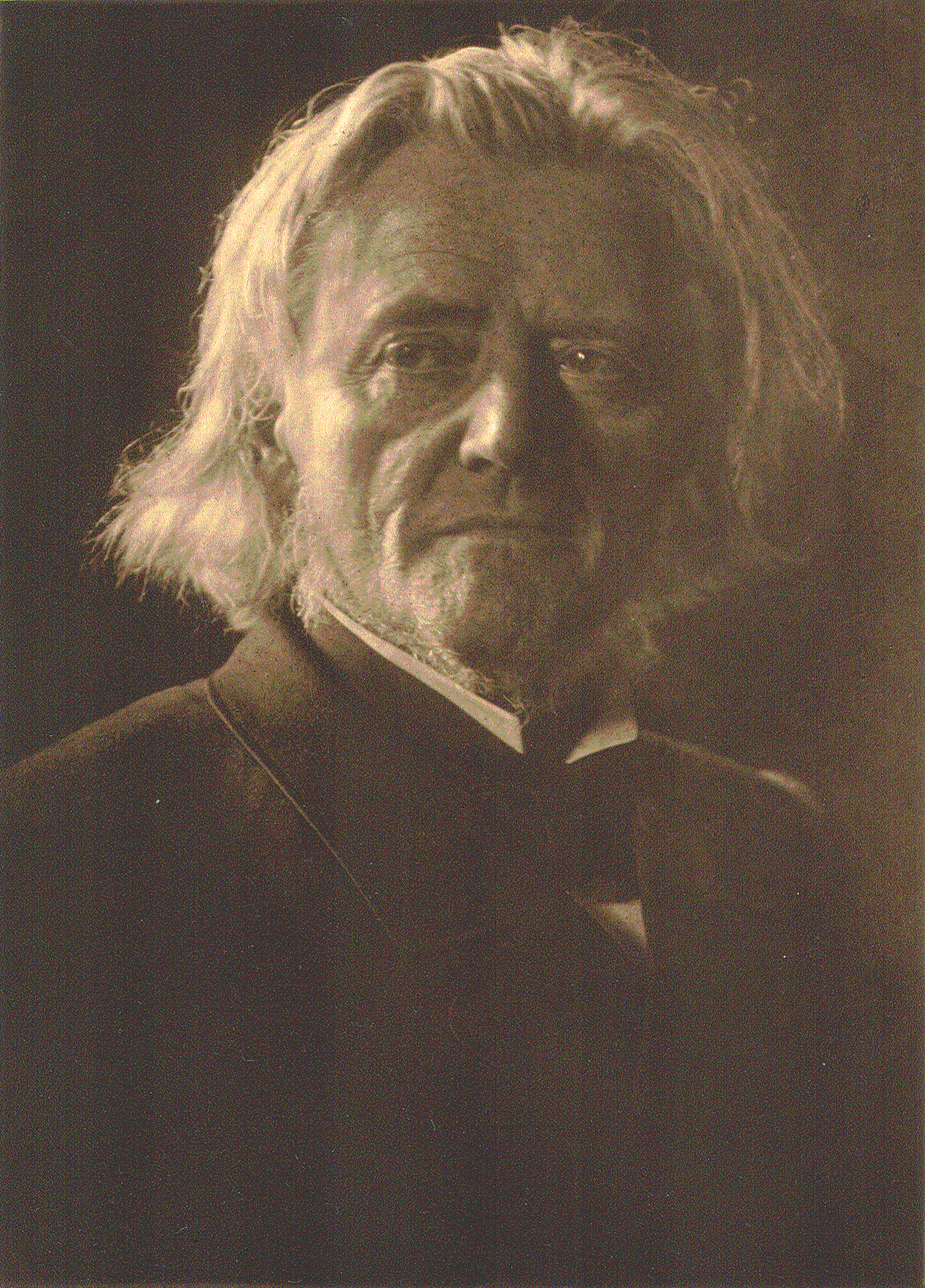
Georg von Neumayer 1905

- Johann II of Nassau-Saarbrücken (1423–1472), nobleman
- Amelia of Nassau-Weilburg (1776–1841), Princess of Anhalt-Bernburg
- Princess Henriette of Nassau-Weilburg (1780–1857), noblewoman
- Wilhelm, Duke of Nassau (1792–1839), Duke of Nassau from 1816 to 1839
- Georg von Neumayer (1826–1909), geophysicist and polar explorer, founder and leader of the German naval reserve .
- Eugen Wolf (1850–1912), journalist and researcher

=== 20th century ===
- Vanessa Neumann (*1990), racing driver and model
- David Hoffmann (*1980), bodybuilder
- Sascha Kotysch (*1988), soccer player
- Max Roser, economist and media critic

== Gallery ==
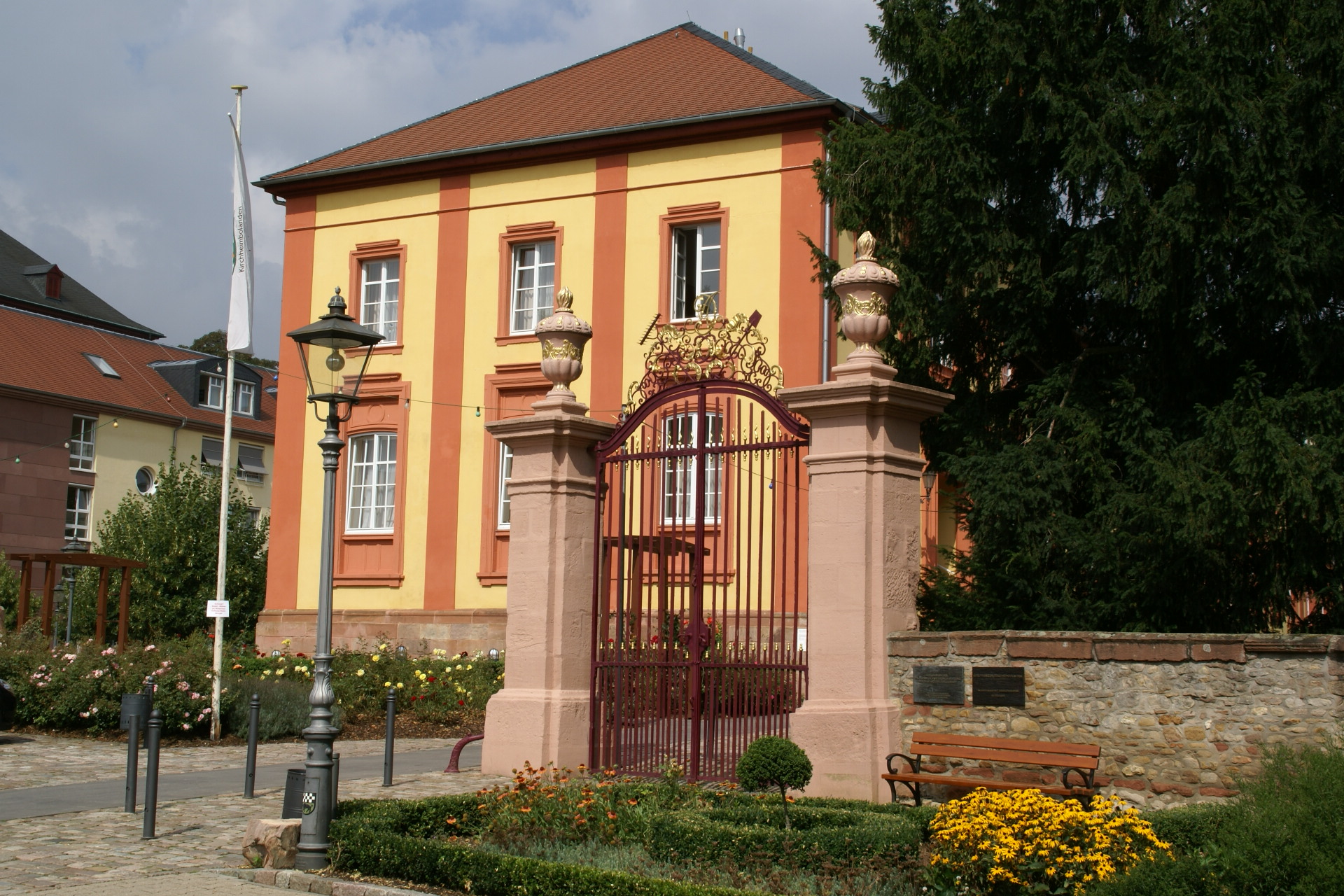
Schloss Kirchheimbolanden

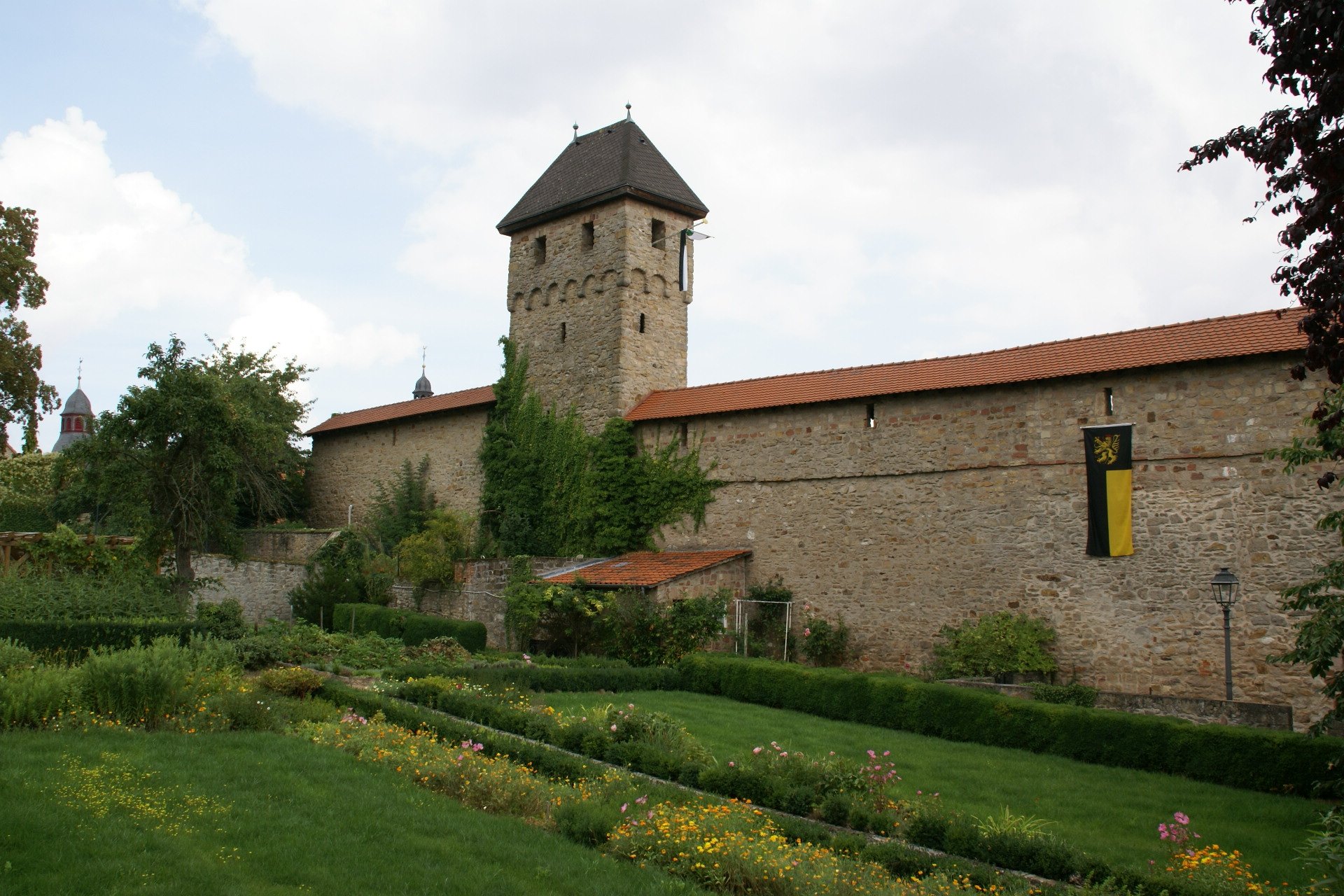
Grey tower

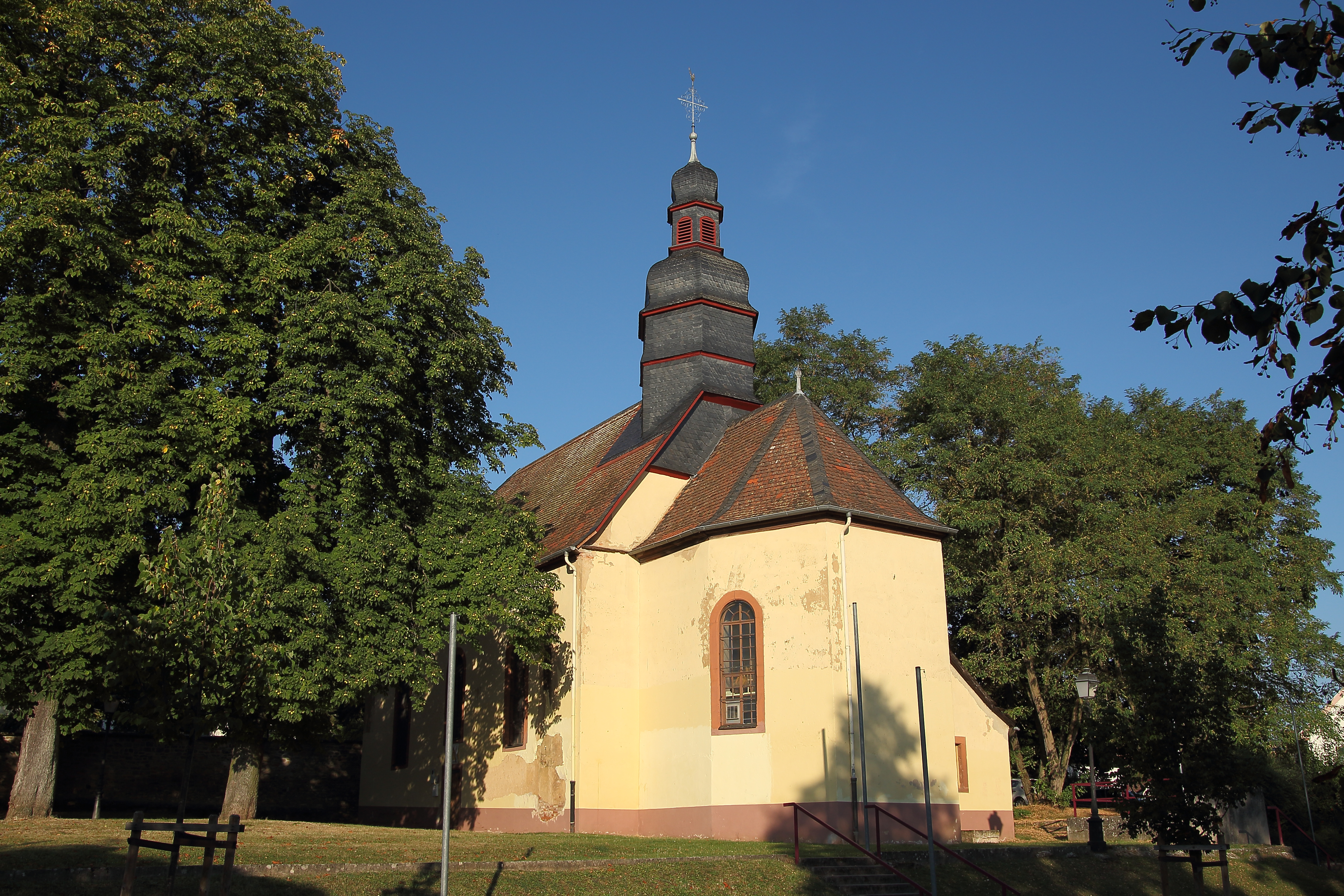
Liebfrauenkirche

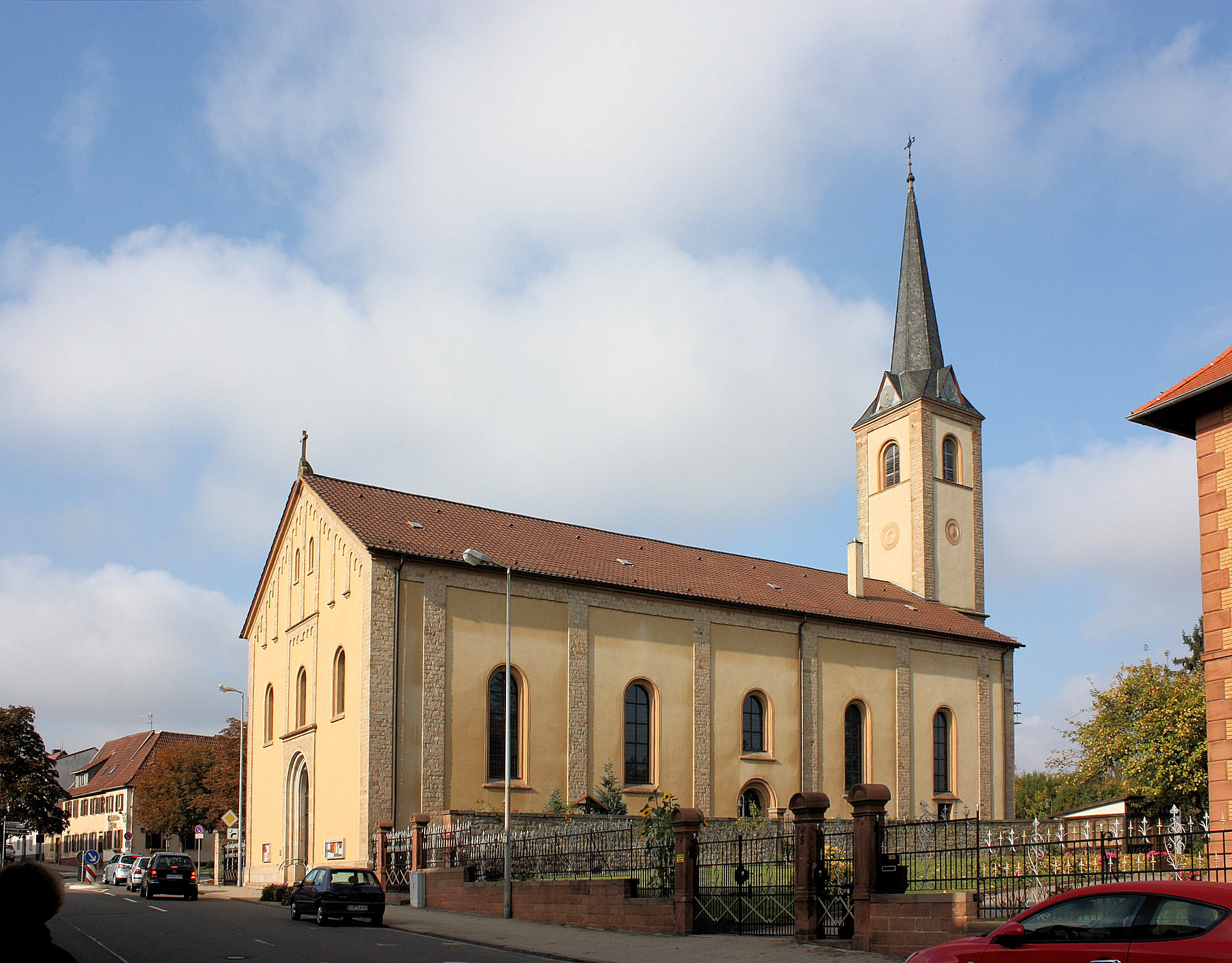
St. Peter‘s catholic church

== See also ==
- Verbandsgemeinde Kirchheimbolanden
- Rhineland-Palatinate

== Works cited ==
- Döhn, Hans (1968). Kirchheimbolanden. Die Geschichte der Stadt. Kirchheimbolanden: City of Kirchheimbolanden.
- Lehna, Britta (1992). Kirchheimbolanden. Die Geschichte der Stadt. Band II. Kirchheimbolanden: City of Kirchheimbolanden.
