= Wahlheim =

- Municipality
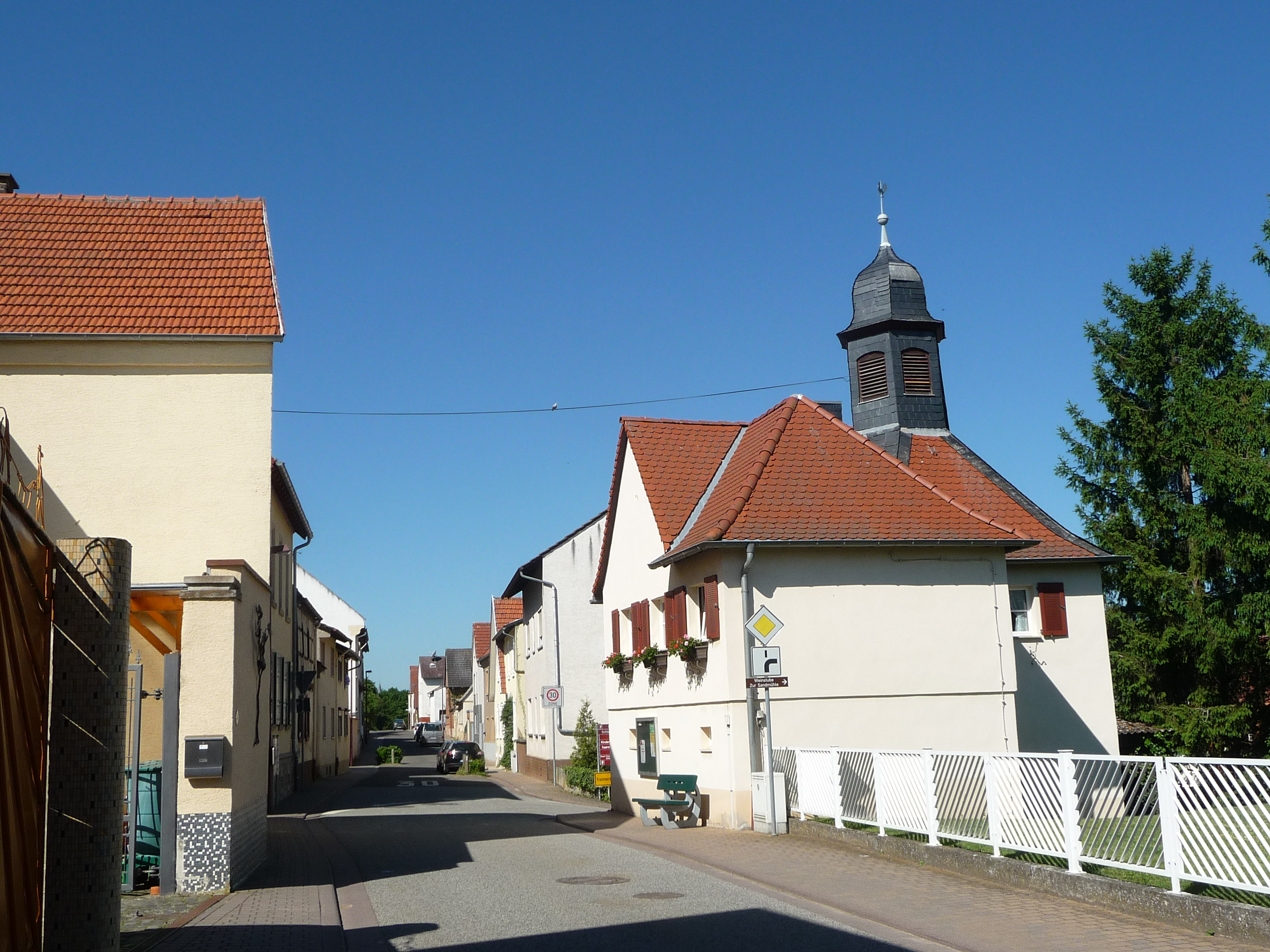

- Coat of arms

- Location of Wahlheim within Alzey-Worms district
- Interactive map of Wahlheim
- Location within Germany Location within Rhineland-Palatinate
- Coordinates: 49°43′4″N 8°6′22″E
- Country: Germany
- State: Rhineland-Palatinate
- District: Alzey-Worms
- Municipal assoc.: Alzey-Land

Government
  - Mayor (2019–24): Ralph Fuchs

Area
  - Total: 3.26 km^{2} (1.26 sq mi)
- Elevation: 241 m (791 ft)

Population (2025-12-31)
  - Total: 574
  - Density: 176/km^{2} (456/sq mi)
- Time zone: UTC+01:00 (CET)
  - Summer (DST): UTC+02:00 (CEST)
- Postal codes: 55234
- Dialling codes: 06731
- Vehicle registration: AZ

Wahlheim (German pronunciation: [ˈvaːlhaɪm]) is an Ortsgemeinde – a municipality belonging to a Verbandsgemeinde, a kind of collective municipality – in the Alzey-Worms district in Rhineland-Palatinate, Germany. It has 587 inhabitants and an area of 3.27 km^{2} (1.26 sq mi).

== Geography ==
=== Location ===
The municipality lies in Rhenish Hesse and belongs to the Verbandsgemeinde of Alzey-Land, whose seat is in Alzey.

Flowing through Wahlheim is the river Aufspringbach, known further downstream as the river Weidas. Wahlheim is the centre of the kühler Grund (“Cool Ground”).

=== Neighbouring municipalities ===
Wahlheim's neighbours are Esselborn, Freimersheim and Kettenheim.

== History ==
The village of Wahlheim in the Kettenheimer Grund, once known as Walaheim, belonged to Castle Alzey. In 1400, Count Palatine Ruprecht III bought two parts of the village and municipal area from the Burgmann Heinrich Bock von Lonsheim. From 1633, the village belonged to the Electorate of the Palatinate. In the municipal area, an estate of the Waida Monastery was discovered near Dautenheim. The 20-piped fountain, called the Brückenbrunnen, that once stood between the two constituent communities was removed.

== Politics ==
=== Municipal council ===
The council is made up of 12 members, who were elected by majority vote at the municipal election held on 9 June 2024, and the honorary mayor as chairman.

=== Coat of arms ===
The German blazon reads thus: In Silber auf grünem Dreiberg zwei grüne Ähren schrägrechts und -links gelegt, bewinkelt von drei roten Mohnkapseln.

The municipality's arms might in English heraldic language be described thus: Argent, in base a mount of three vert issuant from the top of which two ears of wheat, one bendwise, the other bendwise sinister of the same, between three poppy bolls palewise slipped gules, one and two.

These arms appear on the municipality's own website. Heraldry of the World, however, shows slightly different arms, with the same charges, but with the ears’ and bolls’ tinctures transposed.

== Economy and infrastructure ==
=== Winemaking ===
- Schelmen, part of the Großlage (winemaking appellation) of Sybillenstein, has 131 ha (320 acres) of vineyards.
