= Weidas =

River in Germany

Location
- Country: Germany
- State: Rhineland-Palatinate
- Region: Rhenish Hesse
- Reference no.: DE: 2522

Physical characteristics
- Source
  - location: Near Ilbesheim
  - coordinates: 49°41′35″N 8°05′12″E
  - elevation: 282 m above sea level (NHN)
- Mouth
  - location: Near Framersheim into the Selz
  - coordinates: 49°45′33″N 8°10′01″E
  - elevation: 151 m above sea level (NHN)
- Length: 11.072 km (6.880 mi)
- Basin size: 36.81 km^{2} (14.21 sq mi)

Basin features
- Progression: Selz→ Rhine→ North Sea
- River system: Rhine

The Weidas, also called the Weidasserbach, is a roughly eleven-kilometre-long, orographically right-hand tributary of the Selz in the German region of Rhenish Hesse.

== Course ==
The Weidas rises near Freimersheim and empties into the Rhine tributary of the Selz near Framersheim from the southwest. From its source to Dautenheim (a district of Alzey) it is also called the Aufspringbach. It flows in sequence through Wahlheim, Kettenheim, Dautenheim and Gau-Heppenheim.

== Tributaries ==
- Aufspring (left), south of Freimersheim, 0.7 km (0.43 mi)
- Freimersheimer Bach (Flutgraben) (left), north of Freimersheim, 0.8 km (0.50 mi)
- Esselborn (Esselborner Bach) (right), near the Hessensteigermühle mill, 2.1 km (1.3 mi)
- Gau-Heppenheimerbach (right), northeast of the Mohrenmühle mill, 1.8 km (1.1 mi)

== See also ==
- List of rivers of Rhineland-Palatinate
