= Lonsheim =

- Municipality
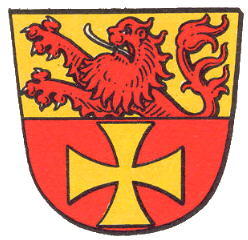
- Coat of arms

- Location of Lonsheim within Alzey-Worms district
- Interactive map of Lonsheim
- Location within Germany Location within Rhineland-Palatinate
- Coordinates: 49°46′43″N 08°04′36″E
- Country: Germany
- State: Rhineland-Palatinate
- District: Alzey-Worms
- Municipal assoc.: Alzey-Land

Government
  - Mayor (2019–24): Harald Denne

Area
  - Total: 4.56 km^{2} (1.76 sq mi)
- Elevation: 238 m (781 ft)

Population (2025-12-31)
  - Total: 582
  - Density: 128/km^{2} (331/sq mi)
- Time zone: UTC+01:00 (CET)
  - Summer (DST): UTC+02:00 (CEST)
- Postal codes: 55237
- Dialling codes: 06734
- Vehicle registration: AZ

Lonsheim is an Ortsgemeinde – a municipality belonging to a Verbandsgemeinde, a kind of collective municipality – in the Alzey-Worms district in Rhineland-Palatinate, Germany.

== Geography ==
=== Location ===
The municipality lies in Rhenish Hesse and belongs to the Verbandsgemeinde of Alzey-Land, whose seat is in Alzey. The small, rural, agricultural, winegrowing centre lies in a hollow at the foot of the wooded “Hemm” and has vineyards on all sides. It is in what is known as the Rhenish-Hessian Switzerland (Rheinhessische Schweiz).

On a clear day, one can see from Lonsheim all the way to Frankfurt am Main.

==== Wineries ====
Lonsheim has the Mandelberg and Schönberg wineries, which are part of the winemaking appellation – Weingroßlage – of Adelberg. All together, vineyards cover 139 ha.

=== Neighbouring municipalities ===
Lonsheim’s neighbours are Bornheim, Bermersheim vor der Höhe and Heimersheim (an outlying centre of Alzey).

== History ==
The village was in the beginning held by the Waldgraves of Kyrburg. Until 1398, the family Bock von Lonsheim held it as a fief, and thereafter so did other noble families (at Albig and Heppenheim) until it passed to the Electorate of the Palatinate in 1679.

== Politics ==
=== Municipal council ===
The council is made up of 12 council members, who were elected by majority vote at the municipal election held on 7 June 2009, and the honorary mayor as chairman.

=== Coat of arms ===
The municipality’s arms might be described thus: Per fess Or a demi-lion rampant gules armed and langued argent, and gules a cross pattée of the first.

== Culture and sightseeing ==
=== Sport ===
The local sport club, TV Lonsheim e.V., founded in 1888, began a history of successes in the 1990s. The club’s greatest success was rising to the Verbandsliga, where opponents such as Waldalgesheim and Ingelheim await.

Not only are the footballers masters of their craft, but the TVL’s gymnasts, too, regularly take part successfully in meets. Unlike the football section, the gymnastics section has been in existence since the club’s founding in 1888; the football section was officially founded only in the mid-1980s, with the club name FC Aussichtsturm Lonsheim (Aussichtsturm means “lookout tower”). A year later it took the name TV Lonsheim.
