= Nack =

- Municipality
- Coat of arms

- Location of Nack within Alzey-Worms district
- Interactive map of Nack
- Location within Germany Location within Rhineland-Palatinate
- Coordinates: 49°44′47″N 8°1′40″E
- Country: Germany
- State: Rhineland-Palatinate
- District: Alzey-Worms
- Municipal assoc.: Alzey-Land

Government
  - Mayor (2019–24): Frank Jakoby-Marouelli

Area
  - Total: 5.56 km^{2} (2.15 sq mi)
- Elevation: 292 m (958 ft)

Population (2025-12-31)
  - Total: 567
  - Density: 102/km^{2} (264/sq mi)
- Time zone: UTC+01:00 (CET)
  - Summer (DST): UTC+02:00 (CEST)
- Postal codes: 55234
- Dialling codes: 06736
- Vehicle registration: AZ
- Website: www.ortsgemeinde-nack.de

Nack (German pronunciation: [nak]) is an Ortsgemeinde – a municipality belonging to a Verbandsgemeinde, a kind of collective municipality – in the Alzey-Worms district in Rhineland-Palatinate, Germany.

== Geography ==
=== Location ===
The municipality lies in Rhenish Hesse and belongs to the Verbandsgemeinde of Alzey-Land, whose seat is in Alzey.

=== Neighbouring municipalities ===
Nack's neighbours are Erbes-Büdesheim, Bechenheim, Nieder-Wiesen, Offenheim und Wendelsheim.

== History ==
=== Religion ===
By religious affiliation, the greatest part of Nack's population, 44.8%, belongs to the Evangelical denomination, whereas 34.2% of the population is Catholic. Those professing another religious affiliation, or none, amount to 21%.

=== Population development ===
At 31 December 2004, there were precisely 631 registered inhabitants whose main residences were in Nack, and another 31 inhabitants with secondary residences in the municipality (according to data from the municipal statistics from the Verbandsgemeinde of Alzey-Land), making Nack rather one of the smaller villages in the Verbandsgemeinde, with its population of 24,362. Nevertheless, of the 24 places in the Verbandsgemeinde, 11 have even smaller populations than Nack.

As the following table shows, over the last 30 years, there has been a rise in Nack's population of roughly 17%.

Date	Inhabitants
31 Dec. 1975	541
31 Dec. 1981	553
31 Dec. 1985	506
31 Dec. 1996	580
31 Dec. 2001	629
31 Dec. 2004	631
31 Dec. 2005	628

The climb in population figures over the last few years stems from the development of the new building areas, In den Dreißig Morgen (1990) and Am Wingertsberg (1995). A further such area is foreseen: Procedures for transferring the land needed for the building area Am Sportplatz have been completed, and thereby the number of building lots on offer is to be raised by 15.

The age distribution in Nack is much the same as it is throughout Germany. The younger age groups are represented in noticeably lower figures. The biggest group, among both men and women, is the 40-to-49 age group. This also holds true in age group breakdowns for the whole of the Verbandsgemeinde of Alzey-Land).

In this municipality, 8 children each year until 2011 will begin school, which, given the figures for Nack, is no small number.

The male share of the population at 51.03% is only marginally higher than the female share at 48.97%.

== Politics ==
=== Town council ===
The council is made up of 12 council members, who were elected at the municipal election held on 7 June 2009, and the honorary mayor as chairman.

The municipal election held on 7 June 2009 yielded the following results:

	Bürgerverein	Wildner	Total
2009	8	4	12 seats

=== Mayors ===
- Erhard Grauer (until 1997)
- Paul Maruelli (1997–2004)
- Bernhard Hähnel, Bürgerverein (2004–2019)
- Frank Jakoby-Marouelli (since 2019)

=== Coat of arms ===
The municipality's arms might be described thus: Argent between two bars gules the letter N azure flanked by two cubes of the second, in chief five cubes in fess of the second, in base three cubes of the second.

According to Parker, “cubes” is correct for this charge, “square” in blazons meaning a carpenter's or mason's tool.

== Culture and sightseeing ==
=== Sport ===
Nack has at its disposal a motocross track, where once Germany-wide races were held; however, owing to difficulties due to noise in Wendelsheim, the racetrack was largely shut down. Today drivers from the local area only use the track once a month.

- Football club (TuS Nack), which plays in the Alzey district league
- Dancing club

=== Clubs ===
- Gesangverein 1845 e.V. Nack (mixed singing club)
- Bürgerverein (Citizens’ club)
- Landfrauenverein (Countrywomen's club), the oldest in Rhenish Hesse
- 1. FCK fan club
- Bulldog club (Die Bulldogfreunde)

=== Regular events ===
- Fastnachtssitzung (“Carnival session”), a fortnight before Carnival Weekend
- Mittelalter-Dorffest (“Middle Ages Village Festival”), every other year
- Volleyball tournament, every summer
- Kermis (church consecration festival, locally known as the Kerb), on the last weekend in August
- Adventsmarkt (“Advent Market”), on the Saturday before the first day of Advent
- St. Martins Umzug (parade)

== Economy and infrastructure ==
=== Public institutions ===
- Fire brigade/Youth fire brigade
