= Flomborn =

- Municipality
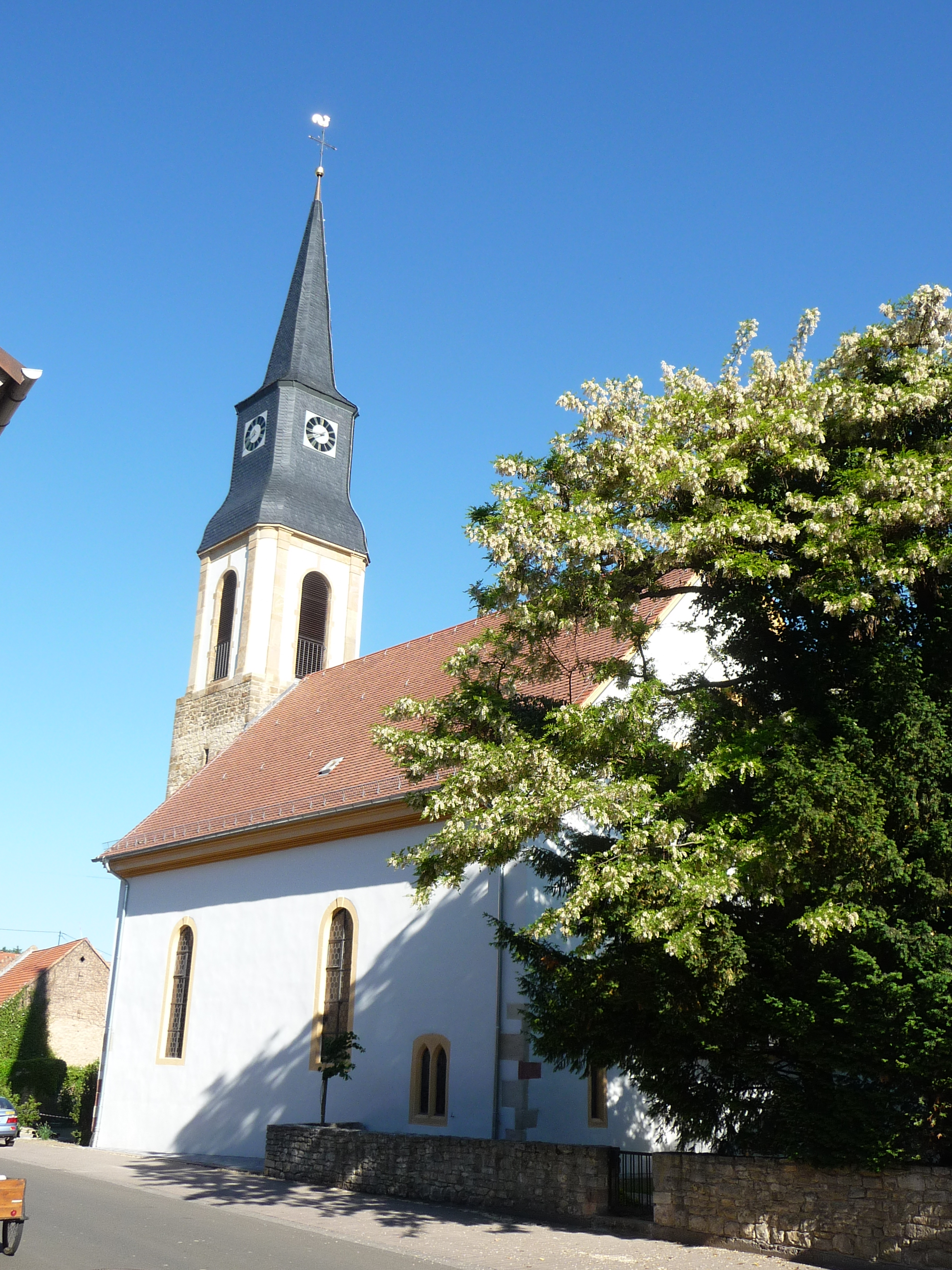
- protestant church

- Coat of arms

- Location of Flomborn within Alzey-Worms district
- Interactive map of Flomborn
- Location within Germany Location within Rhineland-Palatinate
- Coordinates: 49°41′26″N 08°08′57″E
- Country: Germany
- State: Rhineland-Palatinate
- District: Alzey-Worms
- Municipal assoc.: Alzey-Land

Government
  - Mayor (2019–24): Sabine Kröhle

Area
  - Total: 7.94 km^{2} (3.07 sq mi)
- Elevation: 250 m (820 ft)

Population (2025-12-31)
  - Total: 1,056
  - Density: 133/km^{2} (344/sq mi)
- Time zone: UTC+01:00 (CET)
  - Summer (DST): UTC+02:00 (CEST)
- Postal codes: 55234
- Dialling codes: 06735
- Vehicle registration: AZ
- Website: www.flomborn.de

Flomborn is an Ortsgemeinde – a municipality belonging to a Verbandsgemeinde, a kind of collective municipality – in the Alzey-Worms district in Rhineland-Palatinate, Germany.

== Geography ==
=== Location ===
The municipality lies in Rhenish Hesse, in the Rheinhessisches Hügelland (Rhenish-Hessian Uplands), and in the Wormsgau. It belongs to the Verbandsgemeinde of Alzey-Land, whose seat is in Alzey.

=== Neighbouring municipalities ===
Flomborn's neighbours are Ober-Flörsheim, Dintesheim and Eppelsheim.

== History ==
Flomborn has had many names over the ages, among which are Flamburn (1196), Blanbrunnen (1283), Flomburna (1324), Flonborne (1336), Flanborn (1362), Flamborn (1406), Flanbronnen (1424), Floborn (1509) and Flonborn (1787).

In its earliest days, the place belonged to the Bishopric of Mainz, with several churches, monasteries and noblemen holding estates there. Of the last, one noble family even bore the village's name. One Rudewin von Flamburn crops up in the historical record as early as 1208, his name appearing in a document. The name Bruno von Flamburn was borne by one of the Ganerben – the joint rulers of the area – who granted the Marienborn Monastery at Weidas near Dautenheim the church rights at Gau-Heppenheim, and another Rudewin von Flamburn was named in 1295 as the arbiter of the Offenheim church rights for the Winter von Alzey family. A Berthold von Flamburn and his wife Christine were enfeoffed by the Archbishop Baldwin of Luxembourg of Trier, who then was the administrator of the Archiepiscopal Foundation of Mainz, with their estate, house and garden in the village of Flamborn in 1335 for 100 pounds in Hellers for a castle fief in Biebelnheim. It is likely that this old family also held the Vogtei in the village as a fief from the Bishopric of Worms. A Berthold von Flamburn and a Philipp von Gauwer held the office of Schultheiß, with the right to name a marksman, as a fief from the Bishopric of Worms, which Berthold's son, Siegfried, and Gauwer had already received by 1406. In the same century, this fief passed to the family von Rodenstein and in 1483, Hans von Rodenstein was enfeoffed with the village of Flamborn, the estate and other holdings formerly held by Bishop Johann of Worms.

As early as 1378 a man named Rucker from Eppelsheim received ten Malter (roughly 1 280 L) of woodland corn from Count Palatine Ruprecht the Elder as a fief. Furthermore, in a document from 1424, Count Palatine Ludwig explicitly calls Flomborn “our” village. In the 16th century, the whole village was in Electoral Palatinate’s ownership. It belonged to the Oberamt of Alzey until the French occupation in the late 18th century.

== Politics ==
=== Municipal council ===
The council is made up of 16 council members, who were elected by proportional representation at the municipal election held on 7 June 2009, and the honorary mayor as chairman, with seats apportioned thus:

Für Flomborn: 10 seats Willig: 6 seats

Both these factions are free voter groups.

=== Coat of arms ===
The municipality’s arms might be described thus: Per fess wavy vert a fish argent and argent a twig fesswise of the first lopped in dexter and couped in sinister with three leaves, the dexter to chief dexter, the sinister to chief sinister, and the middle to base.

The municipality’s own webpage, however, shows a slightly different coat of arms, with the fish’s fins in the tincture Or (gold).

== Culture and sightseeing ==
=== Monuments ===
==== Bronze pig ====
This monument was erected to the village’s leanest pig.

Flomborners deemed the fees on livestock for slaughter raised by the Occupiers after the Second World War much too high. These fees were assessed by the stock’s living weight. When the swine were gathered for weighing, the villagers led the same pig each time to the scale, to the point at which the pig was more or less performing the procedure by itself. This led to the fee coming out rather lower than it would otherwise have been, for this pig was the leanest, lightest one in the whole village. Those doing the weighing supposedly noticed nothing amiss and the villagers were so cheered that they later decided to put up a monument to this pig.

A well known song in the village, sung at Carnival (locally known as Fastnachtzeit), tells of this story:

German	English translation
Und will mal einer schlachten, da gibt es ein groß´ Malör, wo nehm ich nur ein Schweinchen her, meins ist doch viel zu schwer. Und heimlich borgt sich jeder dieselbe mag're Sau, die rennt schon ganz allein zur Waag' und macht auch kein Radau.	And should one wish to slaughter, therein lies great misfortune, Where I only take a little pig, Mine is just much too heavy. And secretly each one borrows the same lean sow, That already runs alone to the scale and also makes no row.

=== Archaeology ===
Flomborn is eponymous for a ceramic and cultural stage in the Early New Stone Age, part of the Linear Pottery culture.

=== Education ===
- Flomborn primary school and Hauptschule

== Sport ==
=== TuS Flomborn ===
The Turn- und Sportverein 1897 e.V. Flomborn (gymnastic and sport club) is the locally resident sport and football club. The founding meeting, with 58 founding members, took place on 28 July 1897.
