= Alzey-Land =

- Verbandsgemeinde
- Coat of arms

- Location of Alzey-Land within Alzey-Worms district
- Interactive map of Alzey-Land
- Location within Germany Location within Rhineland-Palatinate
- Coordinates: 49°45′N 8°07′E
- Country: Germany
- State: Rhineland-Palatinate
- District: Alzey-Worms
- Seat: Alzey
- Subdivisions: 24 municipalities

Area
  - Total: 173.87 km^{2} (67.13 sq mi)

Population (2025-12-31)
  - Total: 25,029
  - Density: 143.95/km^{2} (372.83/sq mi)
- Time zone: UTC+01:00 (CET)
  - Summer (DST): UTC+02:00 (CEST)
- Website: www.alzey-land.de

Alzey-Land is a Verbandsgemeinde ("collective municipality") in the district Alzey-Worms, Rhineland-Palatinate, Germany. It is located around the town Alzey, which is the seat of Alzey-Land, but not part of the Verbandsgemeinde.

Alzey-Land consists of the following Ortsgemeinden ("local municipalities"):

- Albig
- Bechenheim
- Bechtolsheim
- Bermersheim vor der Höhe
- Biebelnheim
- Bornheim
- Dintesheim
- Eppelsheim
- Erbes-Büdesheim
- Esselborn
- Flomborn
- Flonheim
- Framersheim
- Freimersheim
- Gau-Heppenheim
- Gau-Odernheim
- Kettenheim
- Lonsheim
- Mauchenheim
- Nack
- Nieder-Wiesen
- Ober-Flörsheim
- Offenheim
- Wahlheim

== Notable residents ==
- William Heilman, born in Albig, United States Congressman from Indiana
- Hildegard von Bingen
