= Offenheim =

- Municipality
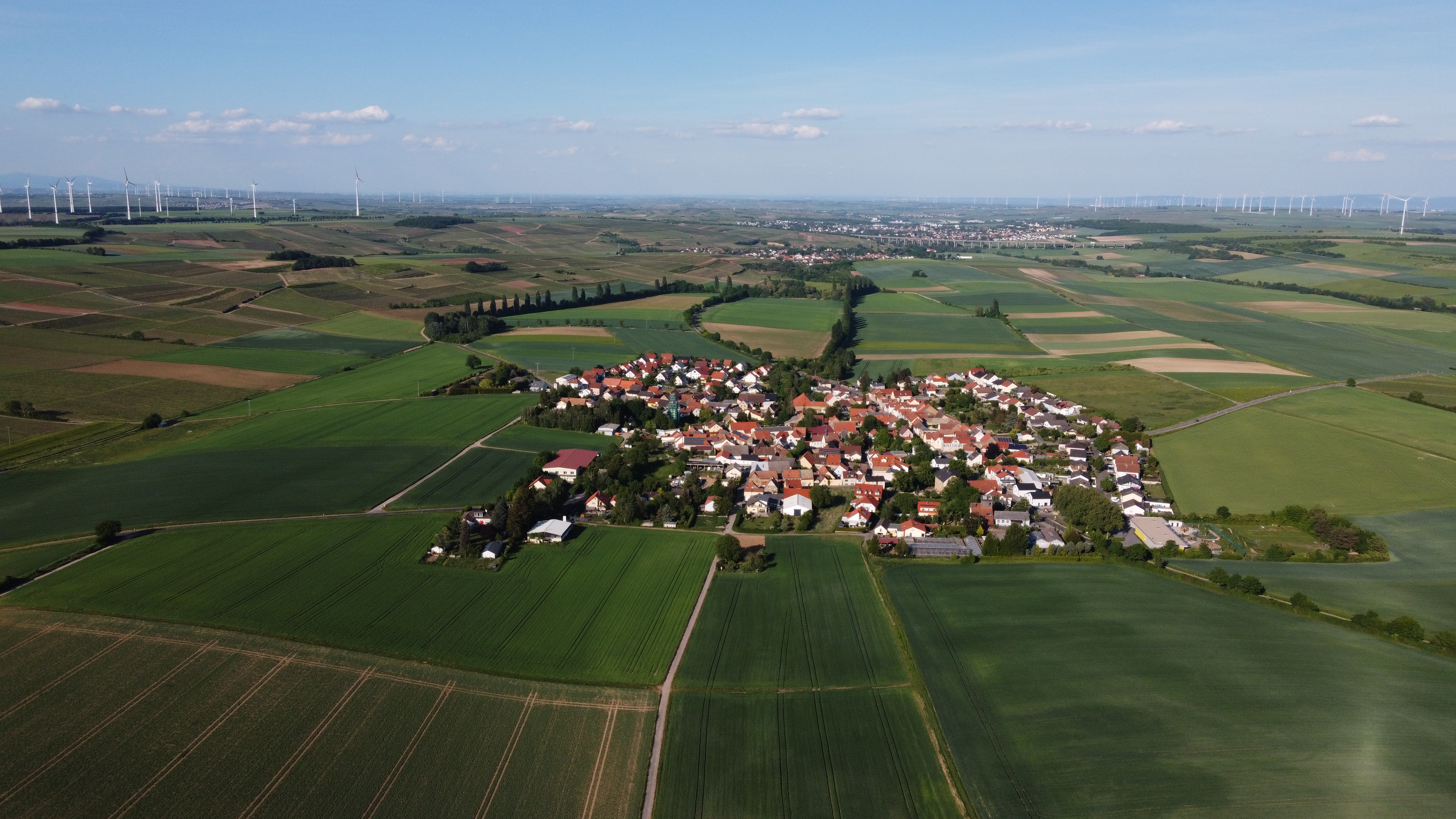
- aerial view

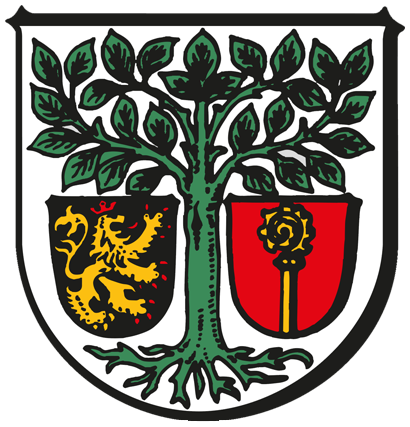
- Coat of arms

- Location of Offenheim within Alzey-Worms district
- Interactive map of Offenheim
- Location within Germany Location within Rhineland-Palatinate
- Coordinates: 49°43′32″N 08°01′49″E
- Country: Germany
- State: Rhineland-Palatinate
- District: Alzey-Worms
- Municipal assoc.: Alzey-Land

Government
  - Mayor (2019–24): Peter Odermann

Area
  - Total: 13.86 km^{2} (5.35 sq mi)
- Elevation: 229 m (751 ft)

Population (2025-12-31)
  - Total: 645
  - Density: 46.5/km^{2} (121/sq mi)
- Time zone: UTC+01:00 (CET)
  - Summer (DST): UTC+02:00 (CEST)
- Postal codes: 55234
- Dialling codes: 06736
- Vehicle registration: AZ
- Website: www.offenheim.de

Offenheim (German pronunciation: [ˈɔfn̩haɪm]) is an Ortsgemeinde – a municipality belonging to a Verbandsgemeinde, a kind of collective municipality – in the Alzey-Worms district in Rhineland-Palatinate, Germany.

== Geography ==
=== Location ===
The municipality, which lies in the middle of the Rhenish-Hessian Switzerland, has 842 ha of woodland, giving it the biggest and almost the only wooded area in Rhenish Hesse. In the Vorholzwald (forest) is found Rhenish Hesse's highest elevation at 358 m above sea level, the Kappelberg. Offenheim belongs to the Verbandsgemeinde of Alzey-Land, whose seat is in Alzey.

== History ==
In 786, Offenheim had its first documentary mention in Lorsch Abbey’s donation directory.

== Politics ==
=== Municipal council ===
The council is made up of 12 council members, who were elected at the municipal election held on 7 June 2009, and the honorary mayor as chairman.

The municipal election held on 7 June 2009 yielded the following results:

| | SPD | LINKE | BfO | FWG | Total |
| 2009 | 5 | 1 | 4 | 2 | 12 seats |
| 2004 | 4 | - | 5 | 3 | 12 seats |

=== Coat of arms ===
The municipality's arms might be described thus: Argent an oak eradicated leafed of eleven vert, fretted in the boughs a bow unstrung in fesse Or on each end of which an inescutcheon, the dexter sable in bend sinister charged with a lion rampant sinister Or langued and crowned gules, and the sinister gules in bend charged with the head of a bishop's crozier Or, the point of the crook in the shape of a trefoil in bend sinister.
