= Flonheim =

- Municipality
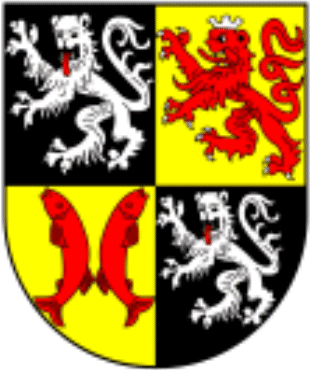
- Coat of arms

- Location of Flonheim within Alzey-Worms district
- Interactive map of Flonheim
- Location within Germany Location within Rhineland-Palatinate
- Coordinates: 49°47′6″N 8°2′24″E
- Country: Germany
- State: Rhineland-Palatinate
- District: Alzey-Worms
- Municipal assoc.: Alzey-Land
- Subdivisions: 2

Government
  - Mayor (2019–24): Ute Beiser-Hübner (SPD)

Area
  - Total: 14.95 km^{2} (5.77 sq mi)
- Elevation: 198 m (650 ft)

Population (2025-12-31)
  - Total: 2,644
  - Density: 176.9/km^{2} (458.1/sq mi)
- Time zone: UTC+01:00 (CET)
  - Summer (DST): UTC+02:00 (CEST)
- Postal codes: 55237
- Dialling codes: 06734
- Vehicle registration: AZ
- Website: www.flonheim.de

Flonheim is an Ortsgemeinde – a municipality belonging to a Verbandsgemeinde, a kind of collective municipality – in the Alzey-Worms district in Rhineland-Palatinate, Germany.

== Geography ==
=== Location ===
The municipality lies in the middle of Rhenish Hesse near the Rhine Valley. Through Flonheim flows the river Wiesbach.

=== Geology ===
In Flonheim’s municipal area is an old sandstone quarry at which, until the earlier half of the 20th century, Flonheim sandstone was quarried.

=== Climate ===
Yearly precipitation in Flonheim amounts to 532 mm, which is rather low, falling into the lowest tenth of the precipitation chart for all Germany. At 7% of the German Weather Service’s weather stations, even lower figures are recorded. The driest month is January. The most rainfall comes in June. In that month, precipitation is twice what it is in January. Precipitation hardly varies over the year. At 28% of the weather stations, lower seasonal swings are recorded.

=== Neighbouring municipalities ===
Flonheim’s neighbours are Armsheim, Bornheim, Uffhofen (since 7 June 1969 amalgamated with Flonheim) and Wendelsheim.

== History ==
As early as Roman times, sandstone was being quarried in what is now Flonheim’s municipal area. Some sculptural finds are on display at the Alzey Museum, such as a Viergötterstein (a “four-god stone”, a pedestal on which a Jupiter Column was customarily stood). There has also been a wealth of grave finds from Frankish times, especially a princely grave from the 7th century furnished with weapons.

In 764, Flonheim had its first documentary mention as Flonenheim. In 960 Flonheim was mentioned as the seat of the Emichonen (later called the Counts of Flonheim). About 1133, Waldgrave Emich II endowed an Augustinian church canonical foundation (monastery), which was dissolved in 1554. About 1300, the village was fortified. Until the French Revolution (1792) Flonheim was the seat of a comital Amt.

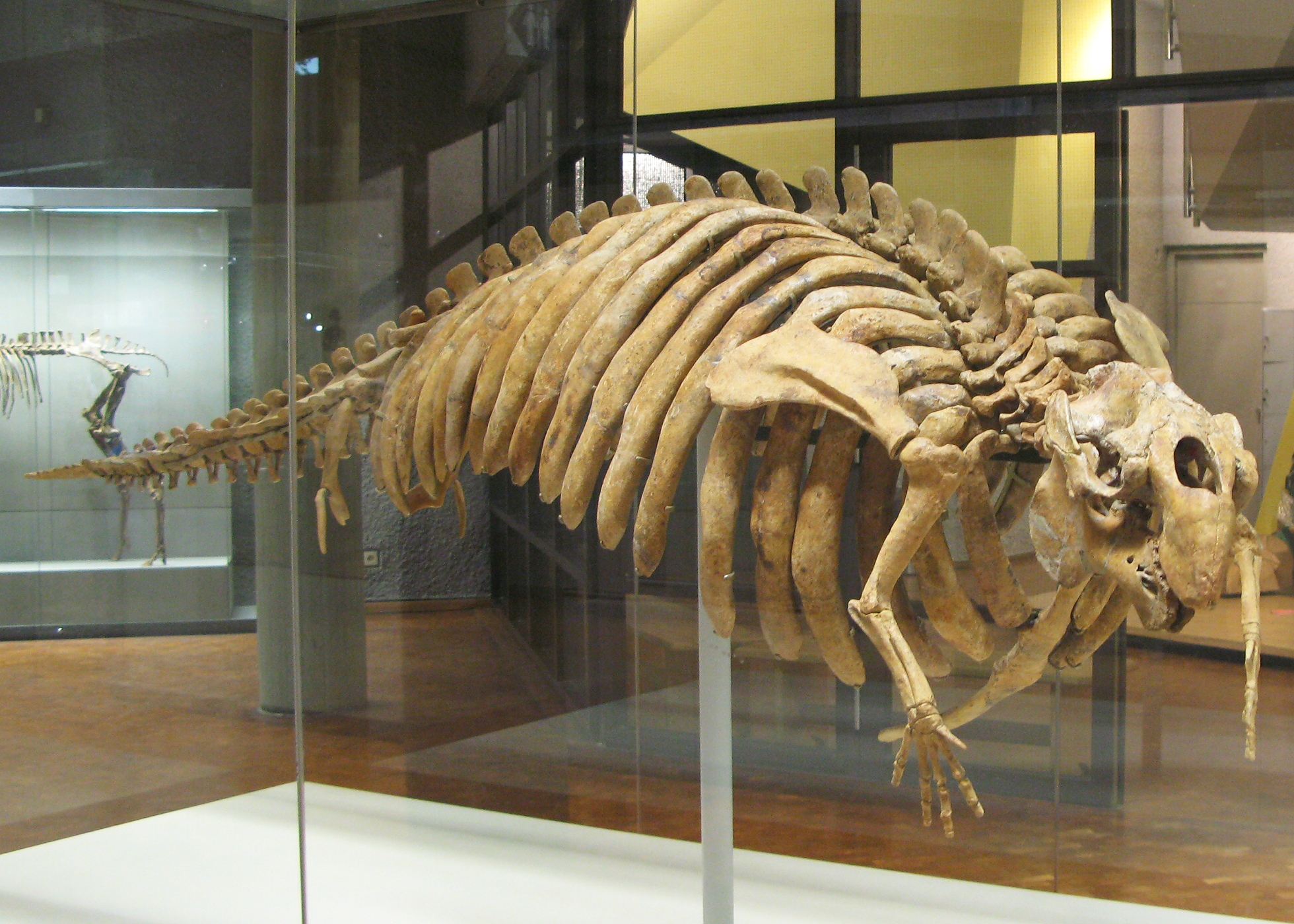
Halitherium found near Flonheim (Mainz Basin)

In Flonheim stood an early postal station on the roughly 920 km-long Habsburg postal route running from Innsbruck to Mechelen (north of Brussels), which was run by the family Taxis. It is known that the postal station was running from 1506 to about 1558.

During building work, a fossilized sea cow was unearthed in Flonheim. This is now on display at the Senckenberg Museum in Frankfurt.

=== Amalgamations ===
In the course of administrative reform, the two municipalities of Uffhofen and Flonheim were merged on 7 June 1969 into today’s municipality of Flonheim.

== Politics ==
=== Municipal council ===
The council is made up of 20 council members, who were elected at the municipal election held on 7 June 2009, and the honorary mayor as chairwoman.

The municipal election held on 7 June 2009 yielded the following results:

	SPD	CDU	FWG	Total
2009	11	4	5	20 seats
2004	11	4	5	20 seats

=== Coat of arms ===
The municipality’s arms might be described thus: Quarterly, first and fourth sable a lion rampant guardant argent langued gules, second Or a lion rampant of the third armed and crowned of the second, and third Or two fish addorsed hauriant of the third.

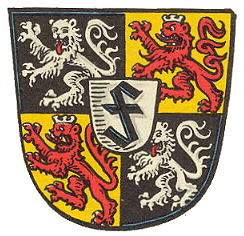
Flonheim’s old coat of arms

Uffhofen’s old coat of arms

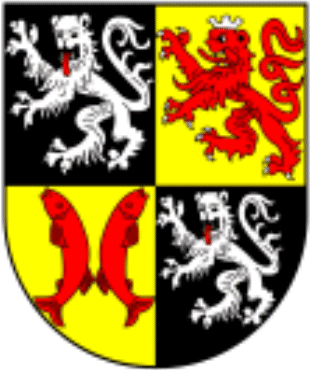
Amalgamated municipality’s coat of arms

=== Town partnerships ===
- Villenauxe-la-Grande, Aube, France
- (Germany) Schwepnitz, Saxony

== Culture and sightseeing ==
=== Cinema ===
In Flonheim is one of Germany’s oldest cinemas (1923), and until his death, Flonheim also had Germany’s oldest projectionist, Hans Frank (1915-2008).

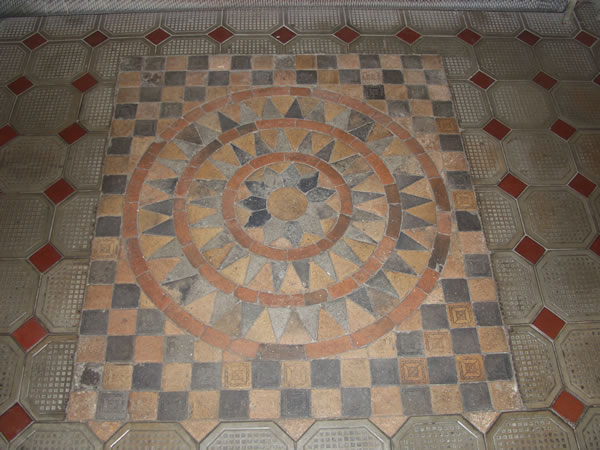
Flooring (13th century) from the former monastery church

=== Buildings ===
- The Evangelical parish church was built between 1882 and 1885 on the spot where once stood the Augustinian canonical foundation church, and inside it still has a ceramic-tile piece of flooring from the old monastery church.
- Romanesque reliefs from about 1120 from the old monastery church can be found on a house on Langgasse (lane) and in the rectory garden. They are stylistically akin to reliefs in the southest vestibule at Mainz Cathedral.
- The Catholic parish church is a Gothic Revival building of quarrystones, built between 1883 and 1885.
- Town hall dating from 1733 with stair tower from 1587 (not pictured).
- Former waldgraviate Amtshaus from 1750.
- The Mennonite church in the outlying centre of Uffhofen is a plain, one-room structure from 1756, remodelled in the 19th century.
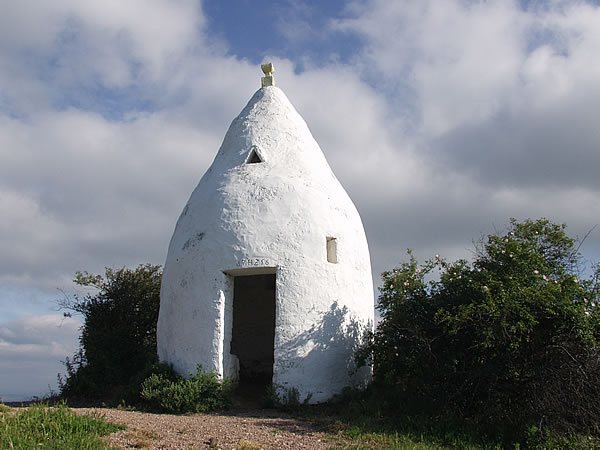
Trullo in Flonheim

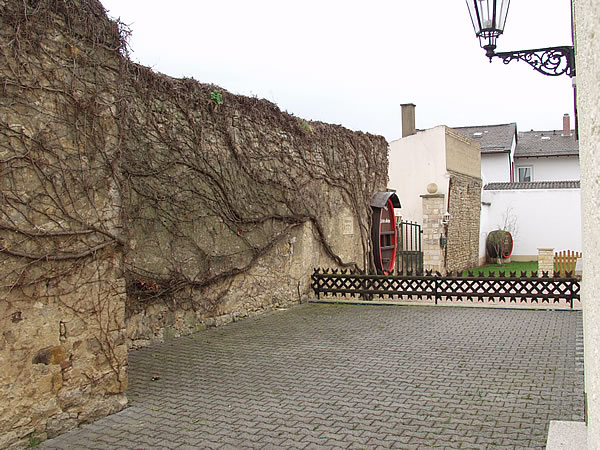
Remnants of the defensive wall built about 1300

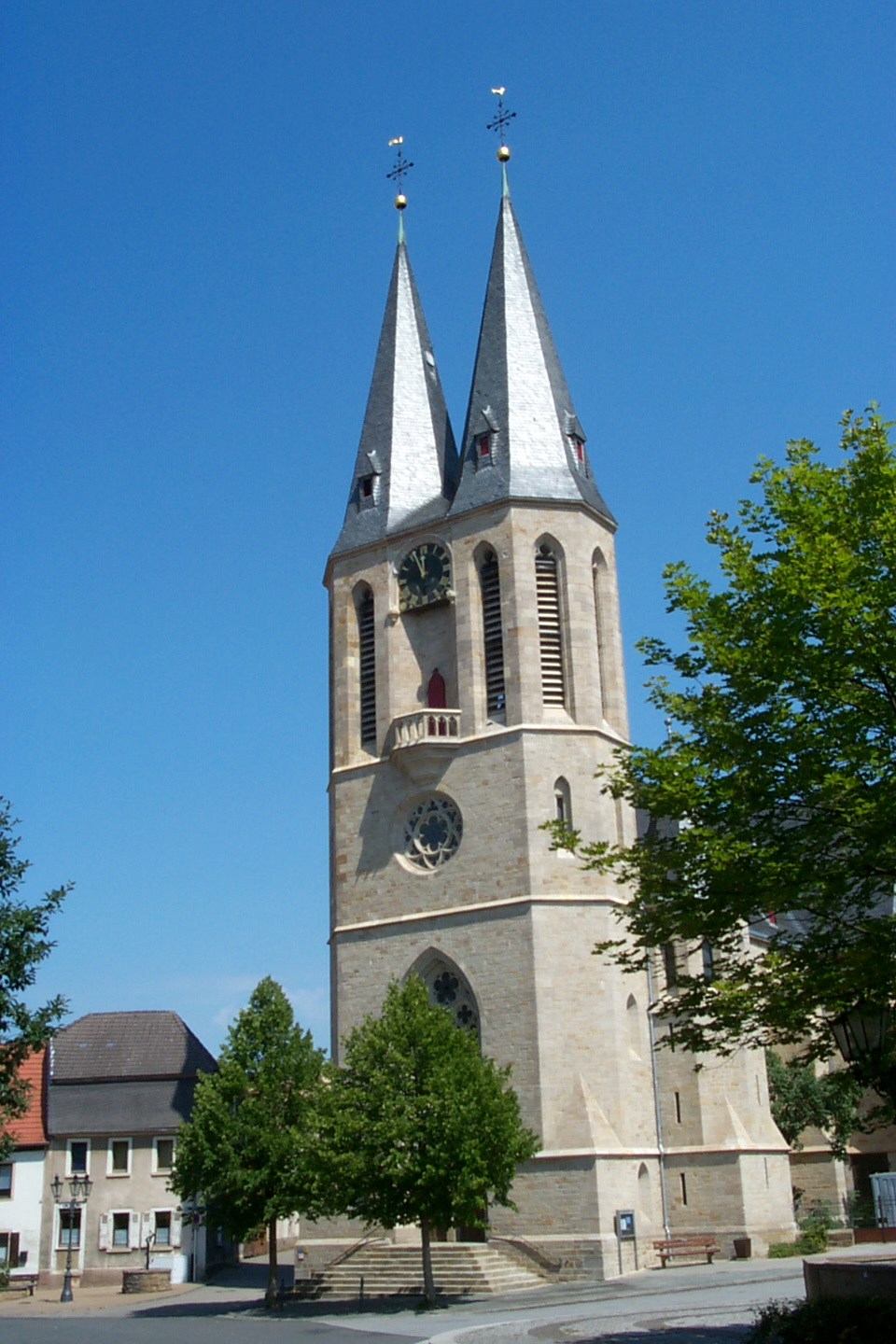
Evangelical church, built on the spot where once stood the Augustinian canonical foundation church.

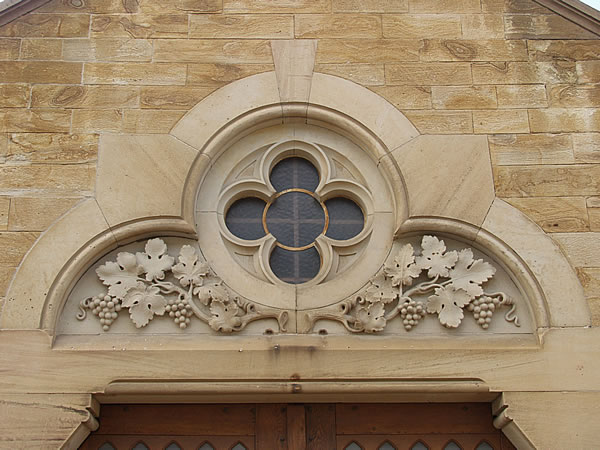
Artistic stonework at the Flonheim vinegar factory

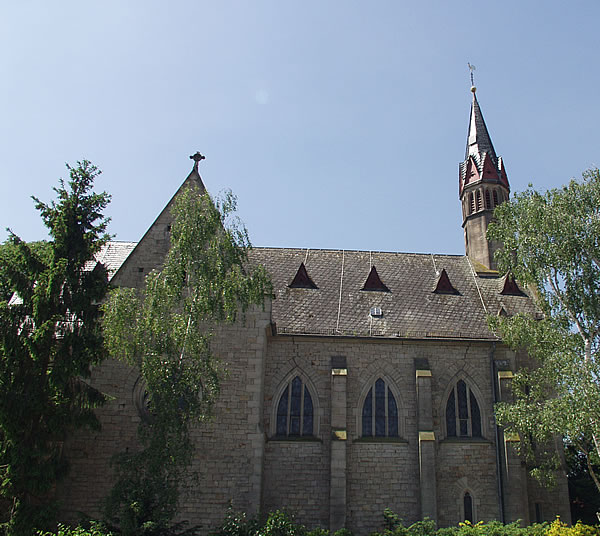
Catholic church

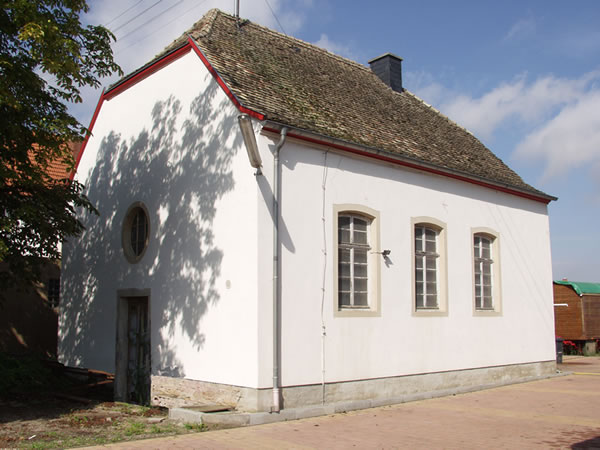
Mennonite church in the outlying centre of Uffhofen

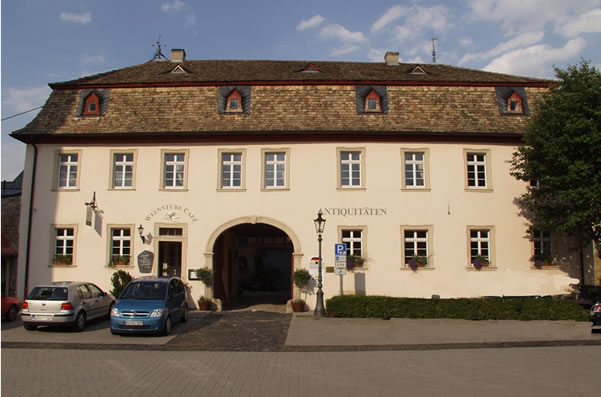
Haus Hinkel, former postal station (Hinkel/Stoft)

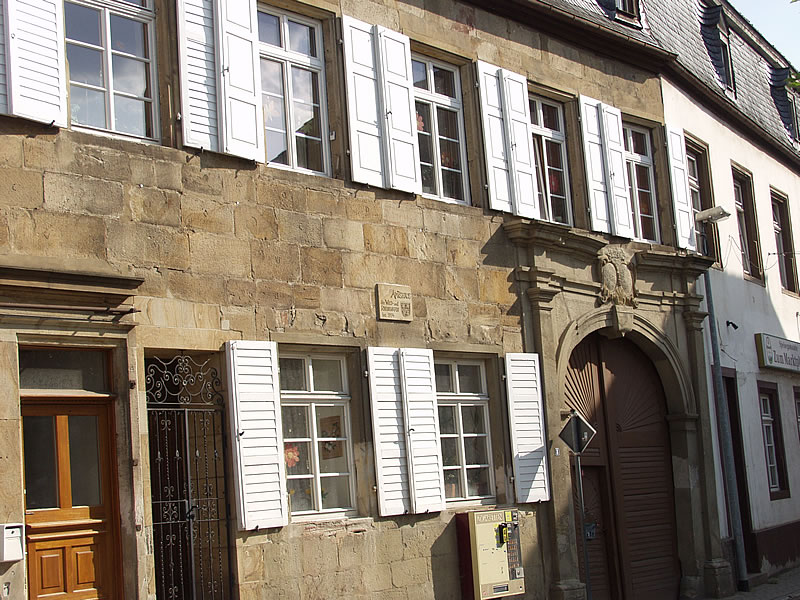
Former waldgraviate Amtshaus from 1750

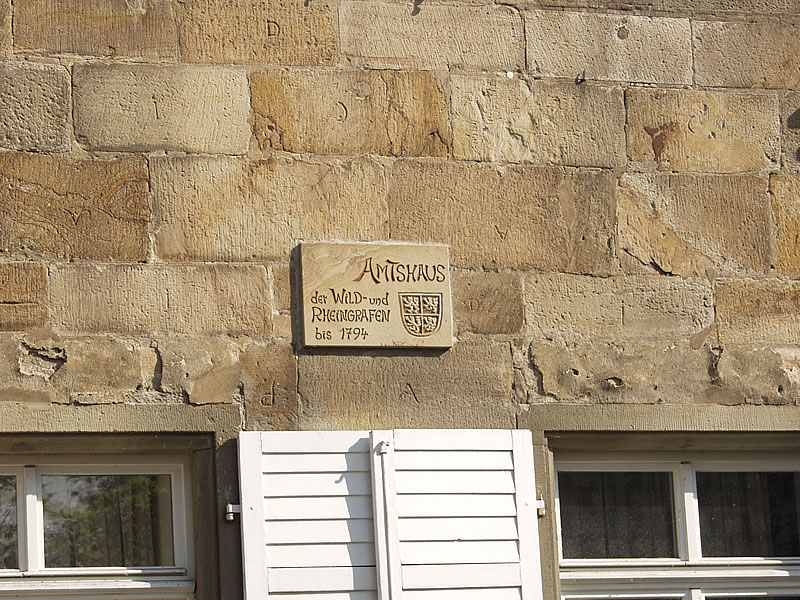
Former waldgraviate Amtshaus from 1750

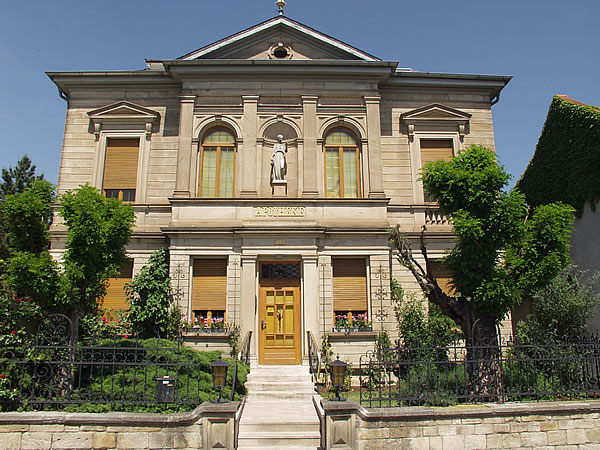
Apothecary, built in 1892 in Italian villa style

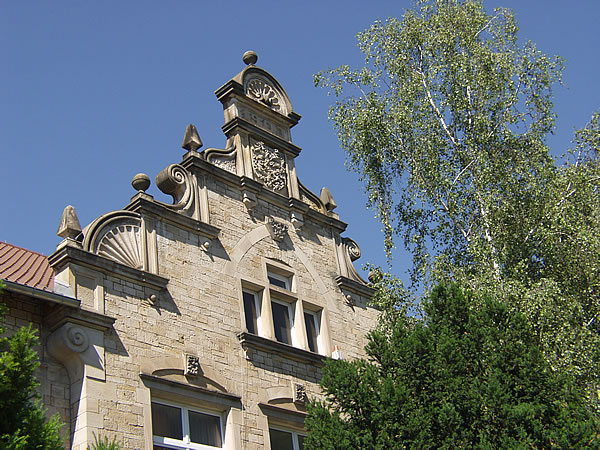
Renaissance Revival gable

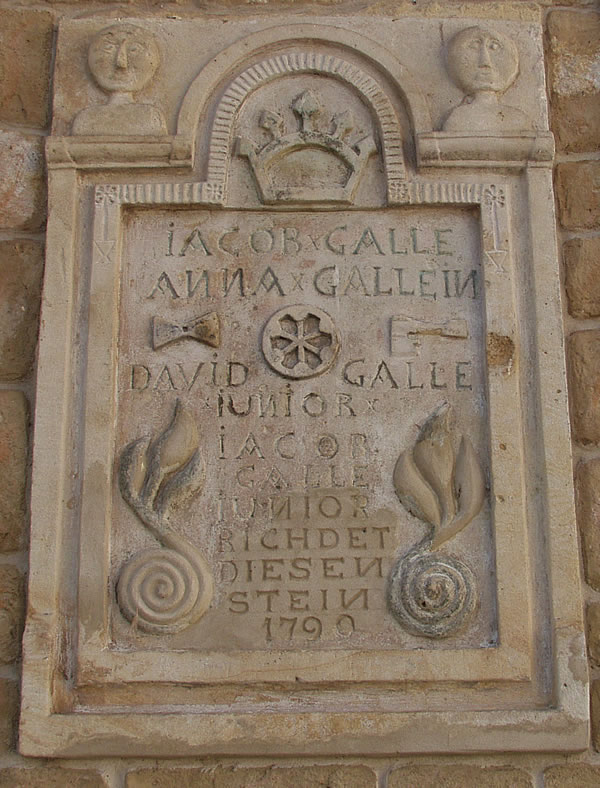
Plaque of remembrance at the Geistermühle House

=== Regular events ===
- Wine market at the historic marketplace – last weekend in May
- Wine festival: In September wine tasting at the producing vineyards during walking tours concluding with grilled treats with the wine.
- Flonheimer Jahrmarkt (yearly market) – first weekend in July
- Mühlentag (“Mill Day”) at the Geistermühle on Whitsunday and Whit Monday
- Christmas Market on the first day of Advent
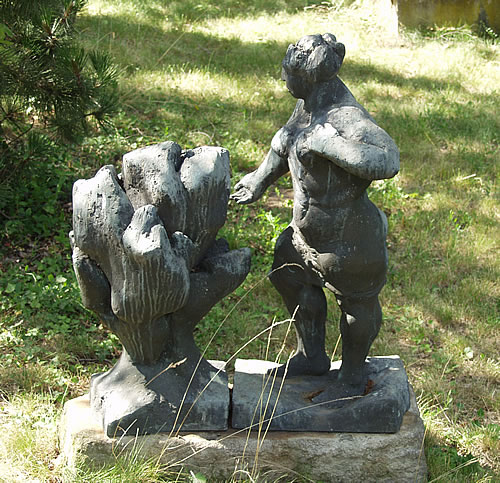
Prof. Eberhard Linke’s exhibition

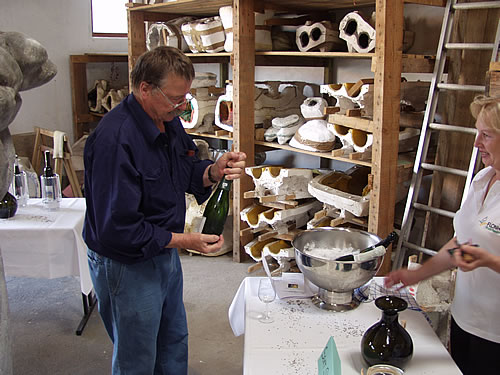
Prof. Eberhard Linke

== Economy and infrastructure ==
=== Transport ===
The Autobahn A 61 with its Bornheim interchange runs by about 5 km away. The A 63 can be reached through the Autobahnkreuz Alzey, an Autobahn junction. Local public transport is limited to buslines run by Omnibusverkehr Rhein-Nahe, notably to the town of Alzey.

There was once a railway station on the Wiesbachtalbahn in Flonheim.

=== Education ===
- Primary school and Hauptschule
