= Albig =

- Municipality
- Coat of arms

- Location of Albig within Alzey-Worms district
- Interactive map of Albig
- Location within Germany Location within Rhineland-Palatinate
- Coordinates: 49°46′N 8°7′E
- Country: Germany
- State: Rhineland-Palatinate
- District: Alzey-Worms
- Municipal assoc.: Alzey-Land

Government
  - Mayor (2019–24): Wilfried Best

Area
  - Total: 10.24 km^{2} (3.95 sq mi)
- Elevation: 216 m (709 ft)

Population (2025-12-31)
  - Total: 1,644
  - Density: 160.5/km^{2} (415.8/sq mi)
- Time zone: UTC+01:00 (CET)
  - Summer (DST): UTC+02:00 (CEST)
- Postal codes: 55234
- Dialling codes: 06731
- Vehicle registration: AZ
- Website: www.alzey-land.de

Albig (German pronunciation: [ˈalbɪç]) is an Ortsgemeinde – a municipality belonging to a Verbandsgemeinde, a kind of collective municipality – in Rhenish Hesse in the Alzey-Worms district in Rhineland-Palatinate, Germany.

== Geography ==
=== Location ===
The municipality lies in Rhenish Hesse and belongs to the Verbandsgemeinde of Alzey-Land, whose seat is in Alzey.

== History ==
Traces of New Stone Age (Spiral Ceramic) and Iron Age settlers, believed to be Celts, have been found in Albig. Some finds, such as fibulae, rings and vessels from a La Tène-era grave, are displayed in the Landesmuseum Mainz. On a hill near Albig, the foundations of a Roman villa rustica were unearthed, and because it was mistakenly believed that they were a mediaeval castle ruin, they were named Schloss Hammerstein, “Schloss” being a German word for castle.

Albig had its first documentary mention in 767 in a document donating a vineyard to Lorsch Abbey.

Since 1975 there has been a partnership with the French municipality of Signy-l'Abbaye in the department of Ardennes.

== Politics ==
=== Mayor ===
Albig's current mayor is Wilfried Best.

=== Coat of arms ===
The municipality's arms might be described thus: Per fess, sable a demi-lion rampant Or armed, langued and crowned gules, and argent the letter A of the third.

== Economy and infrastructure ==
Winegrowing is an important part of local economic life.

=== Transport ===
Within municipal limits lies the Autobahnkreuz Alzey, an Autobahn interchange. The nearest access to the two Autobahnen in question, though, is a good two to three kilometres away. These are Biebelnheim for the A 63 and Bornheim for the A 61.

In the municipality is a stop for Alzey–Mainz and Bingen–Alzey–Worms (Rheinhessenbahn) Regionalbahn trains.

== Culture and sightseeing ==
=== Regular events ===
Albig holds a Wine and Sunflower Festival on the second-last weekend in July. There is also a kermis (church consecration festival, locally known as the Kerb) on the second Sunday in September.
