= Gau-Heppenheim =

- Municipality
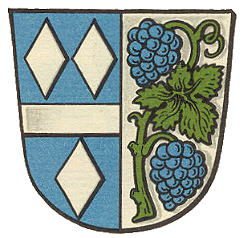
- Coat of arms

- Location of Gau-Heppenheim within Alzey-Worms district
- Interactive map of Gau-Heppenheim
- Location within Germany Location within Rhineland-Palatinate
- Coordinates: 49°44′32″N 08°10′24″E
- Country: Germany
- State: Rhineland-Palatinate
- District: Alzey-Worms
- Municipal assoc.: Alzey-Land

Government
  - Mayor (2019–24): Peter Moritz

Area
  - Total: 5.53 km^{2} (2.14 sq mi)
- Elevation: 280 m (920 ft)

Population (2025-12-31)
  - Total: 569
  - Density: 103/km^{2} (266/sq mi)
- Time zone: UTC+01:00 (CET)
  - Summer (DST): UTC+02:00 (CEST)
- Postal codes: 55234
- Dialling codes: 06731
- Vehicle registration: AZ
- Website: www.alzey-land.de

Gau-Heppenheim is an Ortsgemeinde – a municipality belonging to a Verbandsgemeinde, a kind of collective municipality – in the Alzey-Worms district in Rhineland-Palatinate, Germany.

== Geography ==
=== Location ===
The municipality lies in Rhenish Hesse and belongs to the Verbandsgemeinde of Alzey-Land, whose seat is in Alzey. It has about 550 inhabitants.

== History ==
In 790, Gau-Heppenheim had its first documentary mention as Hepfanheim when several holdings were granted to Lorsch Abbey. The former castle complex, mentioned about 1500, was utterly destroyed in 1766 by a lightning strike and the ensuing fire. Until the late 18th century, the place belonged to the Elector of the Palatinate. Until that time, the village also called itself Heppenheim im Loch (“Heppenheim in the Hole”). In 1903, it was given the name Gau-Heppenheim to distinguish it from other places called Heppenheim.

=== Religion ===
- The Catholic parish in Gau-Heppenheim, St. Urban, is bound to the branch parish of Framersheim. The Catholic share of the population is only some 20% of the whole and its members see themselves as living in a kind of diaspora. Services are not held in the original Gau-Heppenheim parish church, but rather in the “branch” church Sieben Schmerzen Mariens (“Seven Sorrows of Mary”) in Framersheim.

Anton Spiehler was a Catholic priest in Gau-Heppenheim, and later a bishop's secretary, a spiritual adviser and a cathedral capitulary of the Roman Catholic Diocese of Speyer, as well as the deputy head of the diocesan seminary and Summus Custos (“Highest Keeper”) of Speyer Cathedral. He belonged to the so-called Mainz Circle (Mainzer Kreis).

== Politics ==
=== Municipal council ===
The council is made up of 12 council members, who were elected by majority vote at the municipal election held on 7 June 2009, and the honorary mayor as chairman.

=== Mayors ===
- Manfred Becker – FWG (until 2007)
- Klaus Krieger – FWG (2007–2014)
- Helmut Matthäi (2014–2019)
- Peter Moritz (since 2019)

=== Coat of arms ===
The municipality's arms might be described thus: Per pale azure a fess between three lozenges argent, and argent a vine leafed of one vert with two bunches of grapes of the first.

== Culture and sightseeing ==
=== Buildings ===
- The original Romanesque Catholic church, St. Urban, still has a sacristy from 1505. On the unsupported ceiling from 1726 are restored paintings. Only an archway in the sacristy, the north wall and the gabled wall in the west are left of the original Romanesque architecture.
- The Evangelical parish church's nave was built in 1726. Inside is a pulpit from 1730.
- The rectory dates from the late 16th century.
