= Bermersheim vor der Höhe =

- Municipality
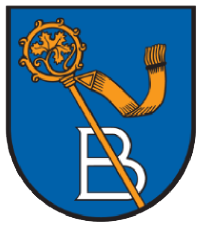
- Coat of arms

- Location of Bermersheim vor der Höhe within Alzey-Worms district
- Interactive map of Bermersheim vor der Höhe
- Location within Germany Location within Rhineland-Palatinate
- Coordinates: 49°40′55″N 8°13′25″E
- Country: Germany
- State: Rhineland-Palatinate
- District: Alzey-Worms
- Municipal assoc.: Alzey-Land

Government
  - Mayor (2019–24): Ute Fillinger

Area
  - Total: 2.87 km^{2} (1.11 sq mi)
- Elevation: 147 m (482 ft)

Population (2025-12-31)
  - Total: 387
  - Density: 135/km^{2} (349/sq mi)
- Time zone: UTC+01:00 (CET)
  - Summer (DST): UTC+02:00 (CEST)
- Postal codes: 55234
- Dialling codes: 06731
- Vehicle registration: AZ

Bermersheim vor der Höhe (German pronunciation: [ˈbɛʁmɐshaɪm foːɐ̯ deːɐ̯ ˈhøːə] lit. 'Bermersheim before the Height') is an Ortsgemeinde – a municipality belonging to a Verbandsgemeinde, a kind of collective municipality – in the Alzey-Worms district in Rhineland-Palatinate, Germany.

== Geography ==
=== Location ===
As a winegrowing centre, Bermersheim vor der Höhe lies in Germany's biggest winegrowing district, in the middle of Rhenish Hesse. It belongs to the Verbandsgemeinde of Alzey-Land, whose seat is in Alzey.

== History ==
The earliest documentary evidence of the name of Bermersheim dates from the year 768, in connection with the sale of an estate to Lorsch Abbey.

The words vor der Höhe (meaning “before the Heights”) were added to the name with effect from 1 April 1971.

== Politics ==
=== Municipal council ===
The council is made up of 8 council members, who were elected by proportional representation at a municipal election held on 7 June 2009, with the honorary mayor as chairman.

The municipal election held on 7 June 2009 yielded the following results:

	SPD	FWG 1	FWG 2	Total
2009	2	5	1	8 seats

=== Mayors ===
- Volker Herberg (.... - 2004)
- Werner Wagner (2004–2014)
- Ute Fillinger (since 2014

== Culture and sightseeing ==
=== Buildings ===
Hildegard of Bingen’s baptismal church is located in Bermersheim vor der Höhe.

== Economy and infrastructure ==
- Winegrowing

== Notable people ==
- Hildegard of Bingen (1098–1179), abbess, writer, composer, philosopher, Christian mystic, visionary and polymath
