= Nieder-Wiesen =

- Municipality
- Coat of arms

- Location of Nieder-Wiesen within Alzey-Worms district
- Interactive map of Nieder-Wiesen
- Location within Germany Location within Rhineland-Palatinate
- Coordinates: 49°44′N 7°59′E
- Country: Germany
- State: Rhineland-Palatinate
- District: Alzey-Worms
- Municipal assoc.: Alzey-Land

Government
  - Mayor (2019–24): Holger Waldschmidt

Area
  - Total: 4.89 km^{2} (1.89 sq mi)
- Elevation: 225 m (738 ft)

Population (2025-12-31)
  - Total: 588
  - Density: 120/km^{2} (311/sq mi)
- Time zone: UTC+01:00 (CET)
  - Summer (DST): UTC+02:00 (CEST)
- Postal codes: 55234
- Dialling codes: 06736
- Vehicle registration: AZ
- Website: www.alzey-land.de

Nieder-Wiesen is an Ortsgemeinde – a municipality belonging to a Verbandsgemeinde, a kind of collective municipality – in the Alzey-Worms district in Rhineland-Palatinate, Germany.

== Geography ==
=== Location ===
The municipality lies in Rhenish Hesse and belongs to the Verbandsgemeinde of Alzey-Land, whose seat is in Alzey. It has roughly 650 inhabitants.

In Nieder-Wiesen, the Rheinhessisches Hügelland (Rhenish-Hessian Upland) gives way to the foothills of the North Palatine Highland, thus explaining the former presence of the old border running along the Wiesbach 500 m south of the village which once marked the place where the Grand Duchy of Hesse (“GH”) met the Palatine exclave ruled by the Kingdom of Bavaria (“KB”). Even today along the old border, border stones can be found with the aforesaid initials on them. Even today's district boundary between Alzey-Worms and the Donnersbergkreis follows this alignment, as does the jurisdictional boundary between the Evangelical Church in Hesse and Nassau and the Evangelical Church of the Palatinate.

The rural location on the Wiesbach – nowadays known as the Rhenish-Hessian Switzerland (Rheinhessische Schweiz) – has appealed to the Celts, who built a place of worship or a castle on the Schlossberg (mountain).

== Religion ==
Nieder-Wiesen is a mostly Protestant village. There is an Evangelical church. Only in neighbouring villages can a Catholic church be found. Before the persecution and outright murder wrought by the National Socialists, Nieder-Wiesen was home to a remarkably large Jewish community that formed about a third of the population. Their synagogue was set on fire and destroyed as part of Kristallnacht (9 November 1938). Witness thereto is a memorial plaque at the Evangelical church. Also bearing witness to the former Jewish community is the Jewish graveyard lying roughly 400 m south of the village.

== Politics ==
=== Municipal council ===
The council is made up of 12 council members, who were elected at the municipal election held on 7 June 2009, and the honorary mayor as chairman.

The municipal election held on 7 June 2009 yielded the following results:

	SPD	CDU	FWG	Total
2009	4	3	5	12 seats
2004	5	3	4	12 seats

=== Mayors ===
- Friedrich Brunk, SPD (1999–2004)
- Hans Wilhelm Kern, FWG (2004–2014)
- Gernot Heck, CDU (2014–2016)
- Holger Waldschmidt, FWG (2016–present)

=== Coat of arms ===
The municipality's arms might be described thus: Argent between two bars gules the letters N and W sable flanked by two blocks of the second, in chief four blocks in fess of the second, in base two blocks in fess of the second.

== Economy and infrastructure ==
=== Public institutions ===
==== Sport and leisure facilities ====
Besides the sport facilities usually found in such a small village (grass football pitch with sport club house), there are two tennis courts right in the village centre.

There is a youth tent site, cabin and community centre in the Wiesbach valley run by the Alzey-Worms district, Alzey. In warmer months, tents are pitched and there is the opportunity to take part in the Alzey Forest Bureau's woodland education programme.

Nieder-Wiesen also has a barbecue area run by the Rhenish-Hessian Switzerland Recreational Area Association with a big barbecue pavilion as well as equipment. It is to be found across from the sport facilities at the edge of the woods.

Also to be found lying before the youth tent site in Nieder-Wiesen is a big Wanderparkplatz (“hiking park square”) with information and display notices about the trails that have been laid out and marked and the Nordic walking courses through the Vorholz Forest Area.

There is a permanent International Federation of Popular Sports (IVV) hiking trail, a loop through the Vorholz, running for 10 km through the Rhenish-Hessian Switzerland. It begins and ends at the TuS (sport club) Nieder-Wiesen's clubhouse at the sport ground.

=== Community centres ===
The Gemeindehalle (“municipal hall”) is a converted barn of a former typically Frankish homestead. The building's original character was retained, and it offers a nice ambiance for celebrations. Equipped with a modern kitchen, drink cooling, stage and gallery, it can handle an event with up to 150 persons. It can be hired through the municipal administration. The Bürgerhaus (“citizens’ house”) with its kitchen and great hall is part of the former school (a modern wing built in 1988) and it can likewise be hired through the municipal administration.

=== Education ===
==== Kindergarten ====
The municipal kindergarten has one group with places for 25 children. The institution is certified by the state of Rhineland-Palatinate as a Bewegungskindergarten (one that emphasizes physical activity as a paedagogical tool).

=== Transport ===
The nearest railway stations are Alzey (11 km east of Nieder-Wiesen with half-hourly Regionalexpress trains to Mainz and hourly Regionalbahn trains to Worms, Bingen am Rhein and Kirchheimbolanden) and Alsenz (17 km west with regular connections to Bad Kreuznach and Kaiserslautern). A bus link, route 425 run by Omnibusverkehr Rhein-Nahe, to and from the district seat of Alzey runs on weekdays. Moreover, several shared-taxi connections are daily at hand.

== Culture and sightseeing ==
=== Buildings ===
==== Evangelical church ====
The Evangelical church is a Baroque one-room structure built in 1723 as the then resident church of the Barons of Hunolstein on the spot where once had stood another church built in 1462. Remains of the nobles’ seat are still recognizable inside. The church is equipped with the oldest and smallest Stumm organ in Rhenish Hesse (from about 1725) with a stylish character (eight stops). On one side wall are found the family Hunolstein's graves, and on the other the Reverend Johann Wilhelm Fresenius's (died 1727), whose son Johann Philipp not only served as a clergyman in Nieder-Wiesen, but also later, as a senior clergyman in Frankfurt am Main, ministered to Johann Wolfgang von Goethe’s parents and even christened the poet himself shortly after his birth. Furthermore, the clerical family Fresenius’s descendants founded a healthcare business that today is active worldwide, and also a well known chemical analysis institute.

Baroque pastoral paintings adorn the pulpit with the Four Evangelists, and along the gallery balustrade’s whole breadth, a painting of the Twelve Apostles with Jesus in the middle can be seen. From early Lutheran times come the Eucharist chests, which are scattered about the altar area. Since 1822, the parish has been Evangelical-United.

The font comes from 1971 and was originally in the Immanuel-Kirche in Königstein im Taunus, but did not arrive in Nieder-Wiesen without a sojourn first in Ringleben in the Kyffhäuserkreis in Thuringia, finally coming back to western Germany and its new home in Nieder-Wiesen in 1996.

Artistically valuable are the altar antependia, among others a work in appliqué after a concept by Darmstadt artist Thomas Duttenhöfer from 1989 called “Jesus’s Entry into Jerusalem”. Upon close inspection, though, it turns out that the place depicted in the work, far from being the Holy City, is in fact Nieder-Wiesen, with its former synagogue on fire.

The church's loft is used for a bat and barn owl project as a measure to safeguard Creation.

In 2000, the church's outside was given an extensive renovation, and in 2008, the inside was also done.

The entrance portal is furnished with the clerical family Fresenius's heraldic motto from Psalm 92: Die gepflanzt sind im Hause des Herrn, werden in den Vorhöfen unseres Gottes grünen (“Planted in the Lord’s house, they grow in the courts of our God”), and above is found the Hunolstein family's former coat of arms with the noble crown.

The coat of arms – albeit now without the noble crown – with the marking “NW” to make it Nieder-Wiesen's civic arms was set into the street paving in 2000 in the square before the church. Across from the church, on the bank of the Wiesbach, stands a “Resista” elm as a measure to fight Dutch elm disease in Rhenish Hesse. (“Resista” cultivars are supposed to have very high resistance to this fungal affliction).

A few metres farther is found the stylishly shaped memorial to victims of the First and Second World Wars.

==== Schloss Nieder-Wiesen ====
In the village stands a former moated castle, although nowadays, no more water flows through the moat. This was built in 1722 by the Barons of Hunolstein, who helped the region attain both prestige and wealth by mining quicksilver. Today, the small castle with its Baroque-style gardens is in private ownership. Still to be found on the stucco ceiling in the former reception hall are allegorical representations of the four seasons. The former stable with its vaulting serves today as a ballroom. It can be hired for events.

==== Nieder-Wiesen ford ====
A ford in the municipal area is crossing the Wiesbach. The 4 m-wide brook can be crossed here even in vehicles, although it is advisable to note the water conditions beforehand. The open area before the ford was built as a rest area on the Napoleon-Kneipp Hiking Trail, which runs through Nieder-Wiesen, with a Kneipp arm bath basin and an informational notice.

==== Neumühle with waterwheel ====
Roughly one kilometre outside the village towards Wendelsheim is found the Neumühle (“New Mill”), a former Hunolstein homestead. Worth seeing here is the fully functional overshot waterwheel, which today is run to generate renewable electrical energy from the flowing water.

=== Countryside ===
==== Streuobstwiese “Auf der Gipp” ====
On the way out of the village towards Wendelsheim, started in 1991, is a meadow orchard or streuobstwiese. Its area is about 1 ha, and there are all kinds of native fruit trees planted there that once grew all around the village of Nieder-Wiesen in great numbers. Seeing to the ecological management is the Evangelical church (there is a yearly “apple juice project”). An informational notice explaining the various fruit trees can be found at the orchard's lower edge, and at the upper end is an “insect hotel”, installed in 2008.

== Notable people ==
- Johann Philipp Fresenius (1705–1761), 18th-century Evangelical-Lutheran theologian (among other things, senior clergyman in Frankfurt am Main)
