= Freimersheim =

- Municipality
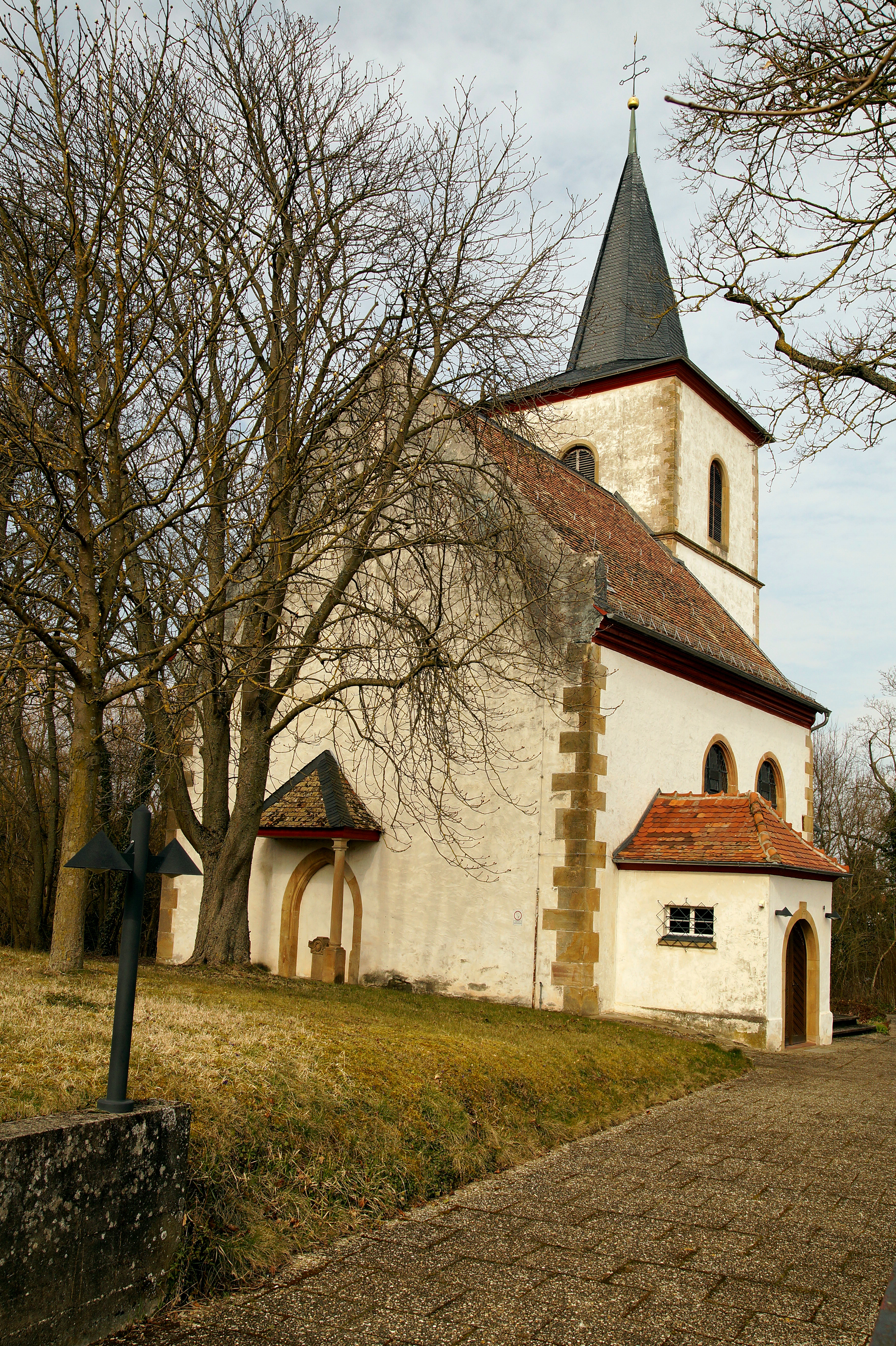
- catholic church

- Coat of arms

- Location of Freimersheim within Alzey-Worms district
- Interactive map of Freimersheim
- Location within Germany Location within Rhineland-Palatinate
- Coordinates: 49°42′30″N 08°05′21″E
- Country: Germany
- State: Rhineland-Palatinate
- District: Alzey-Worms
- Municipal assoc.: Alzey-Land

Government
  - Mayor (2019–24): Jacques Garrido

Area
  - Total: 6.41 km^{2} (2.47 sq mi)
- Elevation: 296 m (971 ft)

Population (2025-12-31)
  - Total: 679
  - Density: 106/km^{2} (274/sq mi)
- Time zone: UTC+01:00 (CET)
  - Summer (DST): UTC+02:00 (CEST)
- Postal codes: 55234
- Dialling codes: 06731
- Vehicle registration: AZ

Freimersheim (German pronunciation: [ˈfʁaɪmɐshaɪm]) is an Ortsgemeinde – a municipality belonging to a Verbandsgemeinde, a kind of collective municipality – in the Alzey-Worms district in Rhineland-Palatinate, Germany.

== Geography ==
=== Location ===
The municipality lies in Rhenish Hesse and is a winegrowing centre in the like-named wine region. It belongs to the Verbandsgemeinde of Alzey-Land, whose seat is in Alzey. Freimersheim lies at the source of the Weidasserbach.

Its agricultural origins can still be seen clearly, though it now also has many people who work in surrounding cities such as Alzey or Worms.

Freimersheim has its own railway station with hourly trains towards Mainz and Frankfurt am Main as well as an Autobahn interchange on the A 63. There are also regular bus links to Alzey.

== History ==
In 763, Freimersheim had its first documentary mention in a document from Lorsch Abbey, and through most of its history was an abbey possession. The name comes from Frimâr, and means “Frimâr’s (and his kin’s) settlement”. Belonging to the Amt of Alzey, Freimersheim was under Electoral Palatinate’s ownership from the High Middle Ages until the French Revolution.

Over the years, Freimersheim has been called by a number of varying names, including Frimersheim (763), Frigmersheim (770), Freimaresheim (790), Vreimersheim (1263), Frimirsheim (1281), Freysenn (1294), Frymersheim (1303) and Freymershaim (1337). At the end of the 18th century, it was called Freimersheim hinter der Warte (“behind the Warte”, a mountain), to distinguish it from Framersheim.

After the Second World War, many ethnic Germans driven out of Germany’s former eastern territories, foremost among these, Silesians, came to settle in this rural idyll, many of whom have stayed until today and still often work regularly as harvest helpers.

In 2003, after long debates within the administration, Freimersheim at last acquired a sewer system, which was completed in late 2007.

== Politics ==
=== Municipal council ===
The council is made up of 12 council members, who were elected by majority vote at the municipal election held on 7 June 2009, and the honorary mayor as chairman.

=== Mayors ===
- Hiltrud Neu (...–2004)
- Wilfried Brück (2004–2019)
- Jacques Garrido (2019–present)

=== Coat of arms ===
The municipality’s arms might be described thus: Argent a lion rampant Or armed, langued and crowned gules, in his paws the letter F argent.

== Culture and sightseeing ==
=== Buildings ===
Freimersheim has two churches, a Catholic one from the 13th century, and an Evangelical one with a Stumm organ. Another, small, attraction is offered by a wooden house built in rustic style in imitation of the original Freimersheim timber-frame houses. The inside, however, has thus far not been finished. There is further a well preserved water cistern from the 19th century to view, built on a hill next to the railway tracks. It has been being restored since 2006 by private citizens.

=== Sport ===
Besides a sporting ground, Freimersheim also has a hiking area. The football club TV Freimersheim, with some 300 members, is active in youth work.

== Economy and infrastructure ==
=== Transport ===
There is a railway station that not only handles trains bound for Mainz and Frankfurt, but also affords transit to a private railway from Kirchheimbolanden to Alzey.

== Other ==
Until 1993, showers were forbidden in Freimersheim by the local authorities. This quaintness stemmed from a bylaw that had been prompted by a water shortage in the mid 19th century, called the Verbot über den Gebrauch frei fallenden Wassers zum Zwecke der flächigen Reinigung (“Ban on the use of free-falling water for the purpose of cleaning surfaces”).
