= Esselborn =

- Municipality
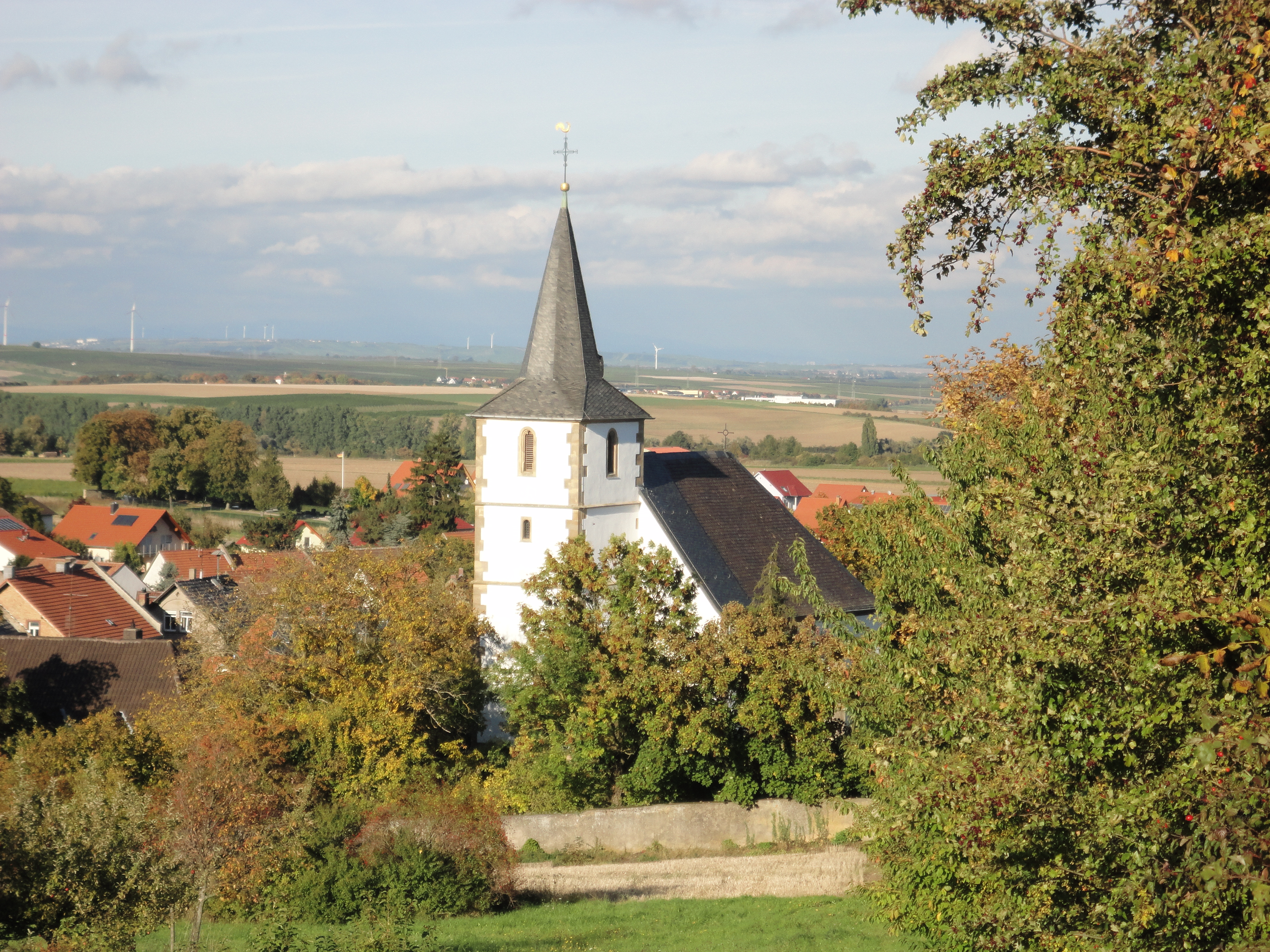

- Coat of arms

- Location of Esselborn within Alzey-Worms district
- Interactive map of Esselborn
- Location within Germany Location within Rhineland-Palatinate
- Coordinates: 49°42′55″N 08°07′07″E
- Country: Germany
- State: Rhineland-Palatinate
- District: Alzey-Worms
- Municipal assoc.: Alzey-Land

Government
  - Mayor (2019–24): Jan Weindorf

Area
  - Total: 4.10 km^{2} (1.58 sq mi)
- Elevation: 229 m (751 ft)

Population (2025-12-31)
  - Total: 391
  - Density: 95.4/km^{2} (247/sq mi)
- Time zone: UTC+01:00 (CET)
  - Summer (DST): UTC+02:00 (CEST)
- Postal codes: 55234
- Dialling codes: 06731
- Vehicle registration: AZ
- Website: www.gemeinde-esselborn.de

Esselborn is an Ortsgemeinde – a municipality belonging to a Verbandsgemeinde, a kind of collective municipality – in the Alzey-Worms district in Rhineland-Palatinate, Germany.

== Geography ==
The municipality lies in Rhenish Hesse.

== History ==
In 763, Esselborn had its first documentary mention. Held at first by the Lords of Strahlenberg, Esselborn was then an Electoral Palatinate possession as of 1408.

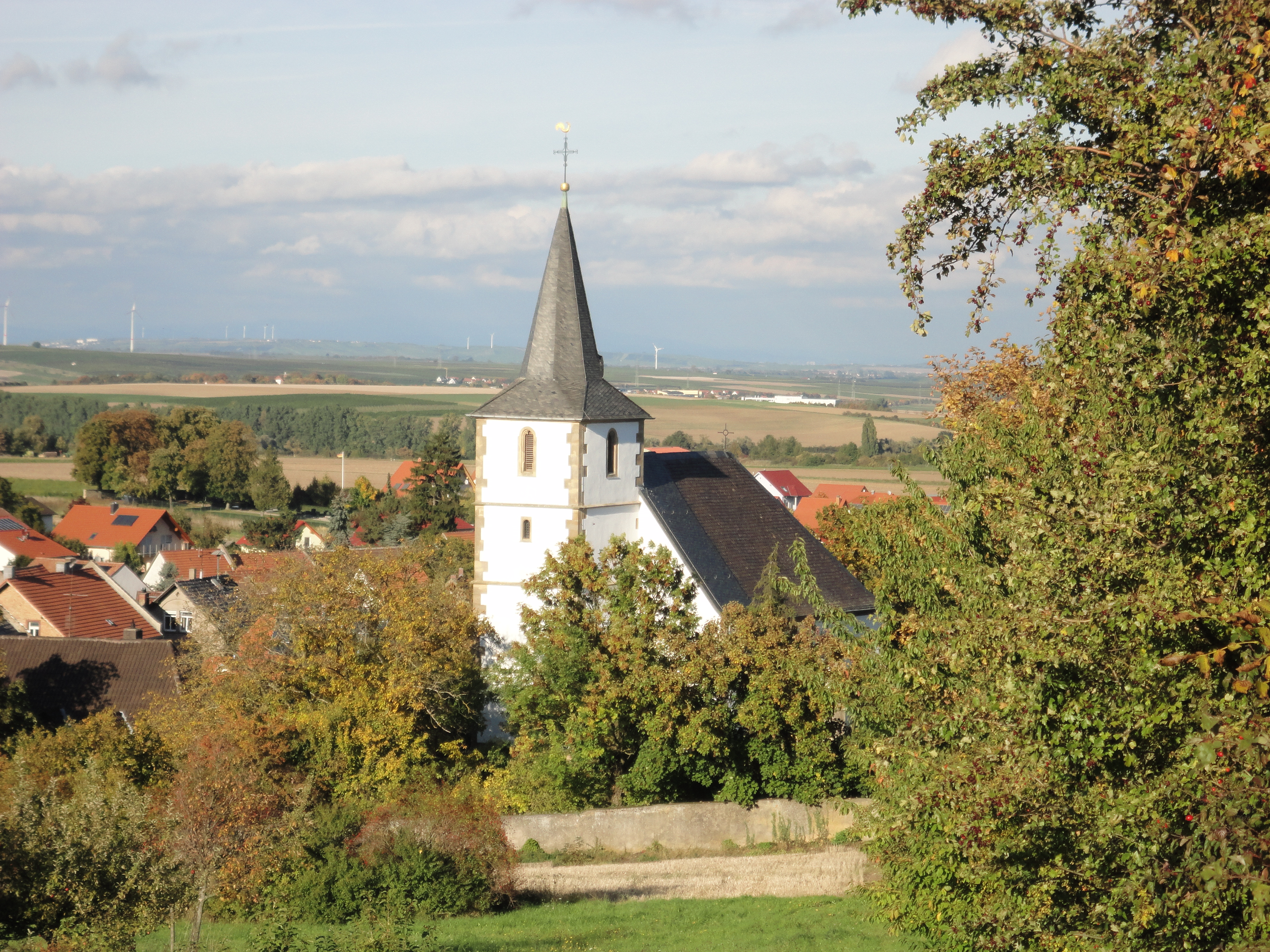
Church in Esselborn, 13th century

== Politics ==
=== Town council ===
The council is made up of 8 council members, who were elected at the municipal election held on 7 June 2009, and the honorary mayor as chairman.

The municipal election held on 7 June 2009 yielded the following results:

| | Oberhellmann | Reßler | Total |
| 2009 | 5 | 3 | 8 seats |

In 2004 there was an election by majority vote.

=== Coat of arms ===
The municipality's arms might be described thus: Argent two batons per saltire gules, the one in bend sinister surmounting the other, fastened thereto with a nail, and with a branch couped palewise in base dexter, in base a rose twig vert with one rose of the second barbed and seeded proper.
