= Dintesheim =

- Municipality
- Coat of arms

- Location of Dintesheim within Alzey-Worms district
- Interactive map of Dintesheim
- Location within Germany Location within Rhineland-Palatinate
- Coordinates: 49°42′27″N 08°08′36″E
- Country: Germany
- State: Rhineland-Palatinate
- District: Alzey-Worms
- Municipal assoc.: Alzey-Land

Government
  - Mayor (2019–24): Frank Uwe Altendorf

Area
  - Total: 1.96 km^{2} (0.76 sq mi)
- Elevation: 205 m (673 ft)

Population (2025-12-31)
  - Total: 158
  - Density: 80.6/km^{2} (209/sq mi)
- Time zone: UTC+01:00 (CET)
  - Summer (DST): UTC+02:00 (CEST)
- Postal codes: 55234
- Dialling codes: 06735
- Vehicle registration: AZ

Dintesheim is an Ortsgemeinde – a municipality belonging to a Verbandsgemeinde, a kind of collective municipality – in the Alzey-Worms district in Rhineland-Palatinate, Germany.

== Geography ==
As a winegrowing centre, Dintesheim lies in Germany's biggest winegrowing district, in the middle of Rhenish Hesse. It belongs to the Verbandsgemeinde of Alzey-Land, whose seat is in Alzey.

== Politics ==
The council is made up of 6 council members, who are elected by majority vote, with the honorary mayor as chairman.

The last municipal election was held on 7 June 2009.
