= Rhenish-Hessian Switzerland =

Protected landscape area in Rheinland-Palatinate, Germany

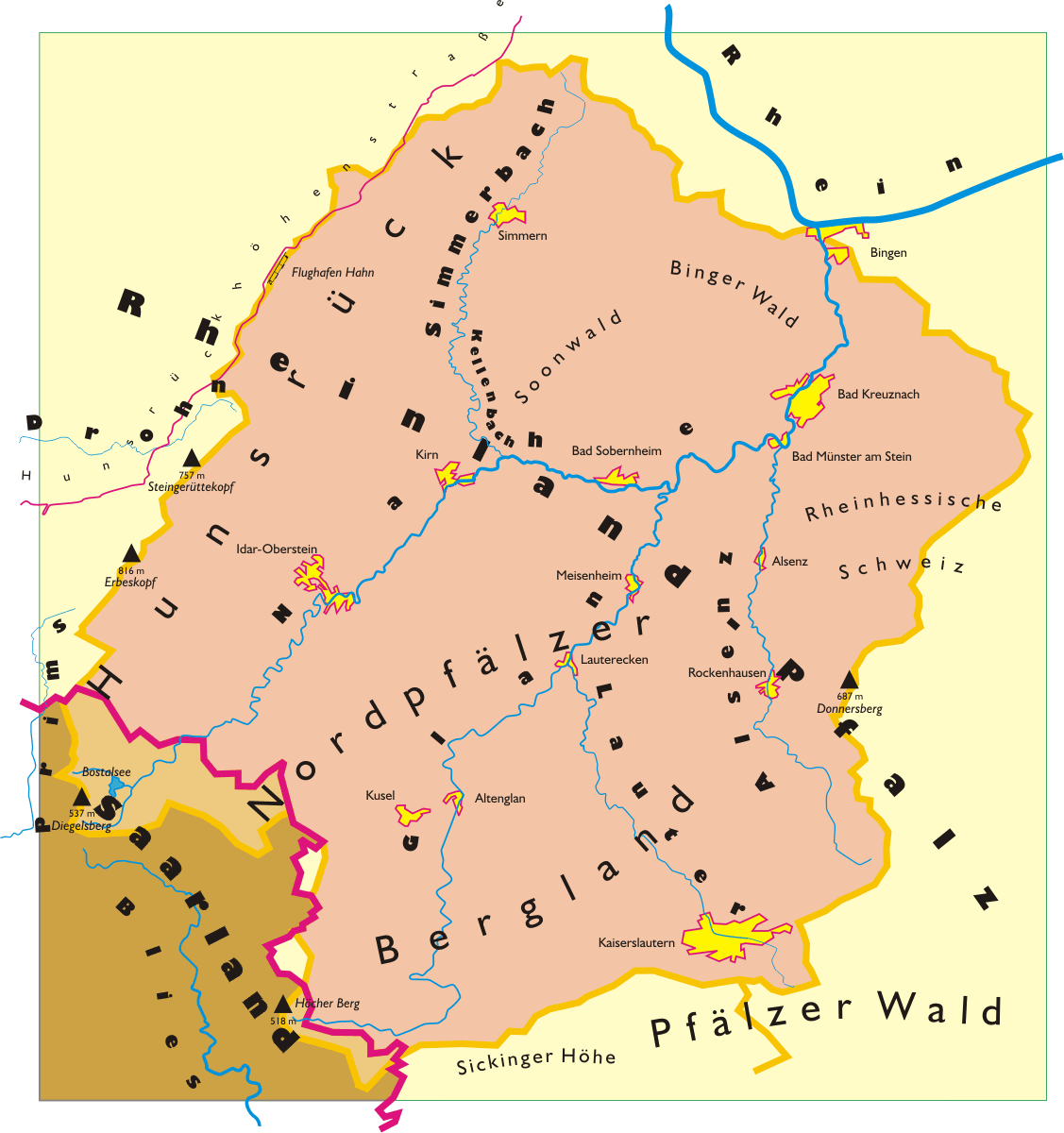
Location of Rhenish-Hessian Switzerland (in the east)

Rhenish-Hessian Switzerland (German: Rheinhessische Schweiz) is a protected landscape and recreation area in the southwest of the German region of Rhenish Hesse (Rheinhessen). It was established in 1961 and has an area of 6,766 hectares.

The following municipalities lies within the protected area: Bechenheim, Erbes-Büdesheim, Frei-Laubersheim, Fürfeld, Nack, Neu-Bamberg, Nieder-Wiesen, Siefersheim, Stein-Bockenheim, Tiefenthal, Wendelsheim and Wöllstein.

== See also ==
- Little Switzerland (landscape)
