= Ober-Flörsheim =

- Municipality
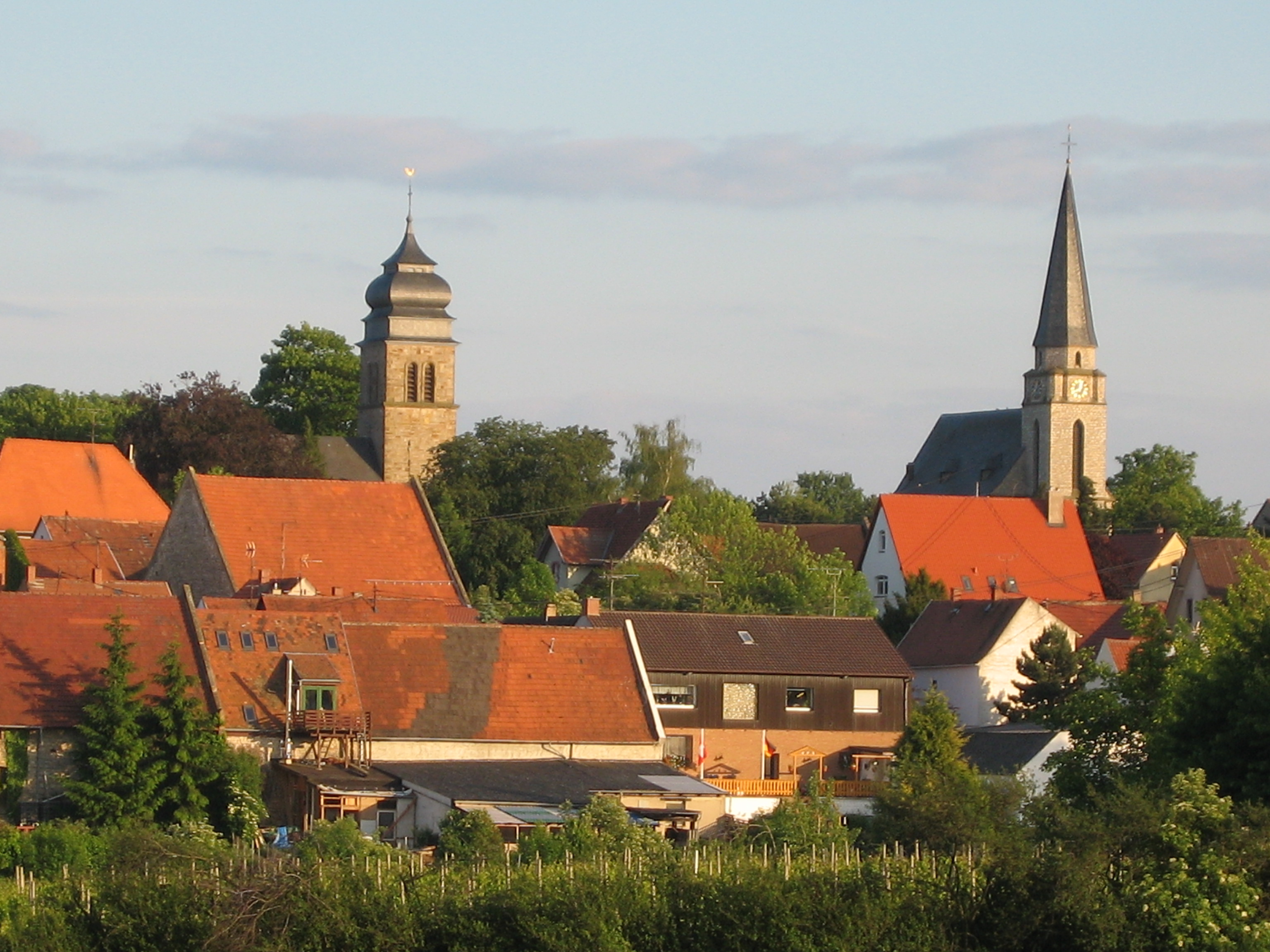
- catholic church (left) and protestant church (right)

- Coat of arms

- Location of Ober-Flörsheim within Alzey-Worms district
- Interactive map of Ober-Flörsheim
- Location within Germany Location within Rhineland-Palatinate
- Coordinates: 49°40′59″N 08°09′19″E
- Country: Germany
- State: Rhineland-Palatinate
- District: Alzey-Worms
- Municipal assoc.: Alzey-Land

Government
  - Mayor (2019–24): Sascha Leonhardt

Area
  - Total: 10.24 km^{2} (3.95 sq mi)
- Elevation: 244 m (801 ft)

Population (2025-12-31)
  - Total: 1,339
  - Density: 130.8/km^{2} (338.7/sq mi)
- Time zone: UTC+01:00 (CET)
  - Summer (DST): UTC+02:00 (CEST)
- Postal codes: 55234
- Dialling codes: 06735
- Vehicle registration: AZ
- Website: www.ober-floersheim.de

Ober-Flörsheim is an Ortsgemeinde – a municipality belonging to a Verbandsgemeinde, a kind of collective municipality – in the Alzey-Worms district in Rhineland-Palatinate, Germany.

== Geography ==
=== Location ===
Ober-Flörsheim lies on a high plateau in the Rheinhessen wine region. It belongs to the Verbandsgemeinde of Alzey-Land, whose seat is in Alzey.

== History ==
In 776, Flarlesheim superiori had its first documentary mention in a donation document from Lorsch Abbey. From 1237 until the late 18th century, the Teutonic Knights ran a commandry in the village. From 1506, Ober-Flörsheim belonged to Electoral Palatinate and was made part of the Oberamt of Alzey. In the Thirty Years' War, Swedish troops laid waste the commandry and the village. In 1689, the village was dealt a further blow by French troops under King Louis XIV when they laid the Palatinate waste during the Nine Years' War.

During the wars in the wake of the French Revolution, there was a battle on 30 March 1793 near Ober-Flörsheim in which the Prussians beat the French. Even so, this defeat would not thwart France's ultimate success in the campaign, and thereby Ober-Flörsheim, along with the rest of the territories on the Rhine’s left bank, was annexed by France in 1797, and the village became part of the Department of Mont-Tonnerre (or Donnersberg in German).

After the Napoleonic Empire had been defeated, Ober-Flörsheim became part of the newly founded province of Rhenish Hesse (Rheinhessen) in the Grand Duchy of Hesse-Darmstadt in 1816.

On 20 March 1945, American troops occupied Ober-Flörsheim, which nevertheless was transferred to the French zone of occupation in the summer of that same year, later also being grouped into the newly formed state of Rhineland-Palatinate, to which the village has belonged ever since. The region, though, is still called Rhenish Hesse, even though it is no longer part of Hesse. Since 1972, Ober-Flörsheim has also belonged to the Verbandsgemeinde of Alzey-Land.

=== Religion ===
Although Ober-Flörsheim was Reformed in the 16th century, Catholic services were reintroduced in 1698. The Reformed once again achieved ascendancy over the parish church in 1705 with the Palatine Church Sharing (Pfälzische Kirchenteilung, whereby Protestants had to share their churches with Catholics). For a long time, the two denominations stood side by side. In 1747, the Lutherans came to be the third denomination in the village, and they were able to build their own church. In 1876, the Free Protestant parish, a breakaway group from the Evangelical Church, was founded.

=== Population development ===
- 1787 - 516 inhabitants
- 1815 - 851 inhabitants
- 1849 - 1,223 inhabitants (858 Evangelical, 272 Catholic, 91 Mennonite)
- 1870 - 1,094 inhabitants (799 Evangelical, 265 Catholic, 44 Mennonite)
- 1900 - 1,014 inhabitants (533 Evangelical, 236 Catholic, 231 Free Protestant, 21 Mennonite)
- 2004 - 1,104 inhabitants
- 2008 - 1,191 inhabitants (566 Evangelical, 331 Roman Catholic, 67 other, 227 none)
- 2012 - 1.237 inhabitants (575 Evangelical, 344 Roman Catholic, 35 other, 283 none)
- 2014 - 1.205 inhabitants (531 Evangelical, 317 Roman Catholic, 34 other, 323 none)

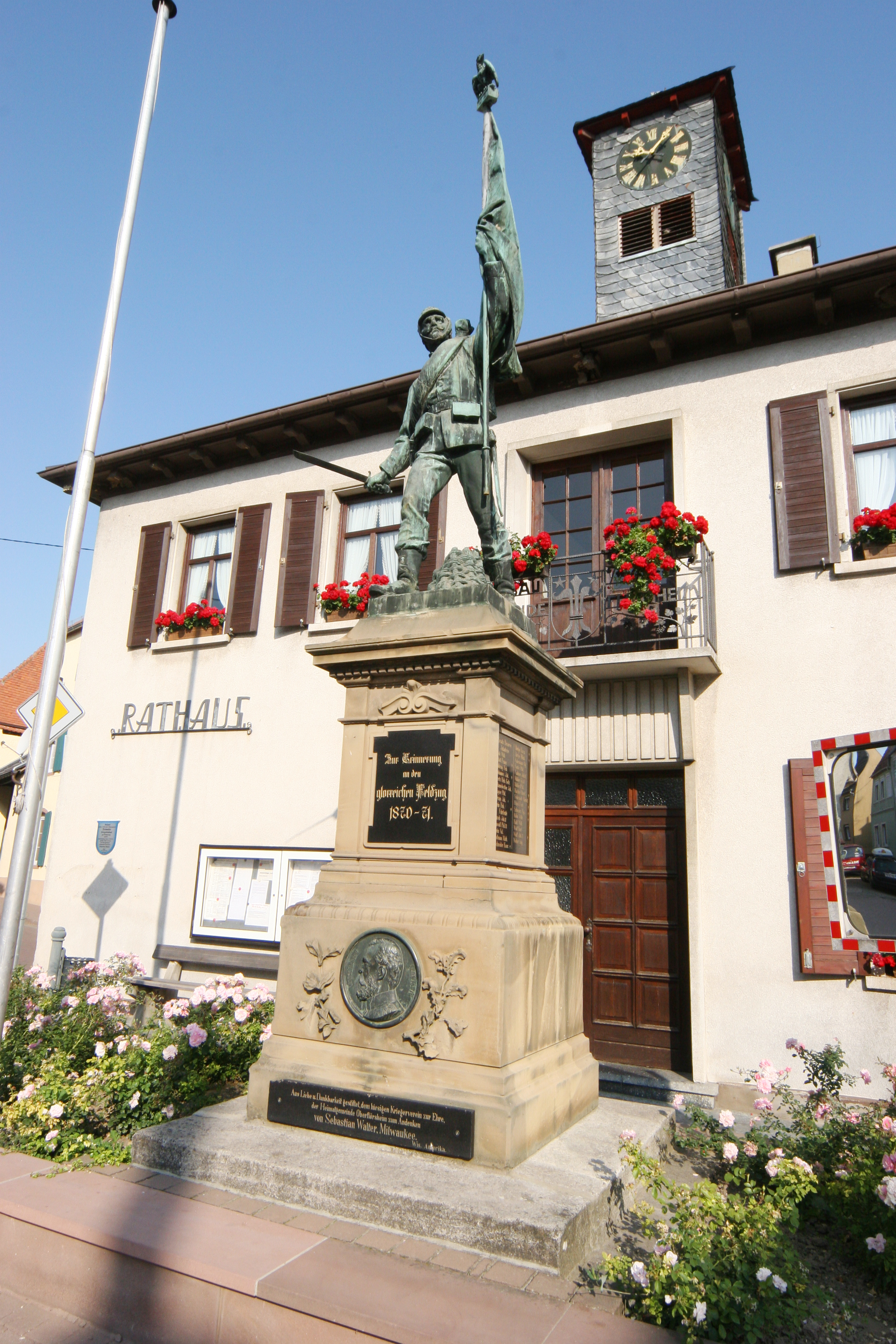
The memorial to those from Ober-Flörsheim who fought in the Franco-Prussian War. It was a gift to the municipality in 1901 from an Ober-Flörsheimer who had emigrated to the USA. It stands before the town hall.

- 2022 – 1.332 inhabitants
- 2023 – 1.324 inhabitants
- 2024 – 1.348 inhabitants

== Politics ==
=== Municipal council ===
The council is made up of 16 council members, who were elected at the municipal election held on 7 June 2009, and the honorary mayor as chairman.

The municipal election held on 25 May 2014 yielded the following results:

	FWG Gardt	FWG	Total
2014	10	6	16 seats

=== Mayors ===
The following list is not yet complete.

- 1800-1810 Franz Müller
- 1810-1819 Nikolaus Stauff
- 1819-1831 Johannes Dettweiler
- 1831-1837 Johannes Mundorff
- 1838-1843 Johannes Dettweiler
- 1843-1862 Friedrich Diehl
- 1862-1871 Jakob Engel
- 1871-1884 Christian Fauth
- 1884-1922 Johannes Müller
- Jakob Kratz
- until 1945 Johann Hahn
- 1945-1946 Georg Müller
- 1946-1964 Albert Stauff
- 1964-1999 Werner Pfister
- 1999-2001 U. Vogt, resigned at Easter 2001
- 2001–2014 Adolf Gardt
- 2014–present Sascha Leonhardt

=== Coat of arms ===
The municipality's arms might be described thus: Azure a fleur-de-lis argent between two mullets of five in chief of the same.

== Culture and sightseeing ==
=== Museums ===
There is a local history museum at the Bürgerhaus (“Citizens’ House” – a community centre, formerly the lordly manor of the Commandry) headed by Werner Pfister. Opening times are by arrangement. In 2002, the Ober-Flörsheim local history and cultural club was founded, which has since acquired about 80 members.

=== Music ===
Besides the Sängerkranz (“Singer Wreath”) men's singing club established in 1855, which despite being called a “men’s” singing club also has a women's choir, there are also the Catholic Church music club established in 1912, and an Evangelical church choir.

=== Buildings ===
Saint Peter's and Saint Paul's Catholic Parish Church (Pfarrkirche St. Peter und Paul) was built in 1776 and 1777 on the spot where once stood the old parish church. That one was assigned to followers of the Reformed Church at the time of the Palatine Church Sharing in 1705. The Teutonic Knights however, who held the patronage for the Catholic parish, opposed the decision and waged a long legal battle for ownership for the Catholics. Meanwhile, as a result of the disagreements, the old church was falling apart, making it necessary to build the new Renaissance building that stands now. The belltower was built onto the church only in 1930.

=== Sport ===
The TSG 1863 Ober-Flörsheim (sport club) offers, among other things, gymnastics, partner dancing, taekwondo, tennis and football.

== Famous people ==
=== Sons and daughters of the town ===
- Sebastian Walter, b. 1848, d. 1922 in Milwaukee, manufacturer (emigrated to Milwaukee in 1866)
- Willy Deutschmann, b. 1880, d. 1960 in Petersbächel, painter, was active in Petersbächel in the Wasgau (Alsace border region in Rhineland-Palatinate). He is said to be the most important painter of the central Wasgau.
