= Erbes-Büdesheim =

- Municipality
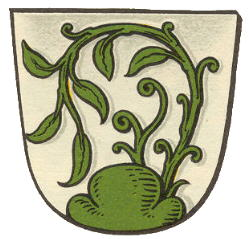
- Coat of arms

- Location of Erbes-Büdesheim within Alzey-Worms district
- Interactive map of Erbes-Büdesheim
- Location within Germany Location within Rhineland-Palatinate
- Coordinates: 49°45′16″N 8°1′53″E
- Country: Germany
- State: Rhineland-Palatinate
- District: Alzey-Worms
- Municipal assoc.: Alzey-Land

Government
  - Mayor (2019–24): Karlheinz Tovar

Area
  - Total: 10.16 km^{2} (3.92 sq mi)
- Elevation: 250 m (820 ft)

Population (2025-12-31)
  - Total: 1,479
  - Density: 145.6/km^{2} (377.0/sq mi)
- Time zone: UTC+01:00 (CET)
  - Summer (DST): UTC+02:00 (CEST)
- Postal codes: 55234
- Dialling codes: 06731
- Vehicle registration: AZ
- Website: www.erbes-buedesheim.de

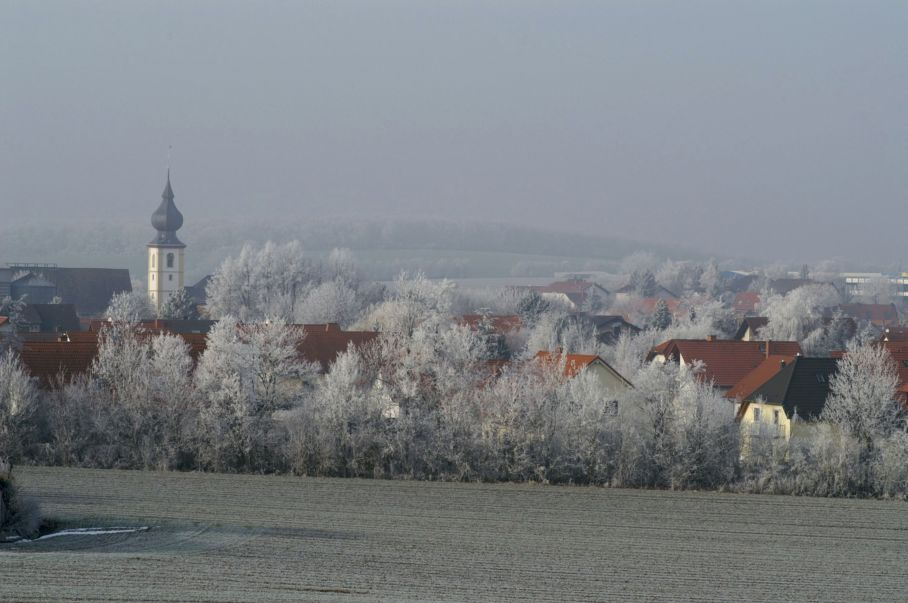
Erbes-Büdesheim in January 2006

Erbes-Büdesheim is an Ortsgemeinde – a municipality belonging to a Verbandsgemeinde, a kind of collective municipality – in the Alzey-Worms district in Rhineland-Palatinate, Germany.

== Geography ==
=== Location ===
West of Alzey, in Rhenish Hesse, at an elevation of 250 m lies Erbes-Büdesheim, a place marked by distinctive geological features, botanical singularities and a great number of surprising historical facts. It belongs to the Verbandsgemeinde of Alzey-Land, whose seat is in Alzey.

=== Geology ===
In terms of Earth's history, the village lies on what the geologists call the Vorholz Peninsula, which some 40 to 30 million years ago almost always rose up out of the sea.

== History ==
As long ago as the New Stone Age (4500–1800 BC), this place was settled, and likewise in the early (700–450 BC) and late Iron Age (450 - 15 BC), as shown by many finds. There was also settlement in Roman times, and unearthed in 1909 was a whole Frankish burial ground.

The place where Erbes-Büdesheim now lies was therefore settled through a great length of time – albeit likely with interruptions. On 2 to 4 January 767, the village had its first documentary mention, and likewise the then-standing village church, Saint Michael's (Michaels-Kirche) between 767 and 768. The first inhabitant whose name is known was one Egilolf, who on the date mentioned sold Lorsch Abbey, which stood on the river Rhine across from Worms, ten Joch (about 3.5 ha) of cropland, for which he received one horse. To this faithful, precise noting of this sale by the monks, Erbes-Büdesheim owes its first documentary mention, and likewise, almost all Rhenish Hesse's villages had their first documentary mention in such a way.

=== 12th to 13th century ===
Fully 37 monasteries and noble families had landholdings in the village in the centuries that followed, and were therefore the landlords. The history of the local lords is quite complicated. Erbes-Büdesheim originally wholly belonged as a village about 1275 to the County of Leiningen, beginning in 1350 to the “Further” and “Hinder” County of Sponheim, whose main holdings lay in the Hunsrück, and after the House of Sponheim died out in 1437, to their heirs: the County of Palatinate-Simmern, the Margraviate of Baden and Electoral Palatinate. From 1559 to 1598 and from 1611 to 1673, it belonged to the Duchy of Palatinate-Simmern, a small Electoral Palatinate sideline whose seat was in Simmern, and beginning in 1673, wholly to Electoral Palatinate.

Among the village's peculiarities are the ancient stone crosses on Offenheimer Straße and Nacker Straße (streets), the former lake in the municipal area's east to which field names still refer, the Eicherwald (forest) in the northwest and its very ancient lot division, the quicksilver mine in the far northwest below the Eicherwald and the gallows in the east at the municipal limit with Heimersheim (an outlying centre of Alzey).

=== 14th to 15th century ===
The village itself was safeguarded against attack by the Late Middle Ages, girded as it was by its village wall, which also had before it a water-filled dyke and an earthen berm overgrown with elm trees. The Obertor (Upper Gate) in the south and the Untertor (Lower Gate) in the north kept the village safe.

Erbes-Büdesheim is notable for having had two castles, the Weißes Schloss in the south and the Blaue Burg in the northwest.

- The Weißes Schloss in the south with its thus far 32 owners had already been built by 1354, at which time the knight Dietz Birkenfelder from Fürfeld lived there, and thereafter and for a long time the family of the Lords of Morsheim (Morschheim).
- The Blaue Burg in the northwest between the end of Pankratiushofstraße and Grabengasse, of which only two tower remnants are still standing today, was built before 1488, and quite likely destroyed in 1504 in the Landshut War of Succession. The plot of land known as Das blaue Schloss at the west end of Niedergasse belonged, as it were, as a bailey, to the Blaue Burg. Near this “Blue Castle” was a prison in 1590, which earlier (1533–1560) had been known as a Stock (“staff”, “stick” or “trunk”).

The Untere Kirchgasse (“Lower Church Lane”) was also called Hundsgasse, not after a dog (Hund in German), but rather after one Hundo, a prison official, who might well have been the one to lead condemned prisoners, who were imprisoned in the village's west end, along the Hundsgasse to the gallows in the east.

Three little outlying villages once stood around Erbes-Büdesheim, and their land areas were later annexed by Erbes-Büdesheim. They were Aulheim in the north, Eyche in the northwest and Riede (also called Rode) in the west. Aulheim had its Saint Nicholas's Chapel and two mills that still stand today, and Eyche a church in which the Catholics from Nack worshipped and had a priest to look after their spiritual needs. As for Riede, the names of some buildings and plots of land are still known, as are two inhabitants’ names.

=== 16th to 18th century ===
The village of Nack itself had its first documentary mention in 1304. It had two well known estates, the Antoniterhof (also called Thöngeshof or Pfalzhof) and the Hunolsteiner Hof, the latter of which belonged to the Vogt of Hunolstein and formed a stone-marked domain unto itself, meaning that it was not under Nack's authority. In the village's southwest lay the quicksilver mine, Karlsgrube (also called Karlsglück), from which in 1774 another 355 Pfund (old German pounds) of the liquid metal was brought to light. Although Nack was said to be a part of Erbes-Büdesheim until 1821 and only became politically autonomous in 1822, acquiring its own mayor, the place already had Schultheißen in the 18th century.

Erbes-Büdesheim has experienced, like most Rhenish-Hessian villages, many hardships and much sorrow, but has also had some brighter and noteworthy times. In the Landshut War of Succession in 1504 and 1505, it was partly burnt down. In the time of the Thirty Years' War it was likely completely emptied of people. After this great war, many Reformed, but also some Catholic, foreigners were brought in from Switzerland, the Netherlands, Belgium and the Lower Rhine region under Charles I Louis, Elector Palatine’s population policies.

=== 19th to 20th century ===
Raised above the neighbouring villages as it was by its general location and special past, Erbes-Büdesheim was declared the seat of a subdivision of the Oberamt of Alzey. As for schooling, there was already in the 16th century an Evangelical teacher in the village, and beginning in the 18th century, there was also a Catholic one. While the 19th century saw only three teachers serve at the Evangelical school in 80 years, the Catholic school went through 21 different teachers in the same timespan. As of 1934, a Christian “simultaneous” school (that is, one shared by more than one denomination) replaced the two separate denominational schools that had existed until then. It was put into service under headteacher Böhler in 1954.

==== From 1950 onwards ====
The municipality of Erbes-Büdesheim, like many in Rhenish Hesse, has undergone a great shift since the 1950s not only in its structure but also in its outlook. If the municipality was still strongly characterized by agriculture after the Second World War until the 1960s, that is now rather outweighed by its residential character. Although in the 1950s there were still 50 or so independent agricultural businesses, there are now only three whose main business is agriculture and a few other businesses that have it as a sideline.

Agriculture's hallmark, both before and after the two world wars, was the state-owned farm, the Staatsdomäne. By 1950, roughly 60 workers were still employed at this model operation, which was the model for many agricultural businesses, and whose way of working the local farmers adopted as their own. Seed breeding, swine and cattle raising, dairy farming and a distillery showed how multifaceted the Schlossgut, as it was popularly known locally, was.

Ten teams of horses and two of oxen performed a considerable part of the fieldwork. The workers’ hours were set at Mondays to Saturdays from 7:00 to 11:00 and from 13:00 to 19:00. One peculiarity even for that time was the way the workers met at the Catholic Church (Katzenpumpe) and then walked together to work. Skilled agricultural workers received not only their wages, but also, each year, a payment in kind, which was a whole range of farm goods such as 30 hundredweight of potatoes, five sacks of grain, two piglets, five hundredweight of straw, one are of clover and also a 40-German-mark bonus.

The Staatsdomäne was run at the beginning of the 20th century first by Erwin Römer, and after his death by his wife Nelly, and then until the end of the Second World War by Dr. Carl-Heinrich Roemer. Thereafter, Adolf Hartmann and, beginning in 1965 Joachim Hechler were the farm's leaseholders. For almost half a century – from 1904 to 1950 – Josef Huckle was the farm's governor. The state of Rhineland-Palatinate sold the Staatsdomäne in 1996, thereby ending the model agricultural operation's proud history.

Both cropland and vineyards amounting to 47 ha were turned over. There was a great deal of work in this time for the chairman of the Teilnehmergemeinschaft (an association of landowners involved in a Flurbereinigung project) Ernst Hirschel and the surveyor Emma Huckle to perform. The longsighted decision was to plant 37 continuous kilometres of windbreaking hedgerows, which today shape not only the municipal area but also the microclimate. Because this set of hedgerows in Rhenish Hesse was so noteworthy, the project was featured at the 1992 Berlin International Grüne Woche (“Green Week”). Another forward-looking decision in the course of Flurbereinigung was the building of a bypass road in 1960 and 1961. Ten ares of cropland were made available for this. In 1954, on Nacker Straße (“Nack Road”) came the new school building's dedication, thereby solving the unsatisfactory situation that had seen various school locations in use. In this, Heinrich Böhler, who for more than 40 years played a leading rôle in shaping the school scene, was decisively involved.

During Mayor Christian Wilhelm Lawall's time in office, Erbes-Büdesheim became one of the last municipalities in Rhenish Hesse to acquire a public water supply, in 1963, and also relatively late, in 1992, the municipality acquired a sewer system.

Josef Seitner shaped the economic life in the municipality quite decisively. It was he who seized the moment after the Second World War and began producing pumice and hollow concrete blocks and dealing wholesale in building materials. After this, he turned to the then new industry of ready-mix concrete. Also showing his versatility was his success in plastics processing. His efforts brought many Erbes-Büdesheimers jobs near home.

=== Religion ===
Saint Michael's Church (Michaelskirche) in Erbes-Büdesheim suddenly became Saint Bartholomew's Church (Bartholomäuskirche) in 1431. With the coming of the Protestant Reformation, which swept across almost the whole of Germany, the village became thoroughly Evangelical about 1559, first Lutheran and then beginning in 1598 Reformed. The church, rectory and school thereby belonged to the Evangelical parish. Only in the wake of the Thirty Years' War, in the time when new settlers were brought in, did Catholics once again come to the village, alongside other, Evangelical, settlers. The Roman Catholic parish was newly founded only in 1686 by Father Christoph Lautenbach. In the wake of the 1706 Palatine Church Sharing (Pfälzische Kirchenteilung, whereby Protestants had to share their churches with Catholics), the available church along with the rectory and school were transferred to the Catholic parish. Even so, the church was by this time in a wretched state, and a new Catholic church had to be built. This was done between 1736 and 1745 by the well known master builder Caspar Valerius. The Reformed parish held its services at the town hall from 1707 to 1734, until their new church was built under the Reverend Johann Christoph Steymann from Ensheim. Since the Evangelical clergyman could no longer live in Erbes-Büdesheim as of 1697, he moved to Ensheim and ministered to the Evangelical parish of Erbes-Büdesheim with Nack from Ensheim, building a strong – and now almost forgotten – relationship between Erbes-Büdesheim and Ensheim, at least in Evangelical ecclesiastical matters.

Between 1701 and 1748 there was a small Mennonite community in Erbes-Büdesheim which held its services at the Weißes Schloss, a sign of the ecumenical, tolerant mindset of the Huguenot von Rochow (until 1729) or de la Roche (1729–1788) family, who owned the castle at the time, and who were Reformed.

Moreover, Erbes-Büdesheim also had a small Jewish community, and might have as early as the 16th century. It had a small graveyard in the south part of the Blaues Schloss, and beginning in 1840 a new one in the village's northeast. Even a synagogue room was available on Niedergasse (lane).

== Politics ==
=== Municipal council ===
The council is made up of 16 council members who were elected at the municipal election held on 7 June 2009, and the honorary mayor as chairman.

The municipal election held on 7 June 2009 yielded the following results:

| | CDU | FWG | Total |
| 2009 | 10 | 6 | 16 seats |
| 2004 | 10 | 6 | 16 seats |

=== Town partnerships ===
- Maurepas-Leforest, Somme, France

== Culture and sightseeing ==
=== Museums ===
- Rheinhessisches Postmuseum in the former post office on the town hall's ground floor

=== Sport ===
- Kneipp basin at Weedeplatz, part of the Kneipp-Napoleon hiking trail
- Schützenverein Erbes-Büdesheim (shooting club)
- 1. Taekwondo-Club Erbes-Büdesheim

=== Regular events ===
- Kermis (church consecration festival, locally known as the Kerb) on the next to last weekend in August

== Economy and infrastructure ==
=== Established businesses ===
- Raiffeisenkasse Erbes-Büdesheim und Umgebung eG (financial institution)

== Famous people ==
=== Sons and daughters of the town ===
- Marie Luise Neunecker, musician, horn player
- Heinz-Hermann Schnabel, politician, mayor, Member of the Landtag
