= Bornheim (Rheinhessen) =

- Municipality
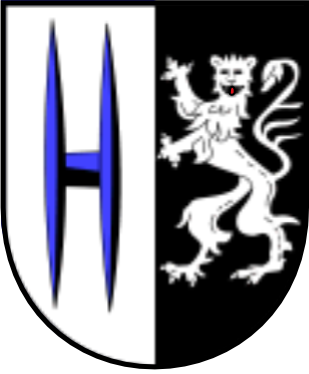
- Coat of arms

- Location of Bornheim within Alzey-Worms district
- Interactive map of Bornheim
- Location within Germany Location within Rhineland-Palatinate
- Coordinates: 49°46′59″N 8°3′37″E
- Country: Germany
- State: Rhineland-Palatinate
- District: Alzey-Worms
- Municipal assoc.: Alzey-Land

Government
  - Mayor (2019–24): Renate Steingaß

Area
  - Total: 4.45 km^{2} (1.72 sq mi)
- Elevation: 177 m (581 ft)

Population (2025-12-31)
  - Total: 864
  - Density: 194/km^{2} (503/sq mi)
- Time zone: UTC+01:00 (CET)
  - Summer (DST): UTC+02:00 (CEST)
- Postal codes: 55237
- Dialling codes: 06734
- Vehicle registration: AZ

Bornheim (German pronunciation: [ˈbɔʁnhaɪm]) is an Ortsgemeinde – a municipality belonging to a Verbandsgemeinde, a kind of collective municipality – in the Alzey-Worms district in Rhineland-Palatinate, Germany. It is known as the "Gateway to the Rhenish-Hessian Switzerland", as the region is called.

== Geography ==
=== Location ===
Bornheim is nestled in a hollow, sheltered by the Oswaldshöhe (heights). The municipality lies in Rhenish Hesse.

Its main winemaking appellation – Weingroßlage – is Adelberg.

== History ==
In 767 or 768, Bornheim had its first documentary mention in a donation document from Lorsch Abbey. Archaeological finds, however, make it clear that the village existed earlier. Graves for cremated remains and a Frankish row graveyard from about AD 500 have been found in the municipality. The Oswaldshöhe is thought to have served as an early gathering place for Germanic peoples.

The church was first mentioned in 1241 and partly destroyed by French troops in 1690. The tower with its wall paintings from the 13th century, however, remained standing. It also houses Rhenish Hesse’s oldest bell.

Like the surrounding municipalities, Bornheim belonged to the Waldgraves in the Early Middle Ages, and beginning in 1671 to their kin, the Rheingrafen ("Rhine Counts"). After the Napoleonic Wars, the municipality passed, as part of Rhenish Hesse, to the Grand Duchy of Hesse-Darmstadt.

On 31 December 1871 the railway arrived. Passenger service on the Armsheim – Bornheim – Flonheim – Wendelsheim line (Wiesbachtalbahn) was ended in 1966, and since then the line has been completely abandoned.

After the First World War, French troops built a munitions depot right next to the railway line.

In the Second World War, several bombs fell in the local area, which did no major damage.

After 1961, Bornheim became known as the "Village of Roses and Wine". At this time, 5,000 climbing roses were planted.

The municipality’s favourable location for transport, having its own interchange on the A 61, and the affordable property prices have led to quick growth over the last few years, such that there are now 825 inhabitants (as at 31 December 2006).

== Politics ==
=== Municipal council ===
The council is made up of 12 council members, who are elected by majority vote, and the honorary mayor as chairman.

=== Mayor ===
- Bernhard Beck (2004–2014)
- Renate Steingaß (2014–present)

== Culture and sightseeing ==
=== Buildings ===
- Church, tower from about 1200, with wall paintings from the 13th century, and Stumm organ (music)
- Village fountain
- Old well pump

== Economy and infrastructure ==
=== Transport ===
- Bornheim Autobahn interchange (A 61)
- Landesstraße (state road) 408
