= Kettenheim =

- Municipality
- Coat of arms

- Location of Kettenheim within Alzey-Worms district
- Interactive map of Kettenheim
- Location within Germany Location within Rhineland-Palatinate
- Coordinates: 49°43′18″N 08°06′48″E
- Country: Germany
- State: Rhineland-Palatinate
- District: Alzey-Worms
- Municipal assoc.: Alzey-Land

Government
  - Mayor (2019–24): Wilfried Busch

Area
  - Total: 3.47 km^{2} (1.34 sq mi)
- Elevation: 209 m (686 ft)

Population (2025-12-31)
  - Total: 314
  - Density: 90.5/km^{2} (234/sq mi)
- Time zone: UTC+01:00 (CET)
  - Summer (DST): UTC+02:00 (CEST)
- Postal codes: 55234
- Dialling codes: 06731
- Vehicle registration: AZ
- Website: www.alzey-land.de

Kettenheim (German pronunciation: [ˈkɛtn̩haɪm]) is an Ortsgemeinde – a municipality belonging to a Verbandsgemeinde, a kind of collective municipality – in the Alzey-Worms district in Rhineland-Palatinate, Germany.

== Geography ==
=== Location ===
The municipality lies in Rhenish Hesse and belongs to the Verbandsgemeinde of Alzey-Land, whose seat is in Alzey.

== History ==
Earlier known as Kiedenheim, the village lay in the lower Nahegau (a county) and for a great length of time was subservient to the castle at Alzey. The family Dieter von Kiedenheim was enfeoffed with great holdings by Ruprecht III. Northeast of Kettenheim lay the village of Egersheim or Ergisheim which later vanished, most likely shortly after the Thirty Years' War.

== Politics ==
=== Town council ===
The council is made up of 8 council members, who were elected by majority vote at the municipal election held on 7 June 2009, and the honorary mayor as chairman.

=== Coat of arms ===
The municipality's arms might be described thus: Argent diapered on a pale azure a chain sable.

Both the external links for Kettenheim, however, show a different coat of arms, this one with the diapering missing from the field and with the chain arranged in a horseshoe shape over the field, centred on the pale, instead of running lengthwise along it. No explanation of the municipality's arms is given at either site. Nevertheless, Ketten means “chains” in German.

== Culture and sightseeing ==
=== Buildings ===
The town hall is from 1686 and has richly carved timber framing and oriel windows built onto a single hall.

The Hessensteiger Mühle is made of two properties, both former watermills.

Hessensteiger Mühle I: Proof of this mill's existence can be found through entries of christenings, births and so on in the church books since at least 1570, before which it likely belonged to Weidas Monastery in Dautenheim (now an outlying centre of Alzey), thereby meaning that it could indeed be much older.

Hessensteiger Mühle II: Proof of this mill's existence goes back to 1840 in a fire survey in the Town of Alzey archives.

The mills stand at the municipal limits with Alzey-Dautenheim underneath the Dautenheim Autobahn valley viaduct.
