= Bechenheim =

- Municipality
- Coat of arms

- Location of Bechenheim within Alzey-Worms district
- Interactive map of Bechenheim
- Location within Germany Location within Rhineland-Palatinate
- Coordinates: 49°44′N 8°0′E
- Country: Germany
- State: Rhineland-Palatinate
- District: Alzey-Worms
- Municipal assoc.: Alzey-Land

Government
  - Mayor (2019–24): Ute Stein

Area
  - Total: 2.55 km^{2} (0.98 sq mi)
- Elevation: 224 m (735 ft)

Population (2025-12-31)
  - Total: 421
  - Density: 165/km^{2} (428/sq mi)
- Time zone: UTC+01:00 (CET)
  - Summer (DST): UTC+02:00 (CEST)
- Postal codes: 55234
- Dialling codes: 06736
- Vehicle registration: AZ
- Website: www.bechenheim.de

Bechenheim (German pronunciation: [ˈbɛçn̩haɪm]) is an Ortsgemeinde – a municipality belonging to a Verbandsgemeinde, a kind of collective municipality – in the Alzey-Worms district in Rhineland-Palatinate, Germany. It belongs to the Verbandsgemeinde of Alzey-Land, whose seat is in Alzey.

== Geography ==
=== Location ===
As a winegrowing centre, Bechenheim lies in Germany's biggest winegrowing district, in the southwest of Rhenish Hesse. Bechenheim is Rhenish Hesse's highest winegrowing municipality.

== History ==
In 824, Bechenheim had its first documentary mention in a document from Fulda Abbey.

== Politics ==
=== Municipal council ===
The council is made up of 8 council members and the honorary mayor as chairman. The municipal election held on 7 June 2009 yielded the following results:

Year	SPD	FWG	Total
2009	5	3	8 seats
2004	3	5	8 seats

=== Coat of arms ===
The municipality's arms might be described thus: Gules a dexter arm embowed armed argent, the hand naked of the same and holding a beaker Or.

== Economy and infrastructure ==
=== Winegrowing ===
Bechenheim belongs to the “Wonnegau Winegrowing Area” (Weinbaubereich Wonnegau) in Rhenish Hesse. Active in the municipality are six winegrowing businesses with 33 ha of vineyard under cultivation. Some 76% of the wine made there is white varieties (as at 2007). In 1979, 22 such businesses were still running, and vineyards covered 32 ha.
