= Framersheim =

- Municipality
- Coat of arms

- Location of Framersheim within Alzey-Worms district
- Interactive map of Framersheim
- Location within Germany Location within Rhineland-Palatinate
- Coordinates: 49°45′29″N 8°10′27″E
- Country: Germany
- State: Rhineland-Palatinate
- District: Alzey-Worms
- Municipal assoc.: Alzey-Land

Government
  - Mayor (2019–24): Felix Schmidt

Area
  - Total: 9.31 km^{2} (3.59 sq mi)
- Elevation: 171 m (561 ft)

Population (2025-12-31)
  - Total: 1,557
  - Density: 167/km^{2} (433/sq mi)
- Time zone: UTC+01:00 (CET)
  - Summer (DST): UTC+02:00 (CEST)
- Postal codes: 55234
- Dialling codes: 06733
- Vehicle registration: AZ
- Website: www.framersheim.de

Framersheim is an Ortsgemeinde – a municipality belonging to a Verbandsgemeinde, a kind of collective municipality – in the Alzey-Worms district in Rhineland-Palatinate, Germany.

== Geography ==
=== Location ===
The municipality lies in Rhenish Hesse. It belongs to the Verbandsgemeinde of Alzey-Land, whose seat is in Alzey.

=== Neighbouring municipalities ===
Framersheim's neighbours are Alzey-Schafhausen, Dittelsheim-Heßloch, Gau-Heppenheim and Gau-Odernheim.

== History ==
In 775, Framersheim had its first documentary mention when a document from Lorsch Abbey mentioned a vineyard in Framersheim.

== Politics ==
=== Municipal council ===
The council is made up of 16 council members, who were elected at the municipal election held on 7 June 2009, and the honorary mayor as chairman.

The municipal election held on 7 June 2009 yielded the following results:

	SPD	CDU	FWG	Zink	Total
2009	4	2	7	3	16 seats

=== Mayors ===
- (1945–1946) Johann Beckenbach
- (1989–2004) Frank Zink
- (2004–2019) Ulrich Armbrüster
- (2019–today) Felix Schmidt

=== Coat of arms ===
The municipality's arms might be described thus: Sable a kettle-hat argent pierced each side with a cord gules, itself nowed at each end and looped once in base.

The “kettle-hat” (Kesselhut in German) apparently was once typical. It appeared in the village seal as early as 1459. It could be a canting charge for the family Kessler von Sarmsheim who held the local castle in the Middle Ages.

== Economy and infrastructure ==
With local winemaking businesses, business is done by so-called self-marketers, who mostly market their own wares directly to end users.
