= Morschheim =

- Municipality
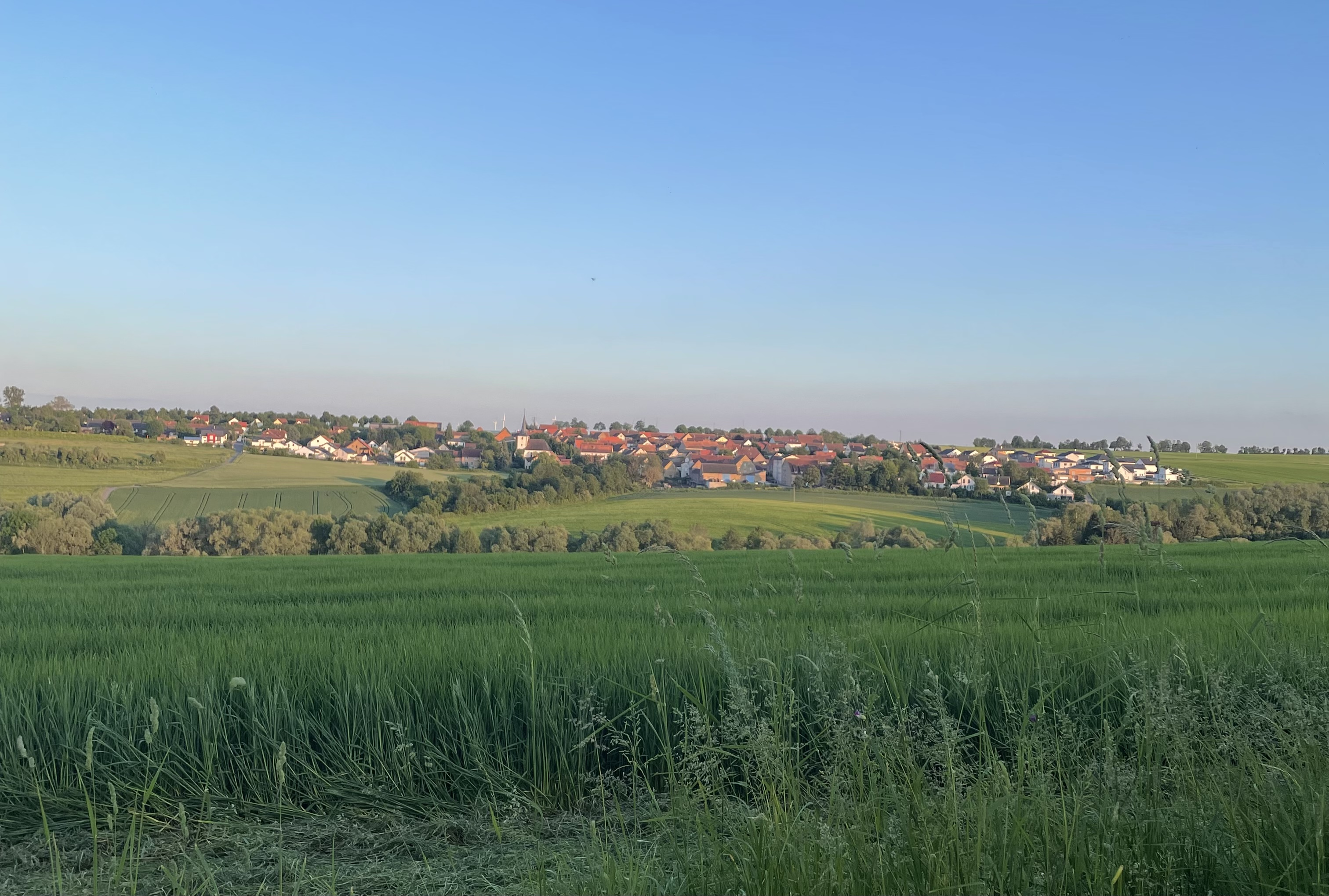
- View from the north

- Coat of arms

- Location of Morschheim within Donnersbergkreis district
- Interactive map of Morschheim
- Location within Germany Location within Rhineland-Palatinate
- Coordinates: 49°41′53″N 8°01′29″E
- Country: Germany
- State: Rhineland-Palatinate
- District: Donnersbergkreis
- Municipal assoc.: Kirchheimbolanden

Government
  - Mayor (2019–24): Timo Markus Wahl

Area
  - Total: 6.51 km^{2} (2.51 sq mi)
- Elevation: 302 m (991 ft)

Population (2025-12-31)
  - Total: 768
  - Density: 118/km^{2} (306/sq mi)
- Time zone: UTC+01:00 (CET)
  - Summer (DST): UTC+02:00 (CEST)
- Postal codes: 67294
- Dialling codes: 06352
- Vehicle registration: KIB

Morschheim (German pronunciation: [ˈmɔʁʃhaɪm]) is a municipality in the Donnersbergkreis district, in Rhineland-Palatinate, Germany.

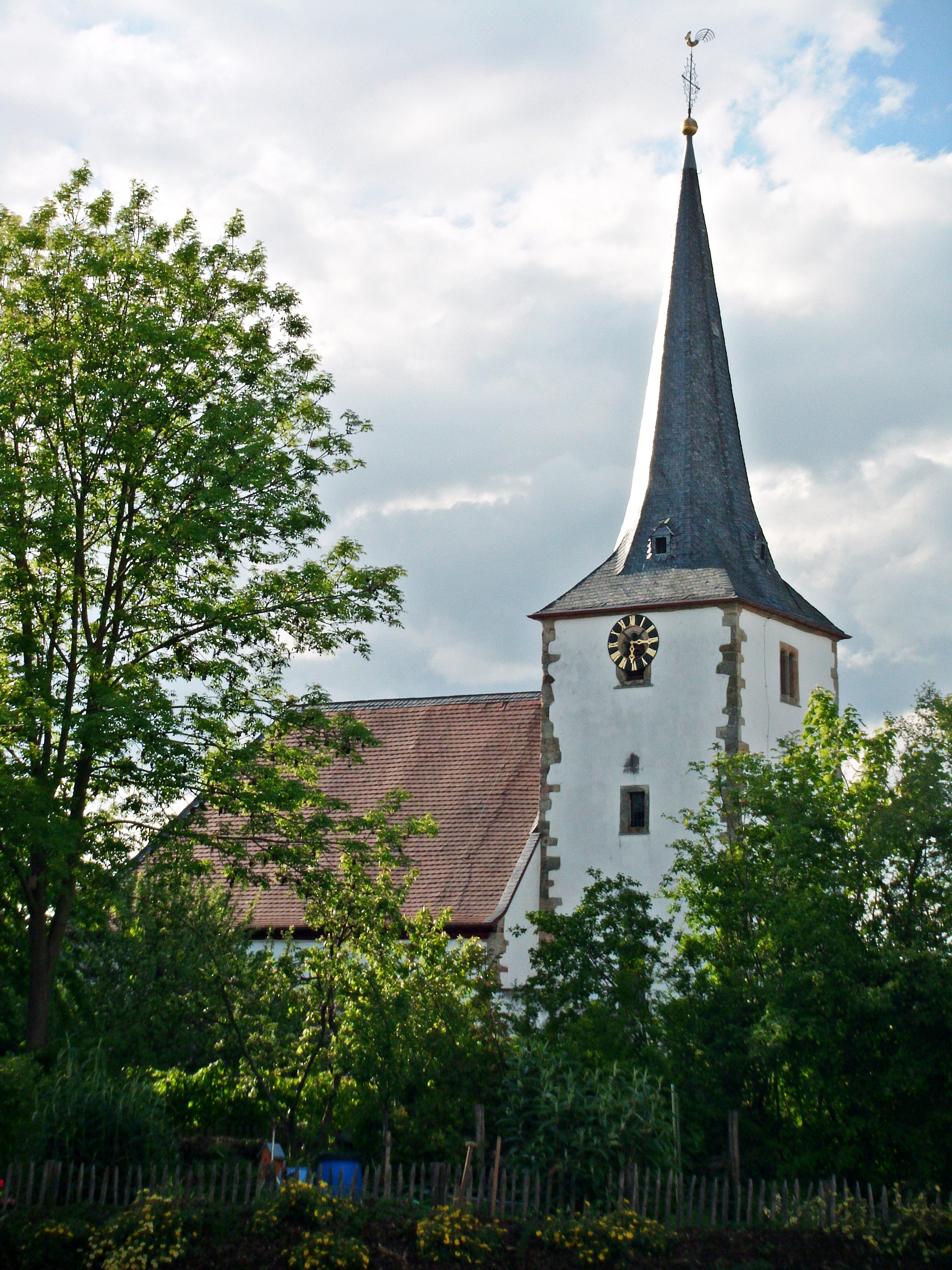
protestant church

== Geography ==
=== Location ===
The village is located in the Selz valley at the border of the Palatinate and Rhenish Hesse. It borders Offenheim, Mauchenheim, Freimersheim, Ilbesheim, Bischheim, Kirchheimbolanden and Orbis.

Besides the village proper, the inhabited places Am Steinernen Berg and Bahnhof Morschheim (Morschheim station) are part of the municipality.

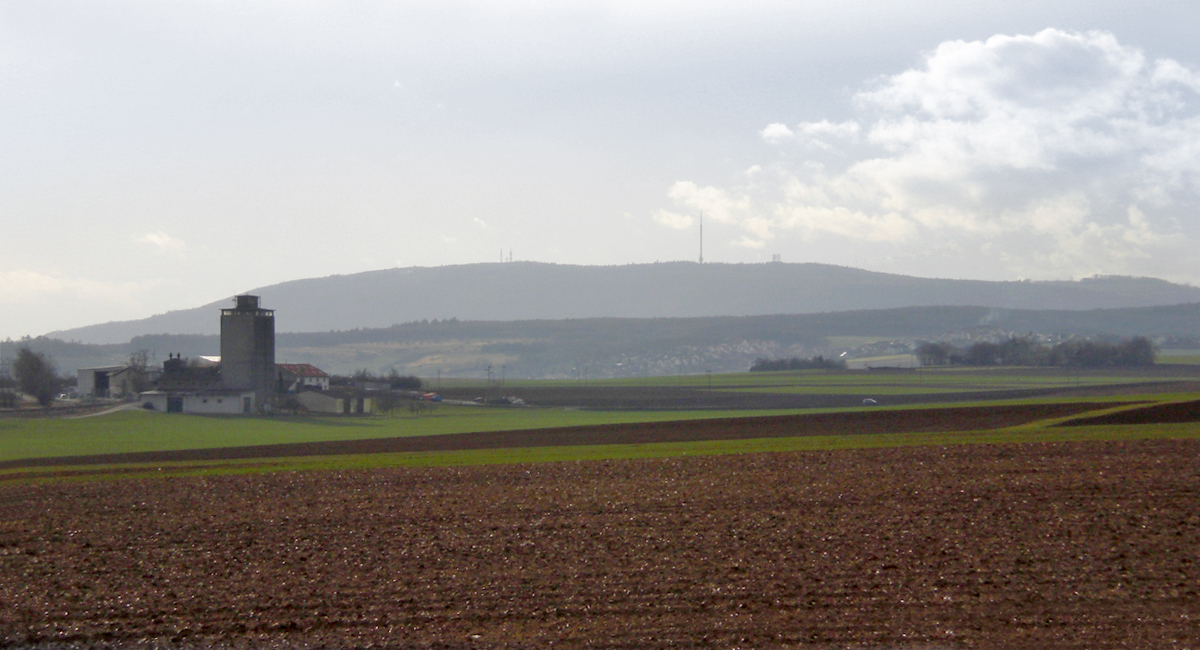
Donnersberg and Morschheim Bahnhof (front left)

=== Climate ===
The weather is mostly sunny and warm, sometimes a bit dry. This is due to Morscheim's protected location east of the Donnersberg and its altitude of 302 m (990 ft). The so called Morscheim winds from the west have negative effects.

== History ==
The oldest document mentioning Morschheim (Morscheym) is from 1157. Otterberg Abbey held estates in the village.

== Politics ==
=== Council ===
The village council is composed of 12 members who were elected in a personalized proportional representation in the local elections on June 9, 2024, and the honorary mayor as chairman.

=== Heraldry ===
The coat of arms shows Saint Maurice holding an azure shield with an argent egale. Saint Maurice is the former patron saint of the church, the eagle symbolises the Leiningen family who owned the village in medieval times.

It dates back to a 15th century seal and was granted by the State Ministry of the Interior in 1950.

== Infrastructure ==
=== Roads ===
The A63 highway runs southeast of the village. The next exits are Kirchheimbolanden (3 km) and Freimersheim (4 km).

=== Public transit ===
Morscheim had a train station along the Donnersberg Railway, that is no longer served by passenger trains. The next station is now in Kirchheimbolanden, 3 km (2 mi) away. Since June 2024 there is an hourly bus service to Alzey and Kirchheimbolanden.
