= Hans Fitting (botanist) =

Johannes (Hans) Theodor Gustav Ernst Fitting (23 April 1877, Halle an der Saale – 6 July 1970, Köln) was a German plant physiologist. He was the son of law professor Heinrich Hermann Fitting.

He studied natural sciences at the universities of Halle and Strasbourg, receiving his doctorate in 1900 as a student of Hermann zu Solms-Laubach. After graduation, he served as an assistant to Wilhelm Pfeffer at Leipzig, then worked under Hermann Vöchting at the University of Tübingen. In 1907/08 he took a study trip to Ceylon and Java, where he conducted extensive research of orchids at the botanical research center in Buitenzorg. After returning to Germany, he became an associate professor at Strasbourg, then relocated to Halle in 1910, and soon afterwards was named director of the botanical gardens at the colonial institute in Hamburg. From 1912 onward, he was a full professor of botany at the University of Bonn.

His botanical research largely dealt with subjects such as: phototropism, cellular and developmental physiology, haptotropism, and plant physiology based on geography. While studying pollination in orchids, he was the first scientist to use the term "hormone" (Pollenhormon) in connection with plants, and in doing so, suggested that plants produced hormones. This growth-promoting substance would later become identified as indole-3-acetic acid (IAA).

== Selected works ==
- Nachtrag zu August Garckes Flora von Halle, 1899 – Addendum to August Garcke's Flora von Halle.
- Untersuchungen über den Haptotropismus der Ranken, 1903 – Studies on haptotropism of tendrils.
- Lichtperzeption und phototropische Empfindlichkeit, zugleich ein Beitrag zur Lehre vom Etiolement, 1907 – Light perception and phototropic sensitivity, also contributions to the doctrine of etiolation.
- Die Pflanze als lebender Organismus; akademische Rede, 1917 – The plant as a living organism (academic reading).
- Aufgaben und Ziele einer vergleichenden Physiologie auf geographischer Grundlage, 1922 – Research of comparative physiology on a geographical basis, 1922.
- Die ökologische Morphologie der Pflanzen im Lichte neuerer physiologischer und pflanzengeographischer Forschungen, 1926 – The ecological morphology of plants in the light of recent physiological and phytogeographical research.
- Grundzüge der Vererbungslehre, 1949 – Fundamentals of genetics.

He also made contributions to Eduard Strasburger's "Lehrbuch der Botanik für Hochschulen".
