= Mauchenheim =

- Municipality
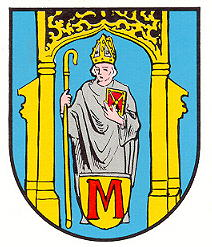
- Coat of arms

- Location of Mauchenheim within Alzey-Worms district
- Interactive map of Mauchenheim
- Location within Germany Location within Rhineland-Palatinate
- Coordinates: 49°43′05″N 08°02′46″E
- Country: Germany
- State: Rhineland-Palatinate
- District: Alzey-Worms
- Municipal assoc.: Alzey-Land

Government
  - Mayor (2019–24): Udo Arm (SPD)

Area
  - Total: 6.87 km^{2} (2.65 sq mi)
- Elevation: 299 m (981 ft)

Population (2025-12-31)
  - Total: 968
  - Density: 141/km^{2} (365/sq mi)
- Time zone: UTC+01:00 (CET)
  - Summer (DST): UTC+02:00 (CEST)
- Postal codes: 67294
- Dialling codes: 06352
- Vehicle registration: AZ
- Website: www.mauchenheim-online.de

Mauchenheim (German pronunciation: [ˈmaʊxn̩haɪm]) is an Ortsgemeinde – a municipality belonging to a Verbandsgemeinde, a kind of collective municipality – in the Alzey-Worms district in Rhineland-Palatinate, Germany.

== Geography ==
=== Location ===
The municipality lies in Rhenish Hesse and belongs to the Verbandsgemeinde of Alzey-Land, whose seat is in Alzey. Mauchenheim lies roughly 5 km from Orbis, where the river Selz rises. This brook empties into the Rhine at Ingelheim.

== History ==
Mauchenheim had its first documentary mention in 867 in a deed of donation to Lorsch Abbey. But it is proven, that there have been human settlements long before, as there are remainings of a Roman Villa Rustica below ground.

During the last centuries Mauchenheim belonged to several states and countries. Since 1777 it was part of Bavaria. From 1798 till 1814 Mauchenheim was part of France. Till 1969 it belonged to Palatinate. Today Mauchenheim lies in Rhenish Hesse and belongs to Rhineland-Palatinate.

== Politics ==
=== Municipal council ===
The council is made up of 12 council members, who were elected at the municipal election held on 7 June 2009, and the honorary mayor as chairman.

The municipal election held on 7 June 2009 yielded the following results:

	SPD	FWG	Total
2009	7	5	12 seats
2004	5	7	12 seats

=== Mayor ===
Mauchenheim's current mayor is Udo Arm.

=== Coat of arms ===
The municipality's arms might be described thus: Azure under a baldachin Or Saint Remigius as a bishop vested argent and mitred of the same garnished of the second, in his dexter hand a crozier of the second, in his sinister hand a book gules garnished of the second, at his feet an escutcheon of the second charged with the letter M of the fourth.

This is, as far as is possible, a direct translation of the German blazon (In blau unter goldenem Baldachin der heilige Remigius als Bischof in silbernem Gewand, mit goldbesetzter silberner Mitra, in der Rechten einen goldenen Krummstab, in der Linken ein goldbeschlagenes rotes Buch haltend, zu seinen Füßen ein goldener Schild, darin ein roter Majuskelbuchstabe M).

The arms were granted on 20 December 1934.

== Notable natives and residents ==
- Hermann Heinrich Fitting, journalist

== Other ==
The noble family Mauchenheim genannt Bechtolsheim (genannt means “called”) named itself after Mauchenheim.
