= Heinrich Hermann Fitting =

German jurist

Heinrich Hermann Fitting (1831–1918) was a German jurist.

== Biography ==
He was born at Mauchenheim, and studied at Würzburg, Heidelberg, and Erlangen. In 1857 he was appointed professor of Roman law at Basel, and in 1862 he was called in the same capacity to Halle. From 1864 to 1878 he was engaged in publishing the Archiv für die civilistische Praxis. He retired in 1902. He was the father of botanist Hans Fitting.

== Works ==
- Der Reichscivilprozess ("Civil procedure in the German Empire", 7th ed. 1890)
- Das Reichskonkursrecht und Konkursverfahren ("Bankruptcy law in the German Empire and bankruptcy proceedings", 2d ed. 1883)
- Die Anfänge der Rechtsschule zu Bologna ("Beginnings of a school of law in Bologna", 1888)
