= Orbis, Rhineland-Palatinate =

Orbis
- Municipality
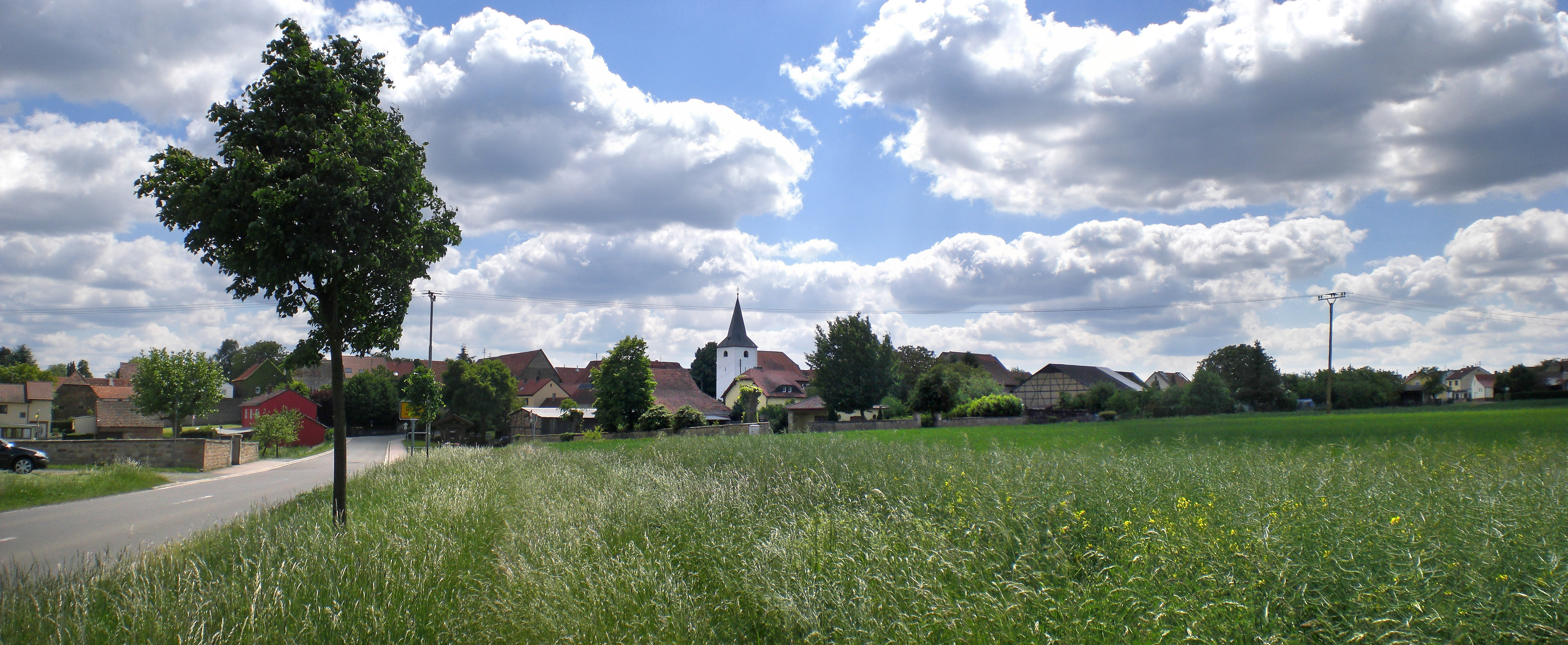

- Coat of arms

- Location of Orbis within Donnersbergkreis district
- Interactive map of Orbis
- Location within Germany Location within Rhineland-Palatinate
- Coordinates: 49°41′39.87″N 7°59′37.66″E
- Country: Germany
- State: Rhineland-Palatinate
- District: Donnersbergkreis
- Municipal assoc.: Kirchheimbolanden

Government
  - Mayor (2019–24): Peter Schmitt (SPD)

Area
  - Total: 5.68 km^{2} (2.19 sq mi)
- Elevation: 327 m (1,073 ft)

Population (2025-12-31)
  - Total: 684
  - Density: 120/km^{2} (312/sq mi)
- Time zone: UTC+01:00 (CET)
  - Summer (DST): UTC+02:00 (CEST)
- Postal codes: 67294
- Dialling codes: 06352
- Vehicle registration: KIB
- Website: www.orbis-pfalz.de

Orbis is a municipality in the Donnersbergkreis district, in Rhineland-Palatinate, Germany.

== Geography ==
Orbis is located about 40 km (25 mi) south of Mainz. It is situated in the Hills between Rhenish Hesse and the North Palatine Uplands. The Selz river has its source at the eastern edge of the village.

Neighbouring municipalities are Offenheim, Morschheim, Kirchheimbolanden and Oberwiesen.

== History ==
Until the 18th century the village was part of Nassau-Weilburg and administered from Kirchheimbolanden.

After the War of the First Coalition Orbis was occupied and later annexed by France with the Treaty of Campo Formio in 1797. From 1798 to 1814 it belonged to the French Departement du Mont-Tonnerre. After the Congress of Vienna the region was first given to Austria (1815) and later to Bavaria (1816).

On 14 June 1849 the Battle of Kirchheimbolanden took place near the village. Orbis itself was peacefully handed over to the Prussian troops.

After World War II Orbis became part of Rhineland-Palatinate (1946). Since 1969 it belongs to the Donnersbergkreis district.

== Politics ==
=== Council ===
The village council is composed of 12 members who were elected in a personalized proportional representation in the local elections on June 9, 2024, and the honorary mayor as chairman.

=== Heraldry ===
The coat of arms shows a lion, symbolising the House of Nassau-Weilburg. The two firs on the right show the entomological interpretation of Orbis' name as „dense forest“. The key stands for Saint Peter the former patron saint of the church.

== Infrastructure ==
The village is connected by minor roads. The A63 is 5 km (3 mi) to the south. Kirchheimbolanden on the Donnersberg Railway is the nearest train station to which Orbis is linked by the 420 bus line (Alzey-Kirchheimbolanden).

== People ==
- Franz Josef Heinz (1884-1924), also known as Heinz-Orbis, politician (DVP) and Palatine separatist
