= Heimersheimer Bach =

River in Germany

Location
- Country: Germany
- State: Rhineland-Palatinate
- Region: Rhenish Hesse
- Reference no.: DE: 2524

Physical characteristics
- Source
  - location: Above Alzey-Heimersheim in the parish of Entenpfuhl
  - coordinates: 49°45′19″N 8°04′18″E
  - elevation: 275 m above sea level (NHN)
- Mouth
  - location: Half a kilometre before Bechtolsheim into the Selz
  - coordinates: 49°47′54″N 8°11′18″E
  - elevation: 139 m
- Length: 10.162 km
- Basin size: 24.868 km²

Basin features
- Progression: Selz→ Rhine→ North Sea

The Heimersheimer Bach is a roughly ten-kilometre-long stream and tributary of the Selz in the German region of Rhenish Hesse.

== See also ==
- List of rivers of Rhineland-Palatinate
