= Leopold Kny =

German botanist

Carl Ignaz Leopold Kny
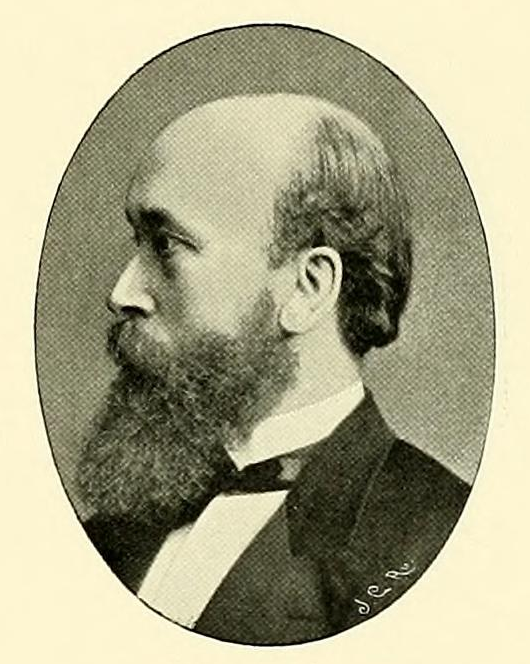
- Portrait of German botanist Leopold Kny
- Born: 6 July 1841; Breslau
- Died: 26 June 1916 (aged 74); Berlin
- Education: University of Wrocław; Ludwig-Maximilians-Universität München
- Known for: Botanical illustration
- Scientific career
- Workplaces: Friedrich Wilhelm University of Berlin
- Author abbrev. (botany): Kny

Carl Ignaz Leopold Kny (6 July 1841 – 26 June 1916) was a German botanist, notable as a specialist in research involving the morphology of fungi and cryptogams. He is best known for his production of botanical wall-charts, the Botanische Wandtafeln.

== Early life ==
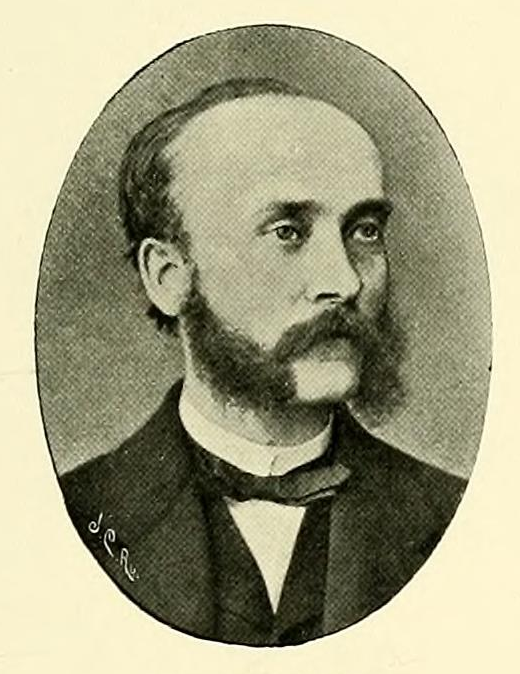
Kny aged 30

Kny was born in Breslau on 6 July 1841. At the age of 17, Kny graduated from high school and began to attend the University of Wrocław. Initially he studied business to follow his father's profession, but he was inspired by Heinrich Göppert and Ferdinand Cohn, and he decided to devote himself to the study of botany. In 1860, he took up studies at the Ludwig-Maximilians-Universität München under the direction of Carl Nägeli. He completed his doctorate at the Friedrich Wilhelm University of Berlin, where he was a pupil of Alexander Braun He studied leafless liverworts and then went to Sicily and Madeira to recover his health. He began to collect algae samples from Southern Europe for his studies. He habilitated in 1867.

== Career ==
Kny became an associate professor at the Friedrich Wilhelm University of Berlin, as well as director of the newly formed department of plant physiology in 1873. He also headed the physiology laboratory at the agricultural institute where he succeeded Hermann Karsten. Among his students at Berlin was plant physiologist Hermann Vöchting. Also in 1873, Kny became a member of the Academy of Sciences Leopoldina. In 1880, Kny accepted a position as a professor of botany at the Agricultural University of Berlin, as well as head of the botanical department at Friedrich Wilhelm University. His studies were mostly concerned with the morphology of fungi and cryptograms, especially within the Pteridaceae. Kny also was interested in vascular plants, and he investigated the effects of gravity on growth habit, the anatomy of wood, and the differences of the vascular system between monocots and dicots. In 1908, he became a full honorary professor at Friedrich Wilhelm University. He retired in 1911 but remained as an emeritus. Throughout his career, Kny made 104 publications.

Between 1874 and 1911, Kny produced his Botanische Wandtafeln. These were a series of 117 botanical wall charts known for their high level of detail, and were widely used in classrooms long after his death. They were accompanied by a 554-page textbook for explanatory purposes. Kny's wall charts are still revered today, and they are housed in several different museums.

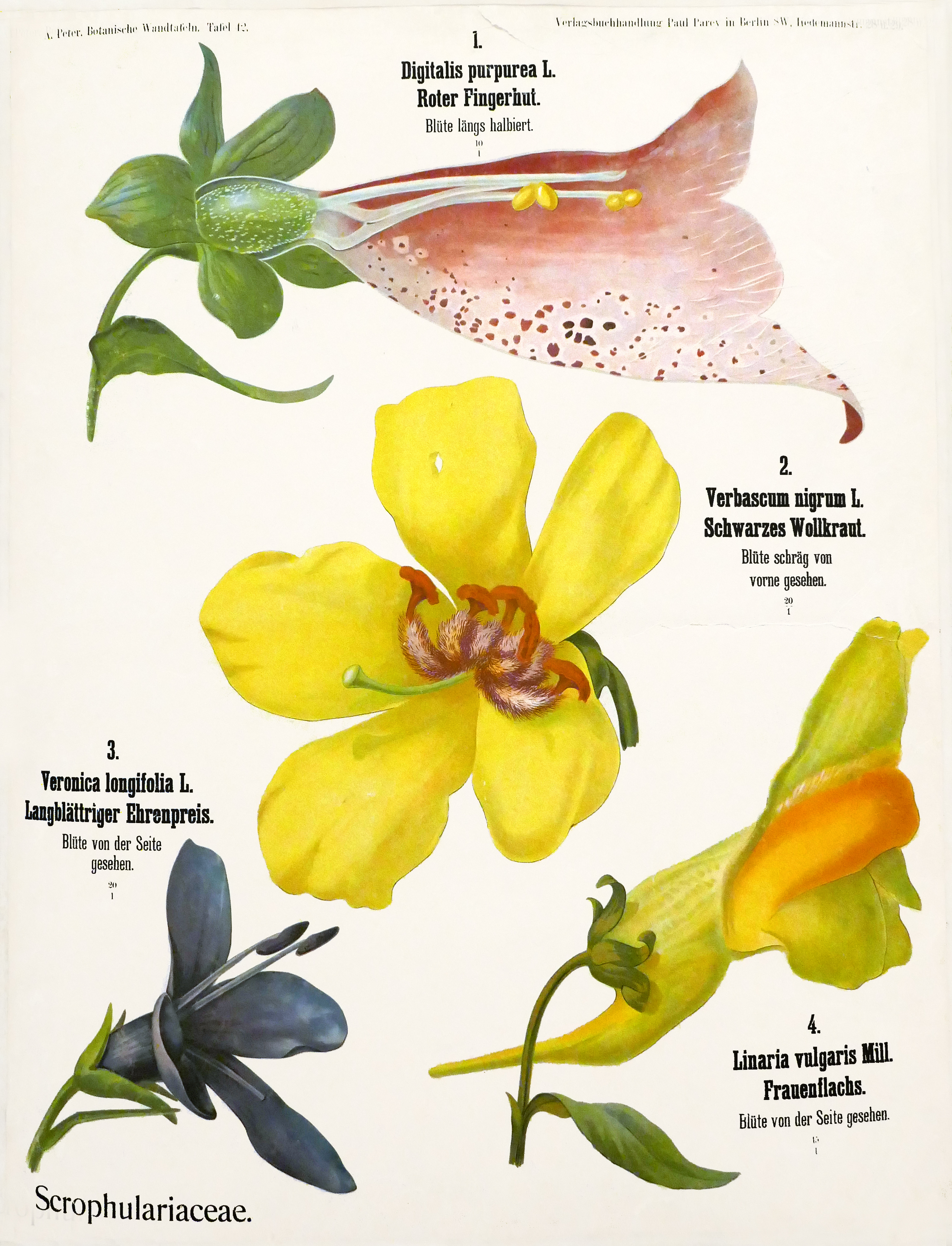
Excerpt from Botanische Wandtafeln, Scrophulariaceae

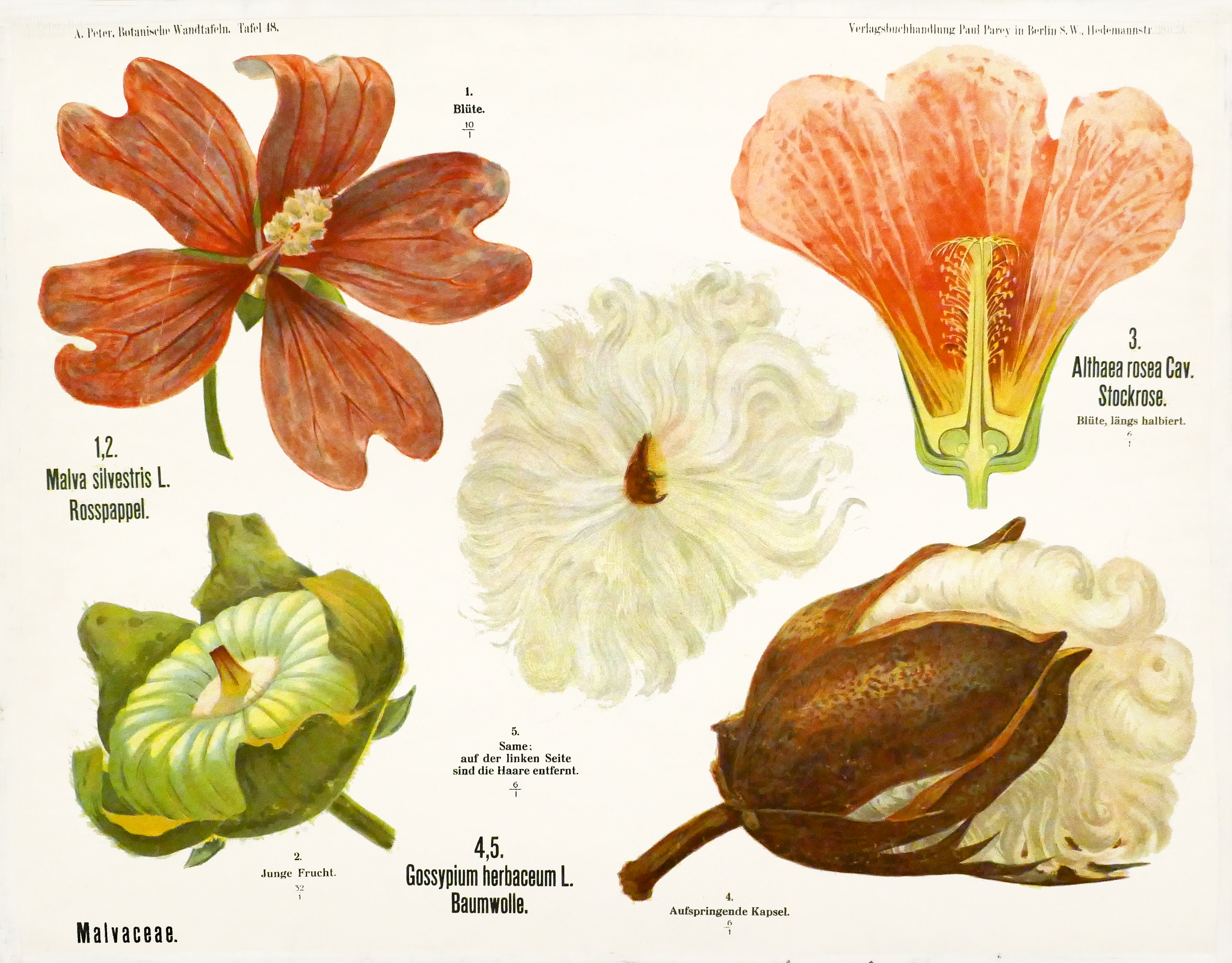
Excerpt from Botanische Wandtafeln, Malvaceae

== Legacy ==
In 1891, botanist Otto Kuntze named the genus Knyaria in his honor.

Kny's daughter, Hedwig, married Erich Klausener on 1 August 1914 in Düsseldorf.
