= Hermann Vöchting =

German botanist (1847–1917)

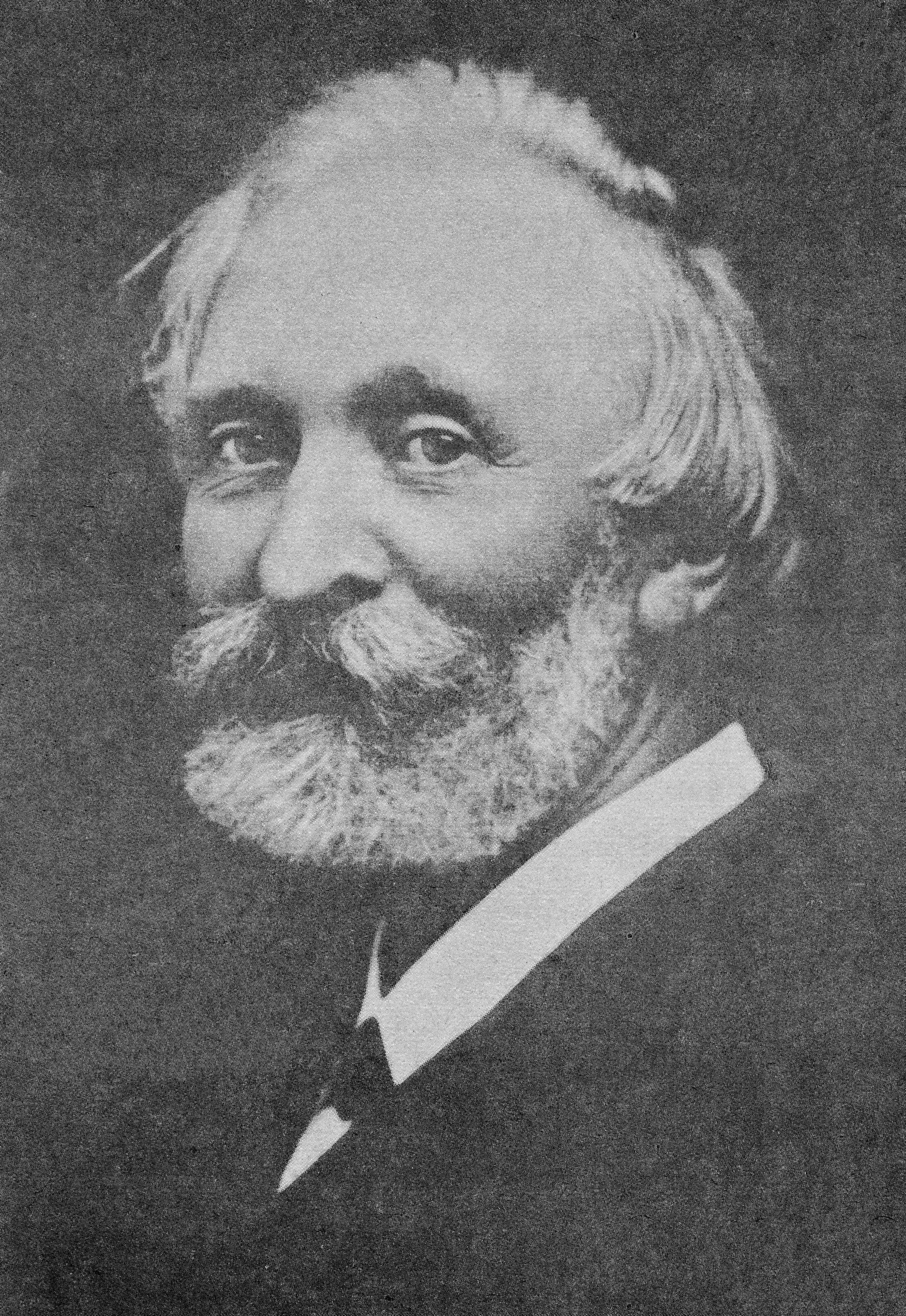
- Born: 8 February 1847; Blomberg, Germany
- Died: 24 November 1917 (aged 70); Tübingen, Germany
- Scientific career
- Fields: Botany
- Institutions: University of Basel; University of Tübingen

Hermann Vöchting (8 February 1847, Blomberg – 24 November 1917, Tübingen) was a German botanist.

He studied botany in Berlin, where he was influenced by Alexander Braun (1805–1877), Leopold Kny (1841–1916), and Nathaniel Pringsheim (1823–1894), earning his doctorate in 1873 at the University of Göttingen with a thesis on Rhipsalideae. From 1874 he worked as a lecturer at the University of Bonn, distinguishing himself with experimental studies involving plant morphology.

In 1878 he succeeded Wilhelm Pfeffer (1845–1920) as chair of botany at the University of Basel, later relocating to the University of Tübingen, where he again was Pfeffer's successor (1887). At Tübingen he was also appointed director of the botanical institute.

Vöchting is remembered for his pioneer investigations in the field of plant physiology, including important studies involving plant root/shoot polarity.

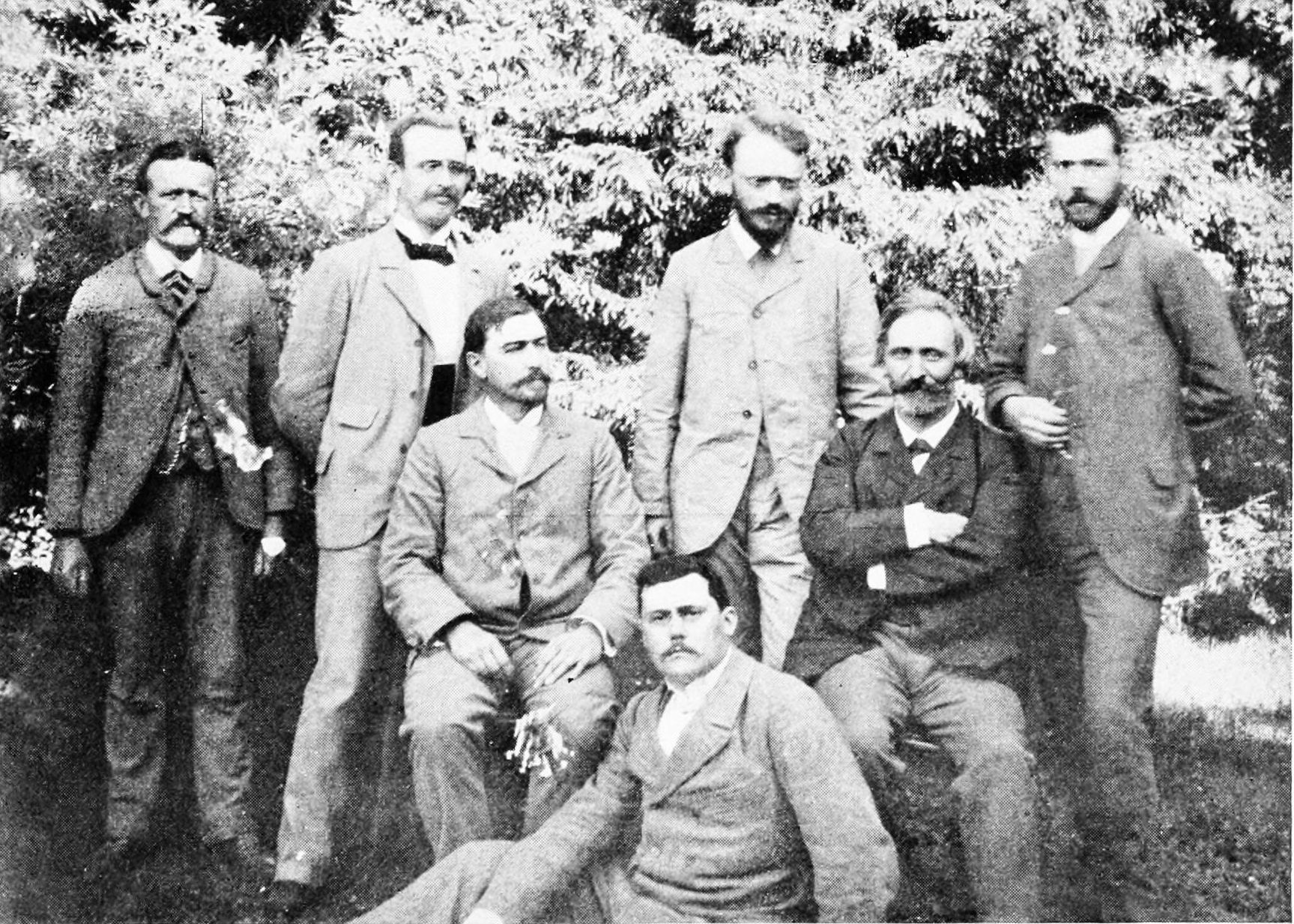
Photo of Hermann Vochting with botanical garden workers (1896)

Today the "Hermann-Vöchting-Gymnasium" in Blomberg is named in his honour.

== Written works ==
- Über organbildung im Pflanzenreich, physiologische untersuchungen, 1878 - On organ formation in the plant kingdom]] physiological studies.
- Die Bewegungen der Blüthen und Früchte, 1882 - On movement of blossoms and fruits.
- Über Transplantation am Pflanzenkörper, 1892 - On transplantation of the "plant body".
- Untersuchungen zur experimentellen Anatomie und Pathologie des Pflanzenkörpers 1908 - Experimental studies on the anatomy and pathology of the "plant body".
