= Donnersberg Railway =

Railway line in Germany

Alzey–Marnheim
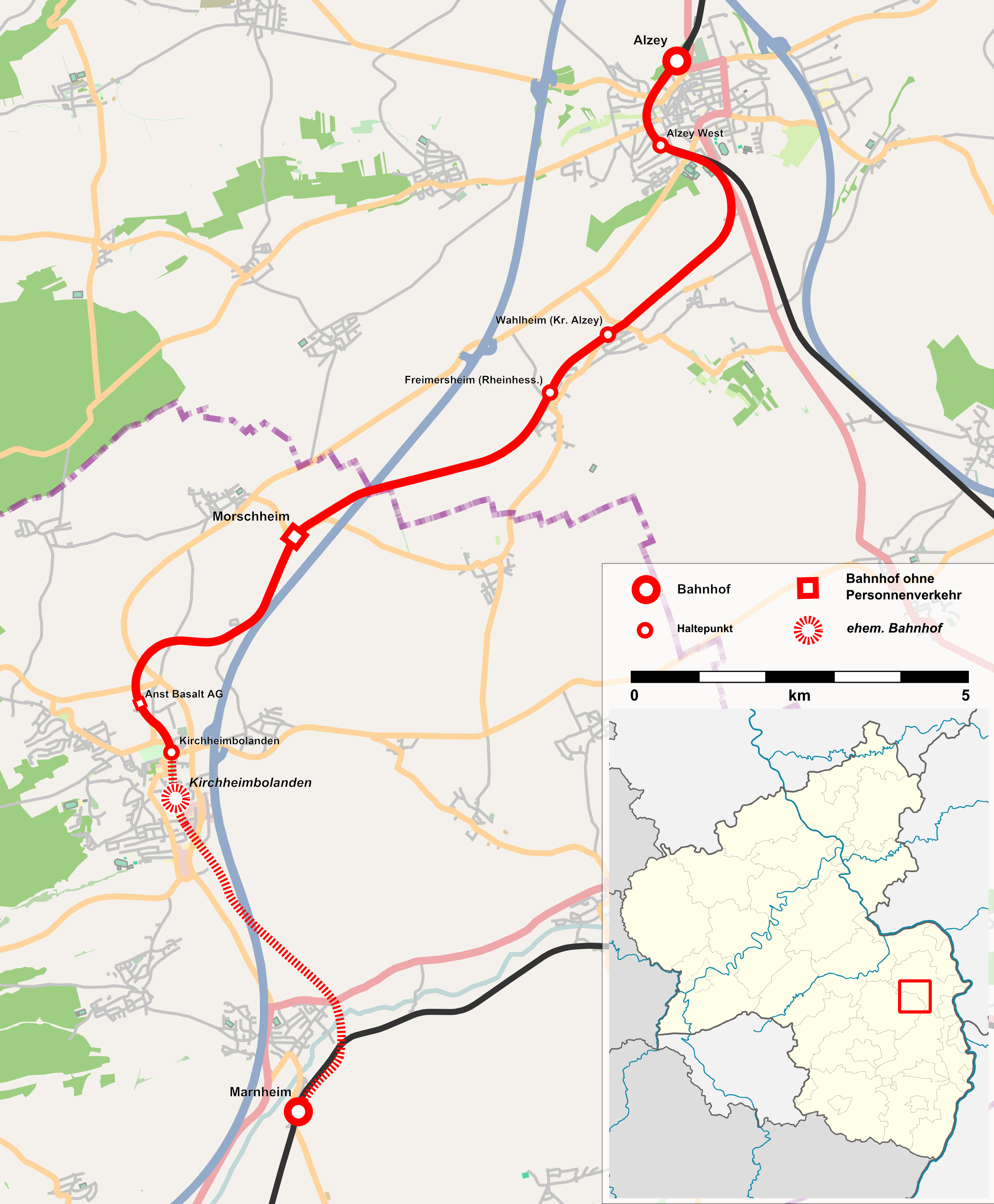

Overview
- Line number: 3322 (Marnheim state border); 3523 (state border–Alzey)

Service
- Route number: 661 (2017)

Technical
- Line length: 20.5 km (Line class: C4)
- Track gauge: 1,435 mm
- Minimum radius: 300 m
- Operating speed: 100 km/h max.
- Maximum incline: 13.5 ‰ %

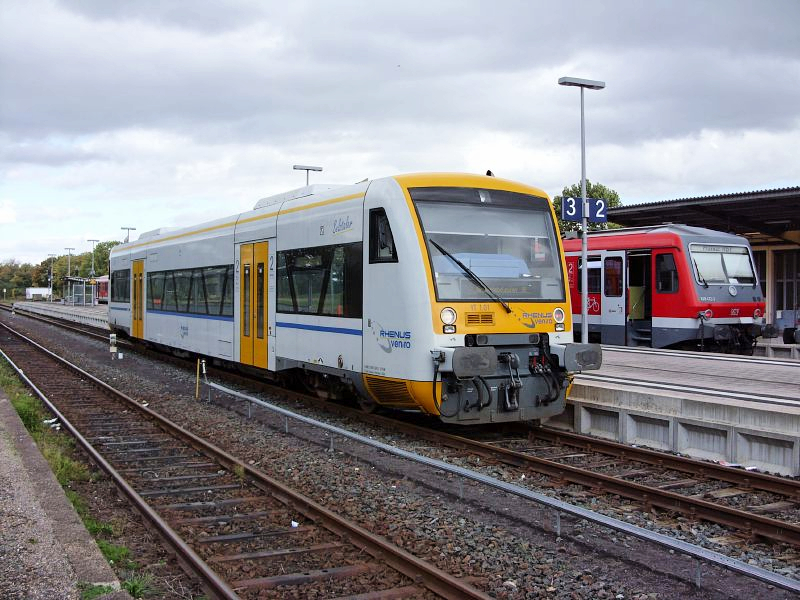
The old trains, Selztaler …

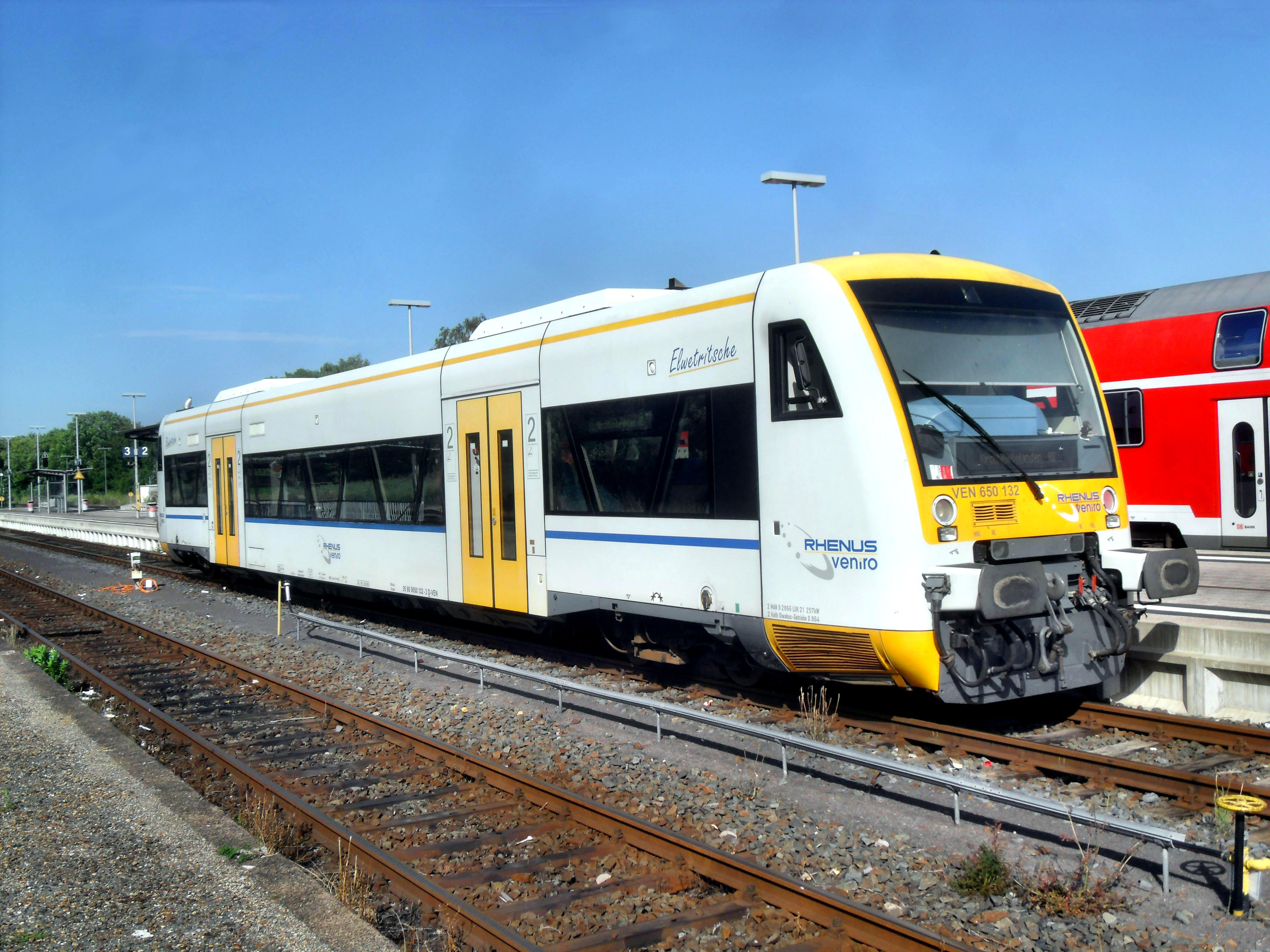
… and Elwetritsche in Alzey station (2009)

The Donnersberg Railway (German: Donnersbergbahn) is a branch line from Alzey to Kirchheimbolanden, which originally ran as far as Marnheim. Although it was once part of the main line from Kaiserslautern to Mainz, the Pfrimm Viaduct was blown up in 1945 during the Second World War between Kirchheimbolanden and Marnheim, disrupting the route. Plans to reinstate the main line with a new route came to nothing. Passenger services ceased on the remaining section of line in 1951, but were reactivated in 1999.

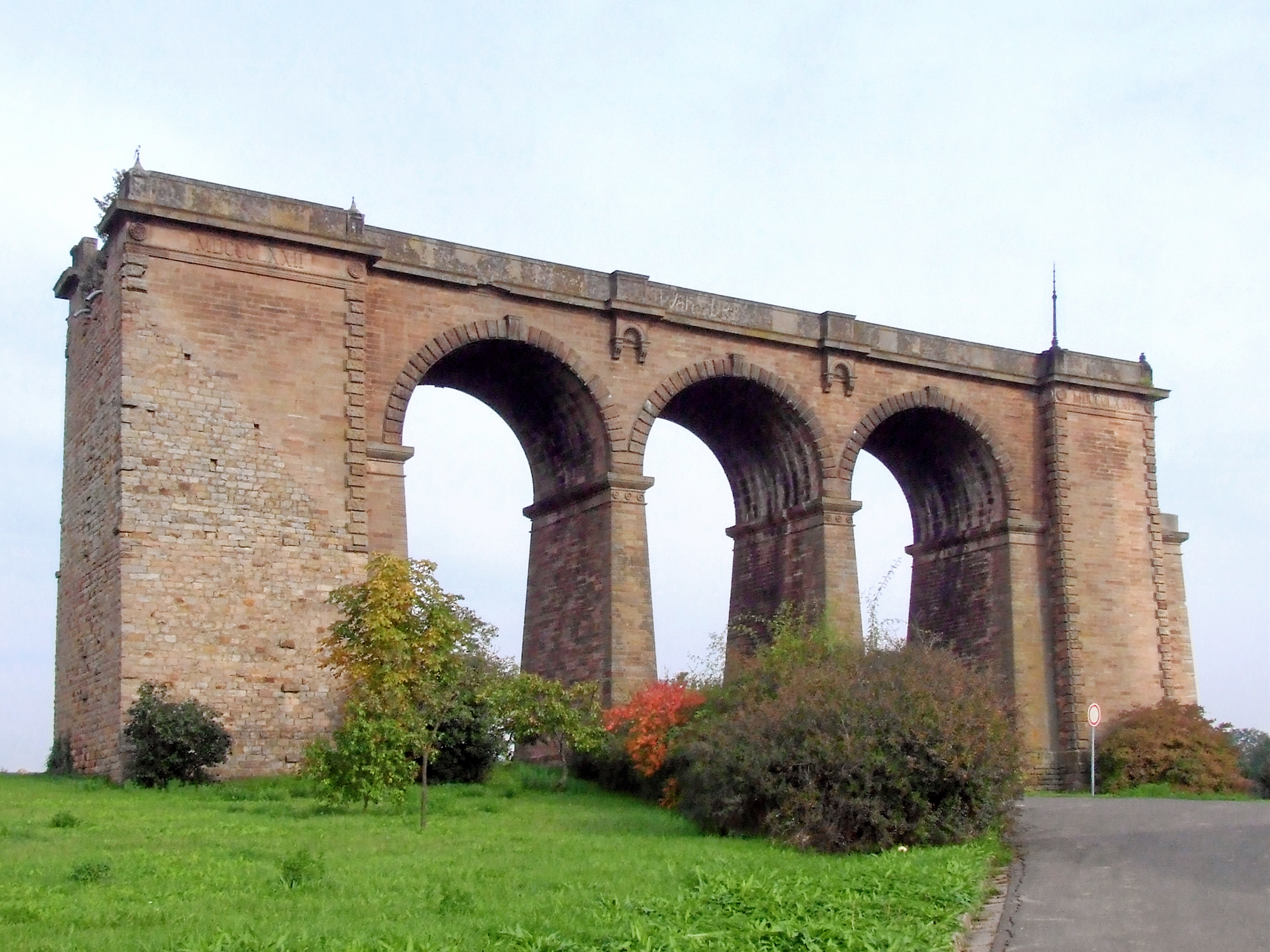
Pfrimm Viaduct

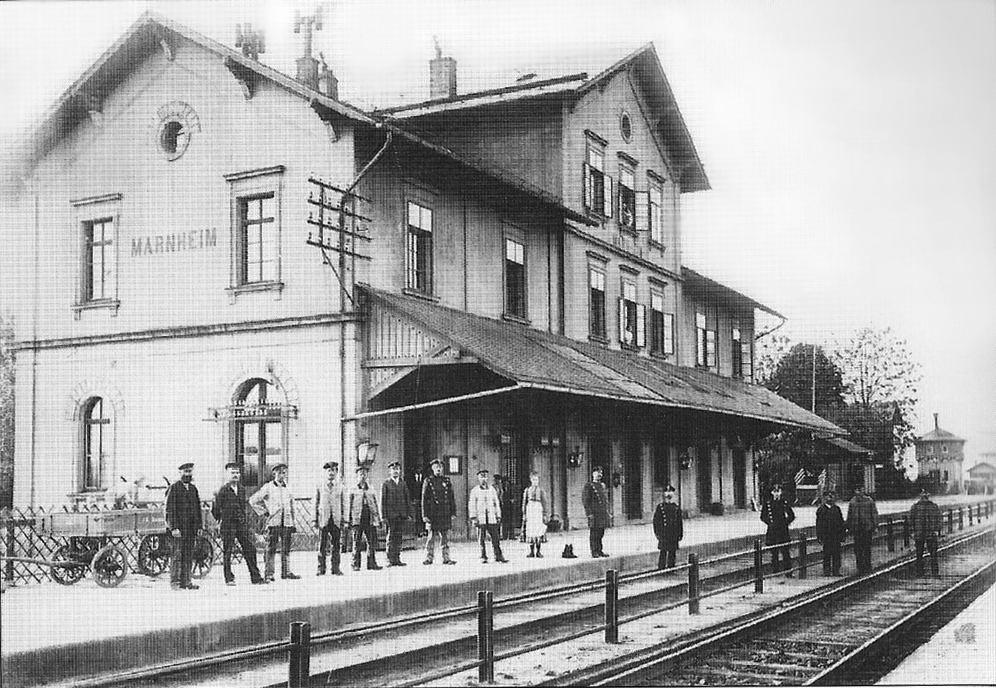
Marnheim station, early 20th century

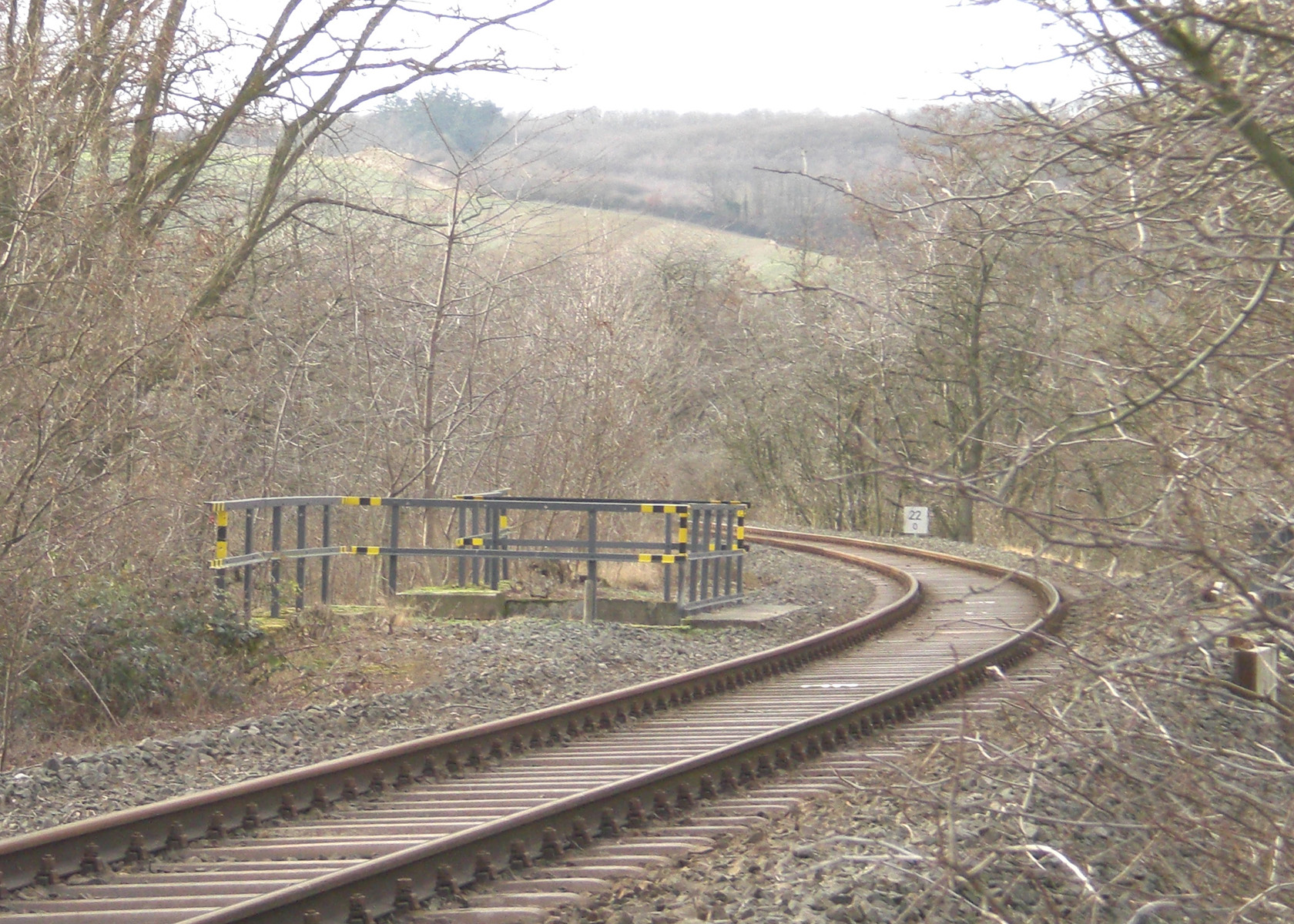
The Donnersberg Railway just before Kirchheimbolanden

== Literature ==
- Holzborn, Klaus D. (1993), Eisenbahn-Reviere Pfalz (in German), Berlin: transpress, ISBN 3-344-70790-6
