= Nierstein-Oppenheim =

Coordinates: 49°51′N 8°22′E

Nierstein-Oppenheim is a former Verbandsgemeinde ("collective municipality") in the district Mainz-Bingen (Rheinhessen) in Rhineland-Palatinate, Germany. It is situated on the left bank of the Rhine, approx. 15 km south-east of Mainz. On 1 July 2014 it merged into the new Verbandsgemeinde Rhein-Selz.

The Verbandsgemeinde consisted of the following eleven Ortsgemeinden ("local municipalities"):

1. Dalheim
2. Dexheim
3. Dienheim
4. Friesenheim
5. Hahnheim
6. Köngernheim
7. Mommenheim
8. Nierstein
9. Oppenheim
10. Selzen
11. Undenheim
