= Guntersblum (Verbandsgemeinde) =

Former collective municipality in Germany

Coordinates: 49.800°N 8.350°E

Guntersblum is a former Verbandsgemeinde ("collective municipality") in the district of Mainz-Bingen in Rhineland-Palatinate, Germany. The seat of the Verbandsgemeinde was in Guntersblum. On 1 July 2014 it merged into the new Verbandsgemeinde Rhein-Selz.

== Municipalities ==
The Verbandsgemeinde Guntersblum consisted of the following Ortsgemeinden ("local municipalities"):

1. Dolgesheim
2. Dorn-Dürkheim
3. Eimsheim
4. Guntersblum
5. Hillesheim
6. Ludwigshöhe
7. Uelversheim
8. Weinolsheim
9. Wintersheim

== Mayors ==
- 1972 - 2002: Rudi Müller (CDU)
- 2002 - 2009: Robert Kunnen (CDU)
- since 2009: Michael Stork (CDU)

== Symbols ==
Former coat of arms

Former banner
