= Dolgesheim =

- Municipality
- Coat of arms

- Location of Dolgesheim within Mainz-Bingen district
- Interactive map of Dolgesheim
- Location within Germany Location within Rhineland-Palatinate
- Coordinates: 49°47′39″N 8°15′24″E
- Country: Germany
- State: Rhineland-Palatinate
- District: Mainz-Bingen
- Municipal assoc.: Rhein-Selz

Government
  - Mayor (2019–24): Klaus Backhaus

Area
  - Total: 6.55 km^{2} (2.53 sq mi)
- Elevation: 199 m (653 ft)

Population (2025-12-31)
  - Total: 948
  - Density: 145/km^{2} (375/sq mi)
- Time zone: UTC+01:00 (CET)
  - Summer (DST): UTC+02:00 (CEST)
- Postal codes: 55278
- Dialling codes: 06733
- Vehicle registration: MZ
- Website: www.dolgesheim.de

Dolgesheim (German pronunciation: [ˈdɔlɡəshaɪm]) is an Ortsgemeinde – a municipality belonging to a Verbandsgemeinde, a kind of collective municipality – in the Mainz-Bingen district in Rhineland-Palatinate, Germany.

== Geography ==
=== Location ===
Dolgesheim lies on the Gaustraße – Landesstraße (state road) 425 – halfway between Mainz and Worms. There is a further link by Bundesstraße 9 from Oppenheim by way of Dienheim, Uelversheim and Weinolsheim, or from Guntersblum by way of Eimsheim. Dolgesheim can also be reached from the A 61, Alzey interchange, by way of Gau-Odernheim and Hillesheim.

The greatest elevation is the Kreuzberg at 211 m above sea level.

== History ==
Founded in the 5th century by Frankish tribes, the place known as Dulgisheim had its first documentary mention in 769 with a donation to the Lorsch Abbey. At this time, a Theo und Unsetz donated 2 morgens of cropland “in pago Wormat in Dulgisheimer Mark”. Early on, Dolgesheim belonged to the Counts of Leiningen, but passed in 1816 to the Grand Duchy of Hesse-Darmstadt.

Between 1825 and 1931, the construction of the Gaustraße between Mainz and Worms provided good connections to the cities of Rhenish Hesse’s. As a result, Dolgesheim was also connected early on to the water (1907) and electricity (1913).

== Politics ==
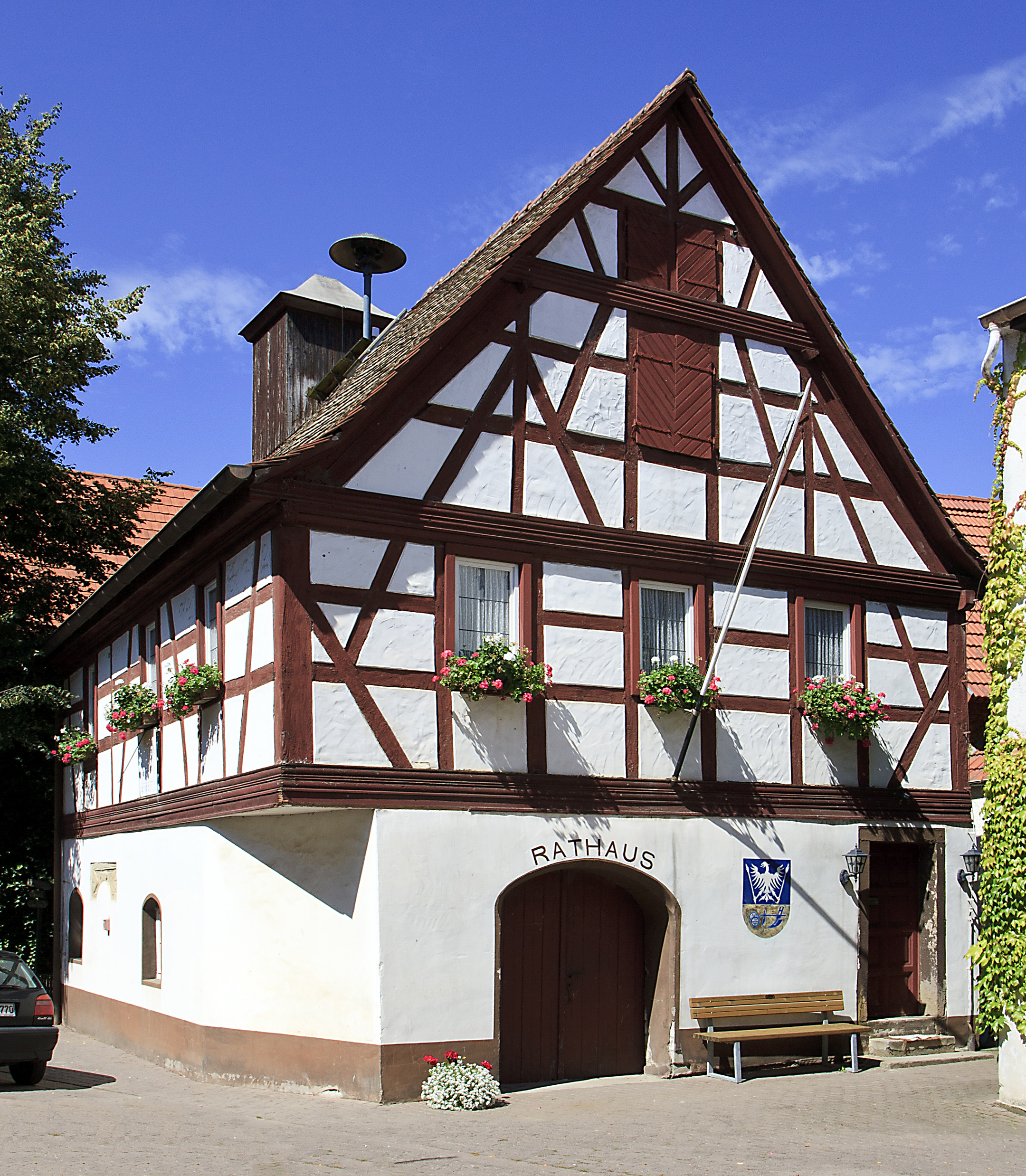
Town Hall

=== Municipal council ===
The council has since the municipal election held in 2004 been made up of 12 council members, 5 from the Bürgerliste Dolgesheim and 7 from the SPD.

=== Mayor ===
The mayor is Klaus Backhaus, elected in May 2019.

=== Coat of arms ===
The municipality's arms might be described thus: Per fess at the nombril point azure an eagle displayed argent in each talon a sceptre sable with heads of the second, one a lily sceptre and the other a staff of oath, in base Or a plough of the first.

The silver eagle is the charge borne by the Counts of Leiningen and represents their former lordship over Dolgesheim. The lily sceptre stands for purity and the Church, while the staff of oath stands for the municipality's duty and loyalty. The plough stands for the ancient working of the land and the municipality's links with agriculture.

== Culture and sightseeing ==
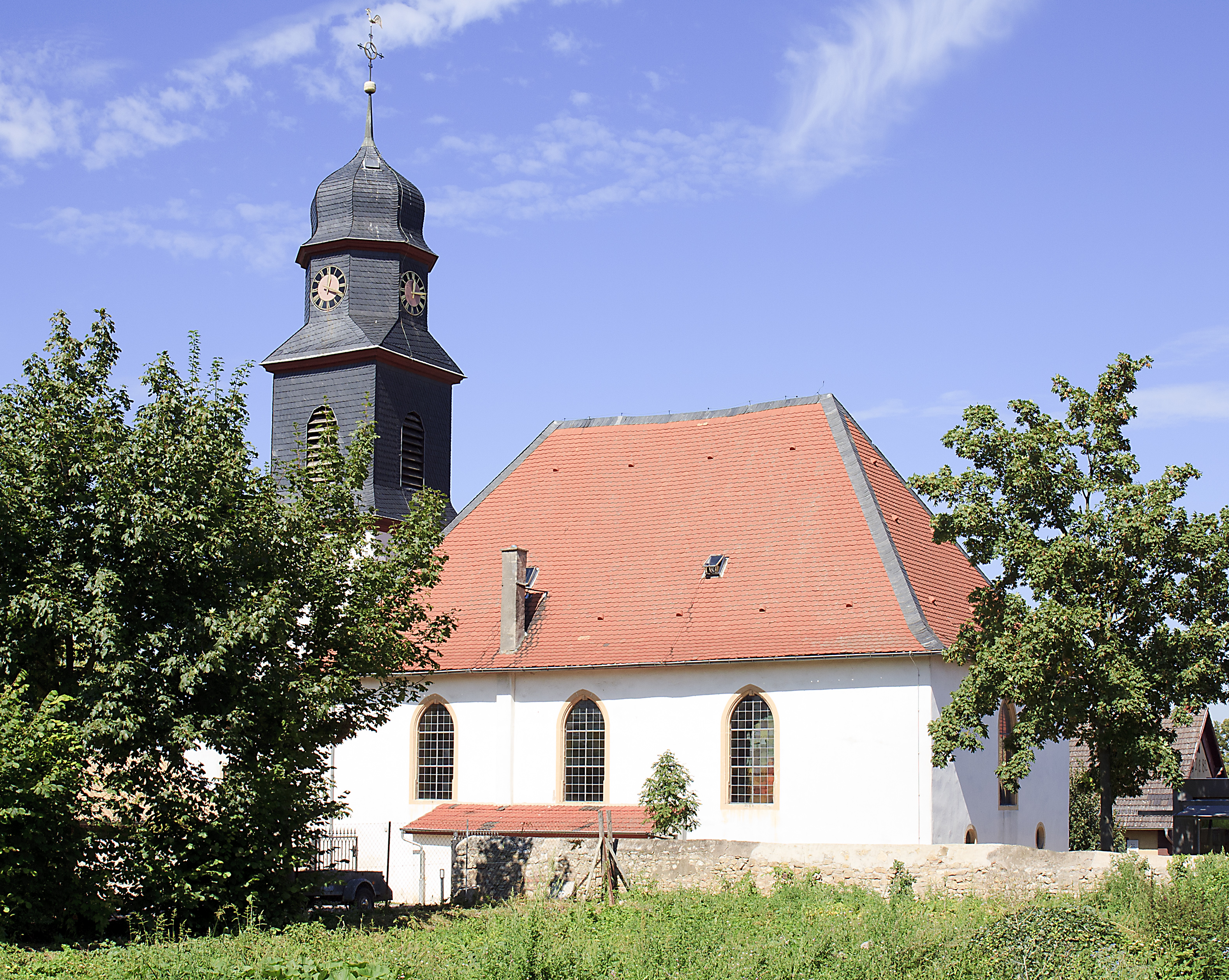
Evangelical Church

=== Buildings ===
- The church is the oldest building in the community. The foundation walls go back to the 13th century. After it was renovated it became a jewel among Evangelical churches in Rhenish Hesse.
- In the middle of the community, on the Gaustraße, stands the Town Hall, built in 1594.
- On the Kreuzberg (mountain) in more recent times, a Calvary cross has been put up.
