= Dalheim, Rhineland-Palatinate =

Dalheim
- Municipality
- Coat of arms

- Location of Dalheim within Mainz-Bingen district
- Interactive map of Dalheim
- Location within Germany Location within Rhineland-Palatinate
- Coordinates: 49°49′36″N 8°17′43″E
- Country: Germany
- State: Rhineland-Palatinate
- District: Mainz-Bingen
- Municipal assoc.: Rhein-Selz

Government
  - Mayor (2019–24): Gertrude Hennig

Area
  - Total: 6.34 km^{2} (2.45 sq mi)
- Elevation: 179 m (587 ft)

Population (2025-12-31)
  - Total: 1,016
  - Density: 160/km^{2} (415/sq mi)
- Time zone: UTC+01:00 (CET)
  - Summer (DST): UTC+02:00 (CEST)
- Postal codes: 55278
- Dialling codes: 06249
- Vehicle registration: MZ
- Website: www.dalheim-rheinhessen.de

Dalheim (German pronunciation: [ˈdaːlhaɪm]) is an Ortsgemeinde – a municipality belonging to a Verbandsgemeinde, a kind of collective municipality – in the Mainz-Bingen district in Rhineland-Palatinate, Germany.

== Geography ==
=== Location ===
The municipality lies between Mainz and Worms in Rhenish Hesse and is an agricultural community. The winemaking centre belongs to the Verbandsgemeinde Rhein-Selz, whose seat is in Oppenheim.

=== Neighbouring municipalities ===
- Köngernheim
- Dexheim
- Weinolsheim
- Uelversheim

== History ==
In 766, Dalheim had its first documentary mention.

== Religion ==
=== Jewish community ===
In the 19th century there was a small Jewish community in Dalheim. In 1861 the Jewish population peaked at 30. A synagogue was first mentioned in 1847. It was defiled by unknown perpetrators in July 1890 and is believed to have closed shortly thereafter. Most of the Jews had by then already been drawn to the cities or had emigrated. A small Jewish graveyard consecrated in the summer of 1858 and still preserved today is now the only witness to the municipality's Jewish history

== Politics ==
=== Municipal council ===
The council is made up of 17 council members, counting the part-time mayor, with seats apportioned thus:

	SPD	FWG	CDU	Total
2004	6	6	4	16 seats

(as at municipal election held on 13 June 2004)

=== Mayor ===
The mayor is Gertrude Hennig, elected in May 2019.

=== Coat of arms ===
The municipality's arms might be described thus: Azure Saint George in his glory armoured argent, at his feet and with his foot sinister on its neck a dragon couchant sinister gules, its head turned towards Saint George who is thrusting a lance bendwise Or into its mouth.

The example of the arms shown in this article does not show the tinctures. The ones mentioned above, however, are those appearing in the original German blazon.

== Regular events ==
Mid-May is the time each year for Dalheim's kermis (church consecration festival, locally known as the Kerb).
