= Mommenheim =

Mommenheim may refer to:

- Mommenheim, Bas-Rhin, France
- Mommenheim, Germany
