= Rhein-Selz =

Administrative community in Rhineland-Palatinate, Germany

- Verbandsgemeinde
- Location of Rhein-Selz within Mainz-Bingen district
- Interactive map of Rhein-Selz
- Location within Germany Location within Rhineland-Palatinate
- Coordinates: 49°51′N 8°21′E
- Country: Germany
- State: Rhineland-Palatinate
- District: Mainz-Bingen
- Seat: Bodenheim
- Subdivisions: 20 municipalities

Area
  - Total: 145.56 km^{2} (56.20 sq mi)

Population (2025-12-31)
  - Total: 40,773
  - Density: 280.11/km^{2} (725.48/sq mi)
- Time zone: UTC+01:00 (CET)
  - Summer (DST): UTC+02:00 (CEST)
- Website: www.vg-rhein-selz.de

Rhein-Selz is a Verbandsgemeinde ("collective municipality") in the district Mainz-Bingen in Rhineland-Palatinate, Germany. It takes its name from the two rivers Rhine and Selz. It is situated on the left bank of the Rhine, south of Mainz. It was formed on 1 July 2014 by the merger of the former Verbandsgemeinden Nierstein-Oppenheim and Guntersblum. Its seat is in Oppenheim.

The Verbandsgemeinde consists of the following Ortsgemeinden ("local municipalities"):

1. Dalheim
2. Dexheim
3. Dienheim
4. Dolgesheim
5. Dorn-Dürkheim
6. Eimsheim
7. Friesenheim
8. Guntersblum
9. Hahnheim
10. Hillesheim
11. Köngernheim
12. Ludwigshöhe
13. Mommenheim
14. Nierstein
15. Oppenheim
16. Selzen
17. Uelversheim
18. Undenheim
19. Weinolsheim
20. Wintersheim
