= Selzen =

- Municipality
- Coat of arms

- Location of Selzen within Mainz-Bingen district
- Interactive map of Selzen
- Location within Germany Location within Rhineland-Palatinate
- Coordinates: 49°51′38″N 08°15′19″E
- Country: Germany
- State: Rhineland-Palatinate
- District: Mainz-Bingen
- Municipal assoc.: Rhein-Selz

Government
  - Mayor (2019–24): Monja Seidel

Area
  - Total: 6.66 km^{2} (2.57 sq mi)
- Elevation: 156 m (512 ft)

Population (2025-12-31)
  - Total: 1,514
  - Density: 227/km^{2} (589/sq mi)
- Time zone: UTC+01:00 (CET)
  - Summer (DST): UTC+02:00 (CEST)
- Postal codes: 55278
- Dialling codes: 06737
- Vehicle registration: MZ
- Website: www.selzen.de

Selzen (German pronunciation: [ˈzɛltsn̩]) is an Ortsgemeinde – a municipality belonging to a Verbandsgemeinde, a kind of collective municipality – in the Mainz-Bingen district in Rhineland-Palatinate, Germany.

== Geography ==
=== Location ===
Selzen lies between Mainz and Worms in Rhenish Hesse on the Selz. The winegrowing centre belongs to the Verbandsgemeinde Rhein-Selz, whose seat is in Oppenheim.

== History ==
In 782, Selzen had its first documentary mention under the name Salzen in the Lorsch codex. Grave finds from the New Stone Age (2000 BC), from Roman times (AD 100) and from Frankish times in the 6th and 7th century document a historic place.

From the Early Middle Ages until the 16th century, Selzen belonged to the Worms Cathedral Foundation. The Cathedral Court was the Foundation’s tithe court. In the 15th century, the Electorate of the Palatinate acquired the chapel court and ousted the Worms Cathedral Foundation.

This action is reflected in the then court seal (and in the current coat of arms), with the blazon reading in part “the Palatine lion holds in the right paw the robbed Worms key”. In 1792, the Worms Cathedral Foundation’s ecclesiastical landlordship ended, and along with that, so did the tithes payable to Worms. Such joy was brought by this that the elm at Selzen’s southeast corner was felled and the community had a bonfire.

In 1797, Selzen passed with the entire département Mont-Tonnerre to the French First Republic. In 1816, however, French rule ended and it thereafter belonged to the newly formed province of Rhenish Hesse (Rheinhessen), which in turn belonged to the Grand Duchy of Hesse. Since 1945, Selzen has belongs to the state of Rhineland-Palatinate (Rheinland-Pfalz). With the administrative reform that came into force in 1972, the municipality became part of the Verbandsgemeinde of Nierstein-Oppenheim.

The Lords of Bolanden owned a castle here in the 12th century. Beginning in 1294, the Worms Cathedral Foundation held the Vogtei. After 1453 when the Foundation had to yield a half of this to the Palatinate, the stronger of the two partners bit by bit usurped the whole lordship over the village. According to a legend, in the Middle Ages, the villagers were obliged to keep the frogs in the Selz or in the pond quiet by striking the water with staves. The lordly household wanted to sleep undisturbed by any croaking. From this comes the villagers’ nickname Selzer Frösche – Selzen Frogs.

Selzen, as witnessed by the Frankish grave finds, grew together from three cores of settlement, the church in the east, the Worms tithe court in the northwest and the mill in the south, near which a stone path (1617) takes the footpath to Undenheim over the Selz. As early as 1413, the Palatinate owned three estates, among which was the still existent Kapellenhof (“Chapel Estate”), where very often exhibitions are held or plays staged during the summer months. In 1572, the Romanesque church was torn down, all but the tower, which still stands today. The new Gothic building was then, in 1740 and 1741, replaced with a Baroque church which houses a Stumm organ from 1787. East of the main thoroughfare, in the sidestreets, are found several timber-frame buildings. At the end of Ostergasse are remnants of pillars from the old fortifications, the Oppenheimer Pforte (gate).

== Politics ==
=== Municipal council ===
The council is made up of 17 council members, counting the part-time mayor, with seats apportioned thus:

	SPD	Liste Selzen	FWG	WG Heimlich	Total
2004	6	6	2	2	16 seats

(as at municipal election held on 13 June 2004)

=== Mayor ===
The mayor is Monja Seidel.

=== Coat of arms ===
The municipality’s arms might be described thus: Sable, issuant from base sinister a demi-lion Or armed, langued and crowned gules, holding in his gambe dexter a key argent reversed palewise.

The village’s oldest known seal dates from 1537 and shows this same composition.

== Culture and sightseeing ==
=== Regular events ===
- On Ascension Day or Father's Day, the Cycle Path Festival (Radwegefest) is held.
- The Wine Festival is held in Selzen in mid June.
- On the second weekend in September, the kermis (church consecration festival, locally known as the Kerb) is held.
- Every year on the 4th day in Advent, the men’s singing club and the band perform under the Christmas tree in the community core.
- Every December, the church parishes together with the neighbouring municipality of Hahnheim stage the activity Unser Dorf, ein Adventskalender (“Our Village, an Advent Calendar”). Within its framework, a symbolic window opening takes place each evening along with the reading of a Christmas story, a singalong and a drink.

== Economy and infrastructure ==
=== Transport ===
- The municipality is crossed by the L 425 state road. Bundesstraße 420 lies 2 km to the south. The Autobahn A 63 can be reached by car in roughly 10 minutes.
- There are bus links to Nieder Olm, Mainz, Alzey and Oppenheim.
