= Weinolsheim =

- Municipality
- Coat of arms

- Location of Weinolsheim within Mainz-Bingen district
- Interactive map of Weinolsheim
- Location within Germany Location within Rhineland-Palatinate
- Coordinates: 49°48′56″N 8°16′22″E
- Country: Germany
- State: Rhineland-Palatinate
- District: Mainz-Bingen
- Municipal assoc.: Rhein-Selz

Government
  - Mayor (2019–24): Gabriele Wagner (CDU)

Area
  - Total: 5.93 km^{2} (2.29 sq mi)
- Elevation: 183 m (600 ft)

Population (2025-12-31)
  - Total: 712
  - Density: 120/km^{2} (311/sq mi)
- Time zone: UTC+01:00 (CET)
  - Summer (DST): UTC+02:00 (CEST)
- Postal codes: 55278
- Dialling codes: 06249
- Vehicle registration: MZ
- Website: www.weinolsheim.de

Weinolsheim (German pronunciation: [ˈvaɪnɔlshaɪm]) is an Ortsgemeinde – a municipality belonging to a Verbandsgemeinde, a kind of collective municipality – in the Mainz-Bingen district in Rhineland-Palatinate, Germany.

== Geography ==
=== Location ===
The municipality lies in Rhenish Hesse. It belongs to the Verbandsgemeinde Rhein-Selz.

=== Neighbouring municipalities ===
These are Bechtolsheim (indirectly, as there is no road link), Dalheim, Dolgesheim, Friesenheim and Uelversheim.

== History ==
Within what is now Weinolsheim’s municipal area about the year 500 lived Franks. It is believed that there was a Frankish village that was kingly domain, and therefore a royal estate. It is also thought that the placename comes from a Frankish elder kinsman named Winolf, who might have founded the village. On 22 October 789, Weinolsheim had its first documentary mention in a donation document from the Lorsch Abbey.

== Politics ==
=== Coat of arms ===
The municipality’s arms might be described thus: Per fess abased, argent Saint Peter of the field clad in azure with nimbus, in his hand dexter a staff bendwise, in his hand sinister a key reversed palewise Or, and Or an eagle displayed sable armed, langued and beaked gules.

=== Town partnerships ===
- Brochon, Côte-d'Or, France

== Culture and sightseeing ==
On Gaustraße is found a warriors’ memorial made of Flonheim sandstone that recalls those from Weinolsheim who fell in the Franco-Prussian War (1870–1871). The obelisk was carved between 1875 and 1880 and is adorned with the Grand Ducal Hessian lion. On the facets are found the names of the fallen and a reference to the Battle of Gravelotte.

== Economy and infrastructure ==
Weinolsheim is strongly based on Rhenish-Hessian winegrowing. In a municipality with a relatively small land area are nevertheless found thirteen professional winery businesses, among them the 20 ha winery Manz, recommended by the German Agricultural Society (Deutsche Landwirtschafts-Gesellschaft or DLG). The local winegrowers work vineyards along the Rhine waterfront, but also to a great extent on the plateau of the Rhine terrace. The local winegrowing locations Güldenmorgen and Krötenbrunnen are in the Nierstein winegrowing area (Bereich). Erich and Eric Manz have a second business bottling wine outside the municipal core.

=== Public institutions ===
The volunteer Weinolsheim fire brigade joined with the neighbouring fire brigade from Uelversheim in 2007, forming the Uelversheim-Weinolsheim firefighting unit. In the course of this voluntary restructuring, a new, modern fire station with a drill yard was built between the two municipalities.
