= Hillesheim, Mainz-Bingen =

Hillesheim
- Municipality
- Coat of arms

- Location of Hillesheim within Mainz-Bingen district
- Interactive map of Hillesheim
- Location within Germany Location within Rhineland-Palatinate
- Coordinates: 49°46′35″N 8°15′22″E
- Country: Germany
- State: Rhineland-Palatinate
- District: Mainz-Bingen
- Municipal assoc.: Rhein-Selz

Government
  - Mayor (2019–24): Melanie Schindel

Area
  - Total: 5.54 km^{2} (2.14 sq mi)
- Elevation: 181 m (594 ft)

Population (2025-12-31)
  - Total: 685
  - Density: 124/km^{2} (320/sq mi)
- Time zone: UTC+01:00 (CET)
  - Summer (DST): UTC+02:00 (CEST)
- Postal codes: 67586
- Dialling codes: 06733
- Vehicle registration: MZ
- Website: www.hillesheim-rhh.de

Hillesheim (German pronunciation: [ˈhɪləshaɪm]) is an Ortsgemeinde – a municipality belonging to a Verbandsgemeinde, a kind of collective municipality – in the Mainz-Bingen district in Rhineland-Palatinate, Germany.

== Geography ==
The municipality belongs to the Verbandsgemeinde Rhein-Selz.

=== Neighbouring municipalities ===
Hillesheim’s neighbours are Dittelsheim-Heßloch, Dolgesheim, Dorn-Dürkheim, Frettenheim, Gau-Odernheim and Eimsheim.

=== Constituent communities ===
Hillesheim has two centres, Ortskern, or municipal core, and Bahnhof, or railway station. In the outlying centre of Bahnhof stands the former railway station once served by the Osthofen–Gau Odernheim line and used together with the neighbouring municipality of Dorn-Dürkheim.

== History ==
In the 13th century, Hillesheim had its first documentary mention, although the laying of the churchtower’s foundation stone has been dated to 1204. In 1387, ownership of Hillesheim was divided up: The Kirchbergteil (Teil means “part” in German) went to Rosenthal Convent at the Donnersberg (“Thunder Mountain”) whereas the Haßlocher Teil remained in Imperial hands. Despite changing ruling relationships in the centuries that followed, the two parts remained apart.

In 1792, Hillesheim was occupied by the French Revolutionary Army, and passed to the French department of Donnersberg. In 1814, Russian forces crossed the Rhine to vanquish Emperor Napoleon. The soldiers, however, died to a man of a sickness and were buried on the Kirchberg (mountain). In 1816, Hillesheim passed to the Grand Duchy of Hesse and was assigned in the time that followed first to the Alzey district and then in 1852 to the newly founded Oppenheim district.

After the Second World War, Hillesheim, along with all Rhenish Hesse, belonged to the French zone of occupation, out of which the state of Rhineland-Palatinate arose in 1949. Since district reform in 1969, Hillesheim has belonged to the Mainz-Bingen district.

=== Name ===
Besides the predominant explanation of the name being derived from Higeliheim or Hügelsheim because of the hilly landscape (Hügel means “hill” in German), there is a competing explanation holding that the name comes from Hültzheim or Holtzheim, which would be a reference to the wealth of wood (Holz in German).

== Politics ==
=== Municipal council ===
The council is made up of 13 council members, counting the part-time mayor, with seats apportioned thus:

	CDU	SPD	FWG	Total
2004	4	6	2	12 seats

(as at municipal election held on 13 June 2004)

=== Mayor ===
The Ortsbürgermeister is Melanie Schindel, elected by the municipal council in August 2019.

=== Coat of arms ===
The municipality’s arms might be described thus: Per pale Or fretty gules and azure a rose slipped argent seeded of the second.

In Ludwig Roselius’s Coffee Hag albums from the early 20th century, Hillesheim’s arms are shown in somewhat different tinctures. On the sinister (armsbearer’s left, viewer’s right) side, the field is gules (red) instead of azure (blue), and the rose is seeded Or (has a golden centre) instead of gules.
