= Dorn-Dürkheim =

- Municipality
- Coat of arms

- Location of Dorn-Dürkheim within Mainz-Bingen district
- Interactive map of Dorn-Dürkheim
- Location within Germany Location within Rhineland-Palatinate
- Coordinates: 49°46′06″N 8°16′10″E
- Country: Germany
- State: Rhineland-Palatinate
- District: Mainz-Bingen
- Municipal assoc.: Rhein-Selz

Government
  - Mayor (2019–24): Claus-Dieter Biegler

Area
  - Total: 5.6 km^{2} (2.2 sq mi)
- Elevation: 172 m (564 ft)

Population (2025-12-31)
  - Total: 914
  - Density: 160/km^{2} (420/sq mi)
- Time zone: UTC+01:00 (CET)
  - Summer (DST): UTC+02:00 (CEST)
- Postal codes: 67585
- Dialling codes: 06733
- Vehicle registration: MZ
- Website: www.vg-rhein-selz.de

Dorn-Dürkheim (German pronunciation: [ˈdɔʁn ˈdʏʁkhaɪm]) is an Ortsgemeinde – a municipality belonging to a Verbandsgemeinde, a kind of collective municipality – in the Mainz-Bingen district in Rhineland-Palatinate, Germany.

== Geography ==
=== Location ===
Dorn-Dürkheim lies between Mainz and Worms, in the “Heart of Rhenish Hesse”. The municipality belongs to the Verbandsgemeinde Rhein-Selz.

== History ==
In 767, Dorn-Dürkheim had its first documentary mention in a document from the Lorsch Abbey. The municipality belonged from the 10th to 12th century to the Bishopric of Worms and passed thereafter as a fief to the Lords of Bolanden. Assigned to the Oberamt of Alzey beginning in 1457, Dorn-Dürkheim was temporarily occupied by the French, before the community, along with the whole province of Rhenish Hesse passed to the Grand Duchy of Hesse. In 1897, Dorn-Dürkheim acquired a railway link on the Osthofen–Gau-Odernheim line.

Since the Second World War, Dorn-Dürkheim has belonged to the newly founded federal state of Rhineland-Palatinate, at first in the Alzey-Worms district. The municipality was incorporated into the Verbandsgemeinde of Guntersblum in 1972 and was also assigned to the Mainz-Bingen district.

== Politics ==
=== Municipal council ===
The council is made up of 13 council members, counting the part-time mayor, with seats apportioned thus:

	CDU	Wählergruppe Schmitt	Total
2004	7	5	12 seats

(as at municipal election held on 13 June 2004)

=== Coat of arms ===
The municipality's arms might be described thus: Per fess sable a demi-lion rampant Or armed, langued and crowned gules, and azure a crozier from base issuant, the crook ending in a rose argent.

== Economy and infrastructure ==
=== Transport ===
The nearest Autobahn interchange is Biebelnheim on the A 63, some 10 km away.

- In the neighbouring centre of Hillesheim a railway connection on the Osthofen–Gau Odernheim line was once available. Service ended on 29 September 1974.

== Palaeontology ==
In 1972, one of Europe's richest mammalian fossil fields was discovered through pedological investigation at Dorn-Dürkheim, with many species from the Miocene. In an oxbow of the ancient Rhine bone and tooth fragments were recovered from more than 70 mammalian species, among others sabre-toothed cats, hyenas, tapirs, muntjacs, dwarf deer, forest antelopes, forerunners of today's horses, and proboscideans from the time about 8.5 million years ago. Palaeoecological analysis suggests that the site of Dorn-Dürkheim 1 was a temperate forest.
