= Mommenheim, Germany =

- Municipality
- Coat of arms

- Location of Mommenheim, Germany within Mainz-Bingen district
- Interactive map of Mommenheim, Germany
- Location within Germany Location within Rhineland-Palatinate
- Coordinates: 49°53′00″N 8°16′10″E
- Country: Germany
- State: Rhineland-Palatinate
- District: Mainz-Bingen
- Municipal assoc.: Rhein-Selz

Government
  - Mayor (2019–24): Hans-Peter Broock (CDU)

Area
  - Total: 7.8 km^{2} (3.0 sq mi)
- Elevation: 134 m (440 ft)

Population (2025-12-31)
  - Total: 3,162
  - Density: 410/km^{2} (1,000/sq mi)
- Time zone: UTC+01:00 (CET)
  - Summer (DST): UTC+02:00 (CEST)
- Postal codes: 55278
- Dialling codes: 06138
- Vehicle registration: MZ
- Website: www.mommenheim-online.de

Mommenheim (German pronunciation: [ˈmɔmənhaɪm]) is an Ortsgemeinde – a municipality belonging to a Verbandsgemeinde, a kind of collective municipality – in the Mainz-Bingen district in Rhineland-Palatinate, Germany.

== Geography ==
=== Location ===
Mommenheim lies between Mainz and Worms in Rhenish Hesse. The winegrowing centre belongs to the Verbandsgemeinde Rhein-Selz, whose seat is in Oppenheim.

== History ==
In 764, Mommenheim had its first documentary mention.

== Politics ==
=== Town council ===
The council is made up of 21 council members, counting the honorary mayor, with seats apportioned thus:

| | SPD | CDU | FWG | Total |
| 2019 | 8 | 12 | - | 20 seats |
| 2004 | 5 | 8 | 7 | 20 seats |

(as at municipal election held on 26. May 2019)

=== Coat of arms ===
The municipality’s arms might be described thus: Per pale gules a cramp surmounted by an orb voided inside which another orb argent and azure a wheel spoked of six argent.

These arms were adopted on 28 June 1972. The old arms showed a silver field with the cramp (or Wolfsangel as it is called in German) with an empty ring in the middle. It may refer to the hunting rights granted Mommenheim in 1276 by Philipp von Hohenfels (in Germany the Wolfsangel is commonly held to be a kind of wolf trap). The wheel comes from the former lords’ arms – the House of Hohenfels, and then later the House of Bolanden as well – and is, in fact, the Wheel of Mainz.

== Culture and sightseeing ==
=== Regular events ===
On the third weekend in September Mommenheim always has a kermis (church consecration festival, locally known as the Kerb). It is organized by the municipal administration and the kermis club. Two weeks before this, on the fairgrounds there is always the MKV’s (Carnival club) Sommersonnenwendfeuer (“Summer Solstice Fire”). At year’s end, the MKV also stages a New Year’s Eve ball.

Furthermore, the fire brigade’s “Dance into May” is a popular event.

Another famous regular event is the Open Air Music Festival in August organised by the Lautslochtrappers Mommenheim. The festival is free of charge and held on a grass field near the Domtal Golfcours Mommenheim.

== Economy and infrastructure ==
=== Transport ===
The municipality is crossed by Landesstraße (state road) L 425. Bundesstraße 420 lies 6 km away to the south. The Autobahn A 63 can be reached by car in roughly 10 minutes.

Mommenheim lies within the area of the Rhein-Nahe-Nahverkehrsverbund (“Rhine-Nahe Local Transport Association”). The nearest railway stations are each some 7 km away from Mommenheim: Nackenheim and Nierstein on the Mainz–Mannheim railway line, and Nieder-Olm on the Mainz–Alzey line. The Regio route 660 of the Omnibusverkehr Rhein-Nahe runs three times an hour on weekdays and on weekends once an hour to Mainz Hauptbahnhof, and also once an hour on weekdays and every two hours on weekends to Alzey railway station, thereby offering a replacement for the abandoned Bodenheim–Alzey railway line and its station Mommenheim (Rheinh).
