= Köngernheim =

- Municipality
- Coat of arms

- Location of Köngernheim within Mainz-Bingen district
- Interactive map of Köngernheim
- Location within Germany Location within Rhineland-Palatinate
- Coordinates: 49°50′44″N 8°14′48″E
- Country: Germany
- State: Rhineland-Palatinate
- District: Mainz-Bingen
- Municipal assoc.: Rhein-Selz

Government
  - Mayor (2019–24): Jutta Hoff

Area
  - Total: 3.63 km^{2} (1.40 sq mi)
- Elevation: 138 m (453 ft)

Population (2025-12-31)
  - Total: 1,260
  - Density: 347/km^{2} (899/sq mi)
- Time zone: UTC+01:00 (CET)
  - Summer (DST): UTC+02:00 (CEST)
- Postal codes: 55278
- Dialling codes: 06737
- Vehicle registration: MZ
- Website: www.koengernheim.de

Köngernheim (German pronunciation: [ˈkœŋɐnhaɪm]) is an Ortsgemeinde – a municipality belonging to a Verbandsgemeinde, a kind of collective municipality – in the Mainz-Bingen district in Rhineland-Palatinate, Germany.

== Geography ==
=== Location ===
The municipality lies between Mainz and Worms and is a place characterized by agriculture. The winegrowing centre belongs to the Verbandsgemeinde Rhein-Selz, whose seat is in Oppenheim. To Mainz it is roughly 20 km, to Wiesbaden 41 km and to Frankfurt 57 km.

=== Neighbouring municipalities ===
Köngernheim's neighbours are Friesenheim, Hahnheim, Selzen and Undenheim.

== History ==
On 27 February 782, Köngernheim had its first documentary mention in the Lorsch codex as Cuningesheim (meaning “king’s home, or “king’s people’s settlement”). At the second documentary mention in 804, the name was rendered Cuningeroheim.

A church was first mentioned in 1299. The portal's sandstone walls and a Gothic window go back to the 14th century.

The Catholic church was built in 1931 and 1932. Until that time, the Evangelical church was shared by both denominations.

== Politics ==
=== Municipal council ===
The council is made up of 16 council members. The factions represented on council are the kreative liste Köngernheim with 8 seats and the FWG and the SPD with 4 seats each.

=== Mayor ===
- Mrs. Jutta Hoff has been in office as the Ortsbürgermeisterin since 14 July 2004.

=== Coat of arms ===
The municipality's arms might be described thus: Per fess sable three roundels argent two and one, the last couped at the partition, argent the letter K gules.

This was a new coat of arms adopted in 1958. The old coat of arms showed the composition Sable five roundels argent (presumably two, one and two, that is, in a quincunx arrangement). This was the arms formerly borne by the Counts of Sickingen. A court seal showing this arrangement is known from 1610, as is a seal impression from 1725.

== Culture and sightseeing ==
=== Buildings ===
The Untermühle (“Lower Mill”), by oral tradition with a millstone from 1608, was built in the 16th century

== Famous people ==
=== Sons and daughters of the town ===
- Kathrin Hammen - Rhenish Hessian Wine Queen 2004–2005
