= Friesenheim, Rhineland-Palatinate =

Friesenheim
- Municipality
- Coat of arms

- Location of Friesenheim within Mainz-Bingen district
- Interactive map of Friesenheim
- Location within Germany Location within Rhineland-Palatinate
- Coordinates: 49°50′11″N 8°15′24″E
- Country: Germany
- State: Rhineland-Palatinate
- District: Mainz-Bingen
- Municipal assoc.: Rhein-Selz

Government
  - Mayor (2019–24): Daniel Kölsch

Area
  - Total: 3.47 km^{2} (1.34 sq mi)
- Elevation: 167 m (548 ft)

Population (2025-12-31)
  - Total: 727
  - Density: 210/km^{2} (543/sq mi)
- Time zone: UTC+01:00 (CET)
  - Summer (DST): UTC+02:00 (CEST)
- Postal codes: 55278
- Dialling codes: 06737
- Vehicle registration: MZ
- Website: www.friesenheim-rheinhessen.de

Friesenheim (German pronunciation: [ˈfʁiːzn̩haɪm]) is an Ortsgemeinde – a municipality belonging to a Verbandsgemeinde, a kind of collective municipality – in the Mainz-Bingen district in Rhineland-Palatinate, Germany.

== Geography ==
=== Location ===
The municipality lies between Mainz and Worms and is an agriculturally oriented community. The winegrowing centre belongs to the Verbandsgemeinde Rhein-Selz, whose seat is in Oppenheim.

=== Neighbouring municipalities ===
These are Köngernheim, Undenheim and Weinolsheim.

== History ==
In 803, Friesenheim had its first documentary mention in the Codex Fuldensis when the Frank Theotbald donated estates in Dubilesheim and Friesenheim to the Lorsch Abbey. Some researchers, though, link this entry in the Codex with Friesenheim in Alsace. The name's meaning is “Friso’s Home”. Based on the name German word Friesen (“Frisians”), the reasonable assumption is the community was founded by Frisians.

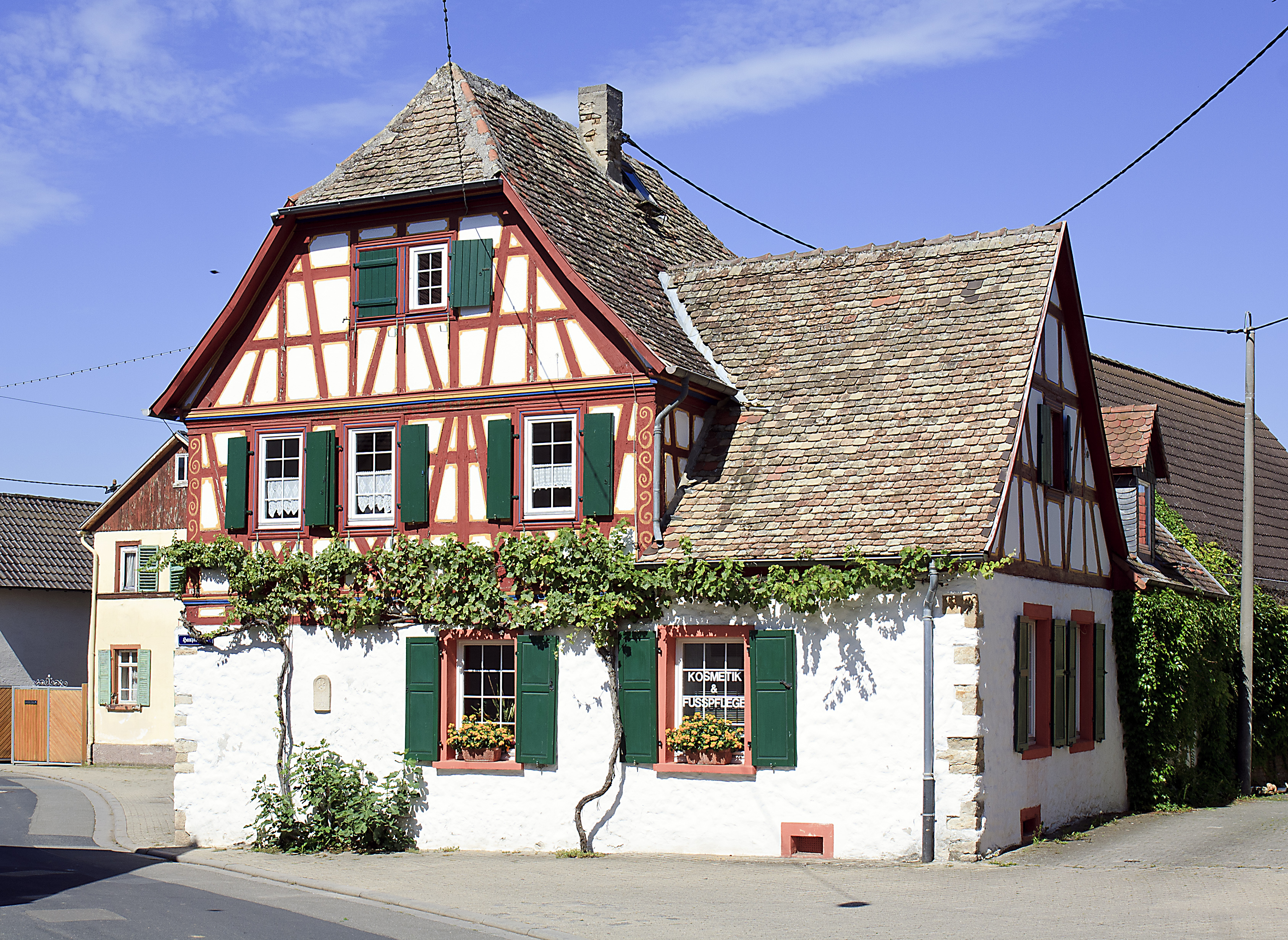
Friesenheim Old town hall

== Politics ==
=== Municipal council ===
The council is made up of 13 council members, counting the part-time mayor, with seats apportioned thus:

	SPD	FWG	Total
2004	2	10	12 seats

(as at municipal election held on 13 June 2004)

=== Ortsbürgermeister ===
The Ortsbürgermeister – mayor of the Ortsgemeinde – is Daniel Kölsch, elected in May 2019.

=== Coat of arms ===
The municipality's arms might be described thus: Gules a lion rampant argent armed sable and crowned Or, and a chief of the second.
