= Undenheim =

- Municipality
- Coat of arms

- Location of Undenheim within Mainz-Bingen district
- Interactive map of Undenheim
- Location within Germany Location within Rhineland-Palatinate
- Coordinates: 49°50′17″N 8°13′08″E
- Country: Germany
- State: Rhineland-Palatinate
- District: Mainz-Bingen
- Municipal assoc.: Rhein-Selz

Government
  - Mayor (2019–24): Marcus Becker

Area
  - Total: 9.97 km^{2} (3.85 sq mi)
- Elevation: 140 m (460 ft)

Population (2025-12-31)
  - Total: 2,920
  - Density: 293/km^{2} (759/sq mi)
- Time zone: UTC+01:00 (CET)
  - Summer (DST): UTC+02:00 (CEST)
- Postal codes: 55278
- Dialling codes: 06737
- Vehicle registration: MZ, BIN
- Website: www.undenheim.de

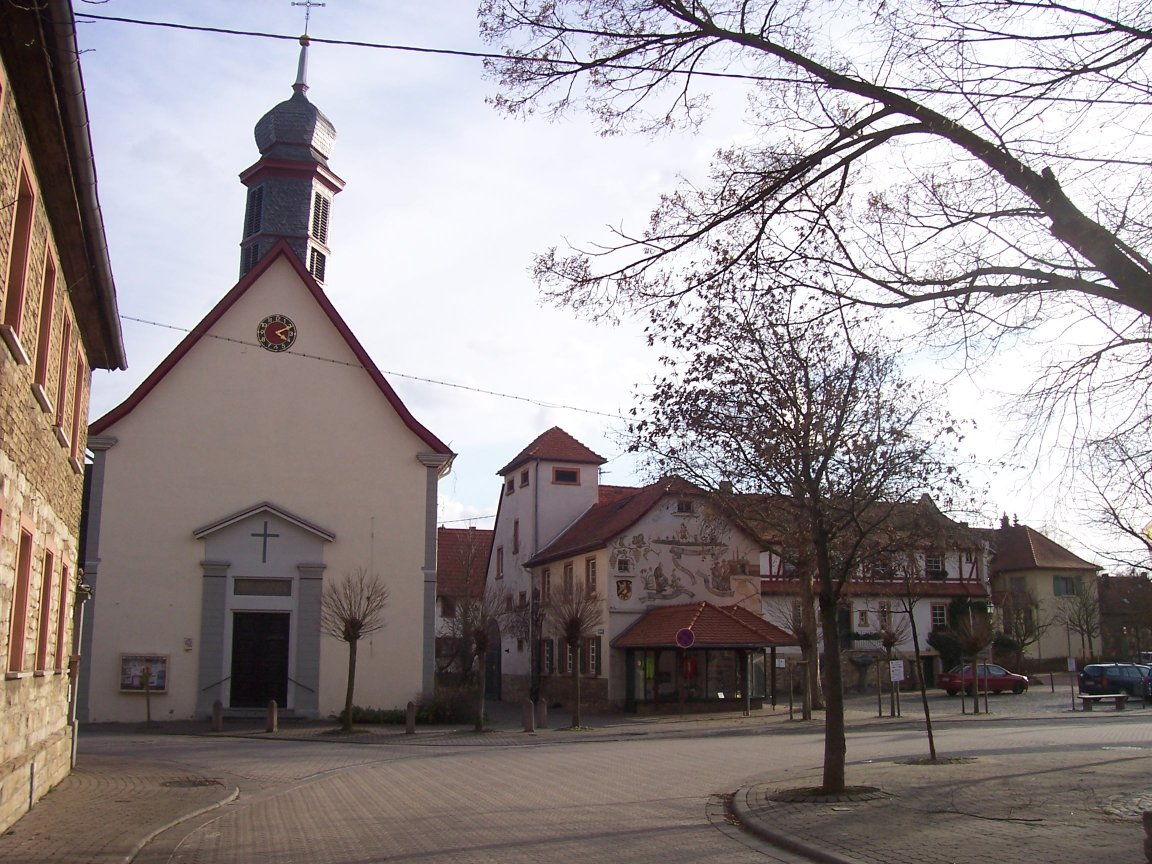
Church in Undenheim

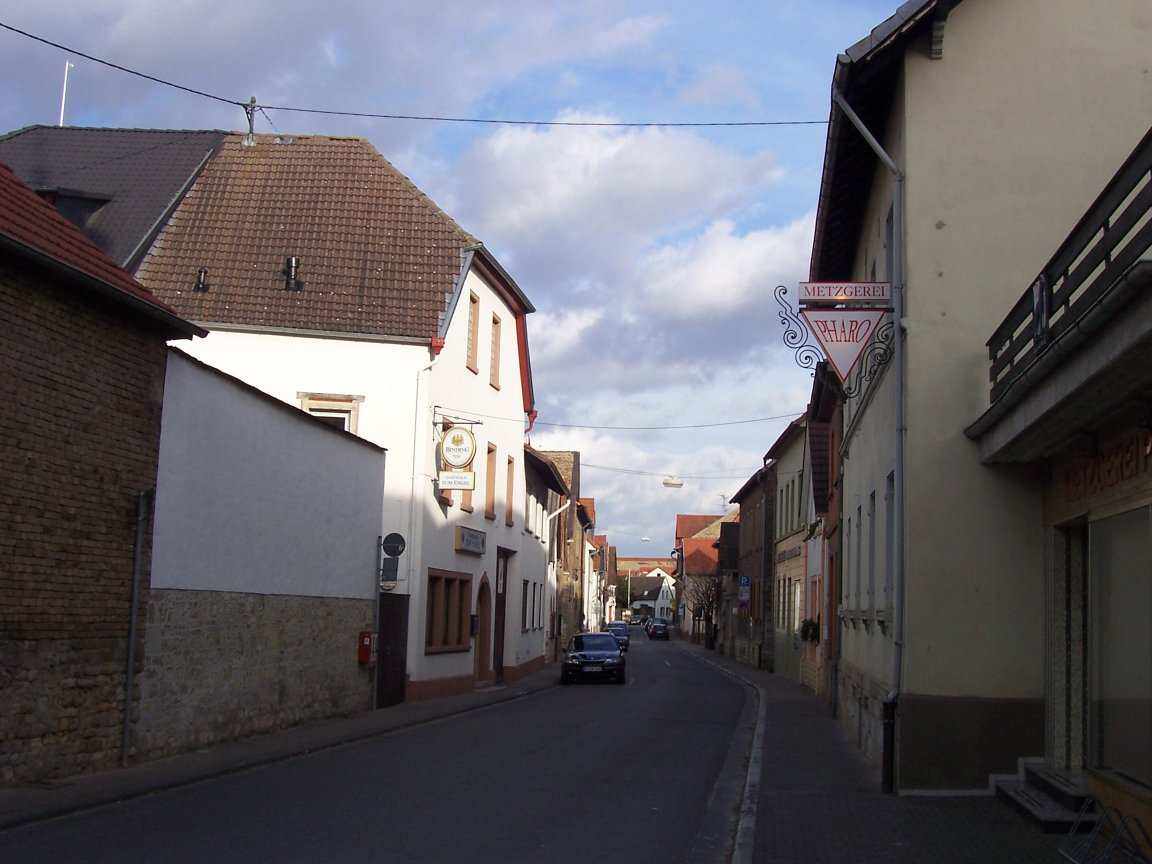
Street with inn and butcher's shop

Undenheim (German pronunciation: [ˈʊndn̩haɪm]) is an Ortsgemeinde – a municipality belonging to a Verbandsgemeinde, a kind of collective municipality – in the Mainz-Bingen district in Rhineland-Palatinate, Germany. It belongs to the Verbandsgemeinde Rhein-Selz, whose seat is in Oppenheim.

== Geography ==
=== Location ===
The municipality lies in Rhenish Hesse between Mainz and Worms.

=== Neighbouring municipalities ===
These are Bechtolsheim, Gabsheim, Friesenheim, Köngernheim and Schornsheim.

== Politics ==
=== Municipal council ===
- BfU - Bürger für Undenheim
- UFL - Undenheimer Freie Liste
- WLU - Lebenswertes Undenheim e. V.
- SPD - Social Democratic Party of Germany
- CDU - Christian Democratic Union of Germany

=== Mayor ===
The current mayor is Marcus Becker of the citizens’ party Undenheimer freie Liste (UfL).

=== Town partnerships ===
- Blaisy-Bas, Côte-d'Or, France
- Dolcè, Province of Verona, Veneto, Italy

== Culture and sightseeing ==
In 2003, Undenheim was chosen as “Rhenish Hesse’s loveliest village”.

== Famous people ==
=== Sons and daughters of the town ===
- Ludwig Schwamb (1890–1945) member of the Kreisau Circle
