= Nierstein =

- Town
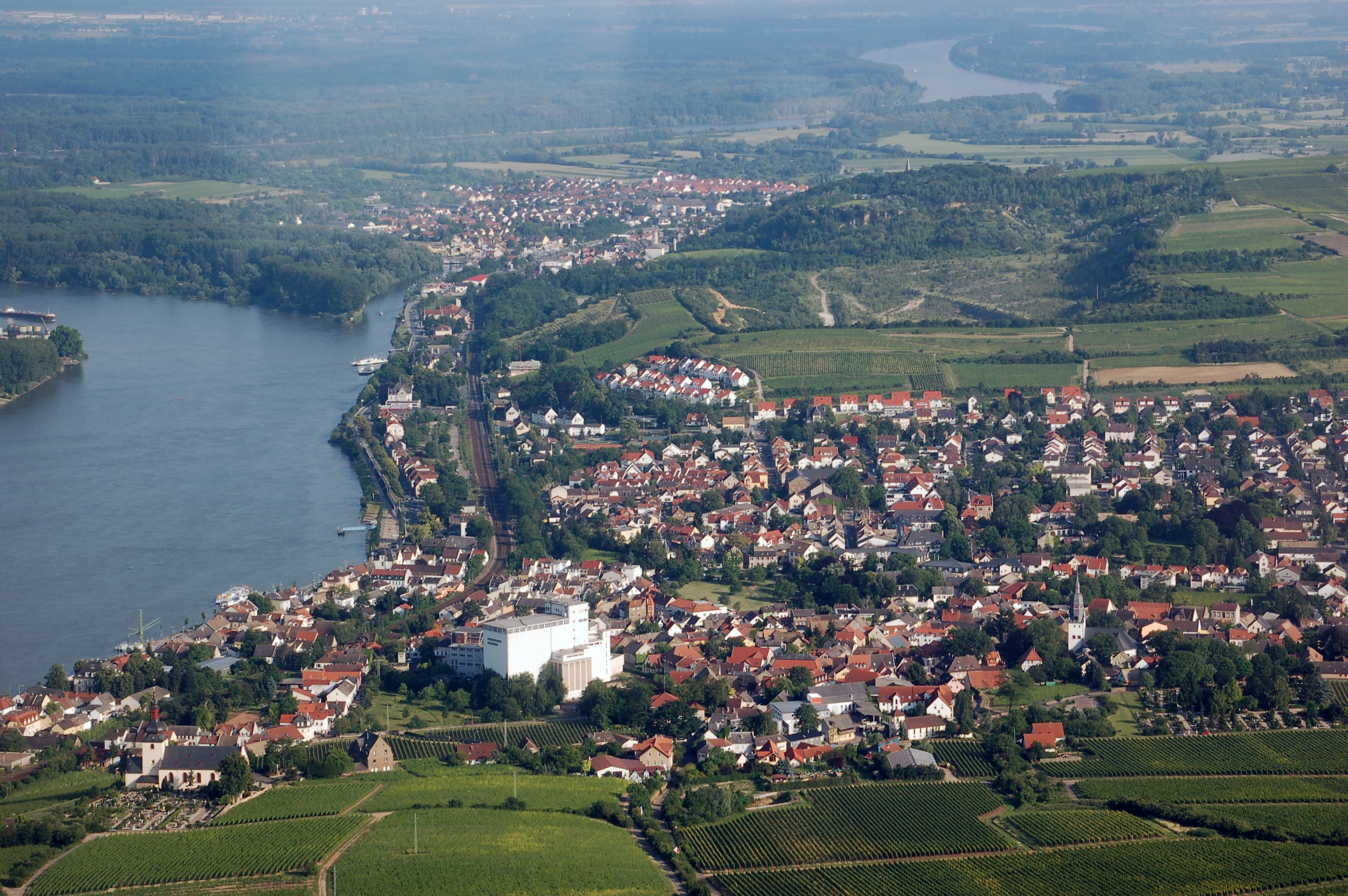
- Aerial view

- Coat of arms

- Location of Nierstein within Mainz-Bingen district
- Interactive map of Nierstein
- Location within Germany Location within Rhineland-Palatinate
- Coordinates: 49°52′10″N 8°20′15″E
- Country: Germany
- State: Rhineland-Palatinate
- District: Mainz-Bingen
- Municipal assoc.: Rhein-Selz
- Subdivisions: 2

Government
  - Mayor (2024–29): Jochen Schmitt (FW)

Area
  - Total: 19.34 km^{2} (7.47 sq mi)
- Elevation: 84 m (276 ft)

Population (2025-12-31)
  - Total: 8,080
  - Density: 418/km^{2} (1,080/sq mi)
- Time zone: UTC+01:00 (CET)
  - Summer (DST): UTC+02:00 (CEST)
- Postal codes: 55283
- Dialling codes: 06133
- Vehicle registration: MZ
- Website: www.nierstein.de

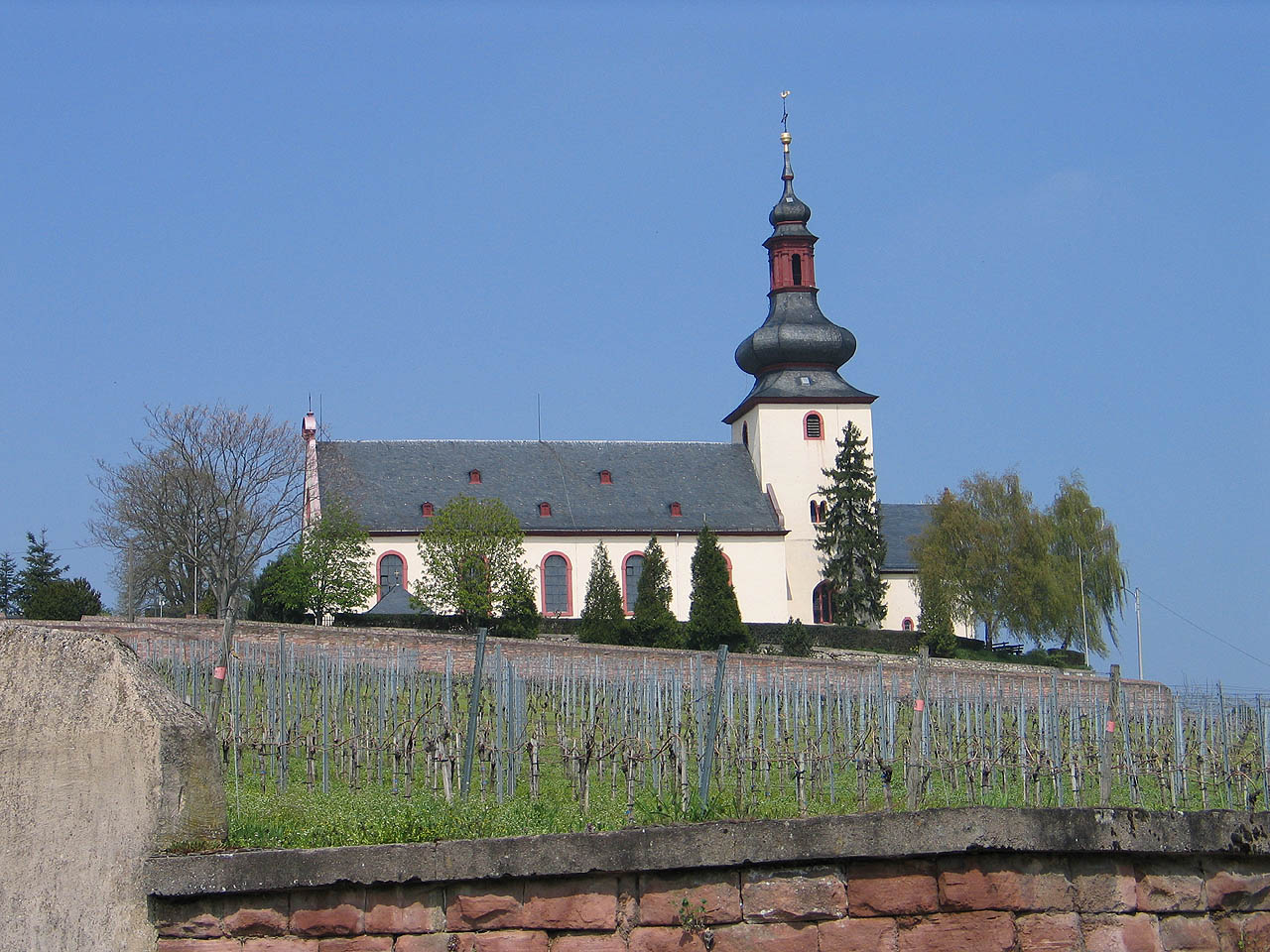
Saint Kilian's Church in the vineyard

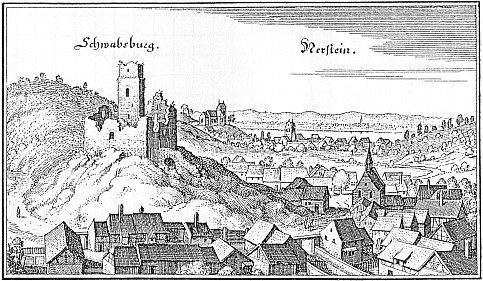
View of Schwabsburg and Nierstein after Merian

Nierstein (German pronunciation: [ˈniːɐ̯ʃtaɪn]) is a town belonging to the Verbandsgemeinde Rhein-Selz in the Mainz-Bingen district in Rhineland-Palatinate, Germany.

== Geography ==
=== Location ===
Nierstein lies in Rhenish Hesse on the Rhine between Mainz and Worms. In Nierstein the Flügelsbach empties into the Rhine.

=== Neighbouring municipalities ===
Nierstein's neighbours are Dexheim, Dienheim, Nackenheim and Oppenheim.

=== Geology ===
Around Nierstein Permian deposits (Rotliegend times) crop out in which 290,000,000-year-old animal tracks can be made out.

Above Nierstein lies a hillside vineyard described as a “Red Slope”, made as it is a part of the Rotliegend, which stretches from northern Nackenheim to western Schwabsburg.

== History ==
Two thousand years ago on Nierstein's current site stood a Roman settlement bearing the name Bauconica Nova. In 742, Nierstein had its first documentary mention. The occasion was the donation of a church and a vineyard to the Bistum Würzburg by the Majordomo (mayor of the palace) Carolman son of Charles Martel. The Glöck that was herein mentioned is said to be the oldest vineyard complex mentioned in a document in Germany. In 1451, vineyards owned by the Counts of Katzenelnbogen in der Walpe were mentioned.

=== Amalgamations ===
- Sundheim (16th Century)

In the Middle Ages the village Sundheim (or "Suntheym") was located south (Old High German sunt = "south") of Nierstein. Today this place lies inside the old centre of Nierstein near to a brook called "Flügelsbach". The street name "Hinter Sundheim" (about: "Behind Sundheim") still reflects this village.

- Schwabsburg (1 July 1970)

The name Schwabsburg was transferred from the castle of the same name to the settlement that already existed there then. The castle was held by the Staufer emperors, whose home was in Swabia. In the Middle Ages, the villages of Dexheim, Schwabsburg and Nierstein formed a municipality administered by the Nierstein knightly court. The municipality had Imperial immediacy.

After 1400 this place came under the Electorate of the Palatinate lordship and thereby lost its Imperial freedom.

On 22 March 1945, Nierstein was liberated by the 3. U.S. Army under command of General Patton, ending the dictatorship of the Nazi regime there.

== Politics ==
Today is Nierstein part of the State of Mid-Palatinate (Rheinland Pfalz), under its actual Minister of the State Mrs. Malu Dreyer (SPD).

The actual Mayor of the City of Nierstein is Mr. Jochen Schmitt (FWG) since the latest election of 2019.

=== Town partnerships ===
- Gevrey-Chambertin, Côte-d'Or, France since 1 September 1963
- (Germany) Freyburg, Burgenlandkreis, Saxony-Anhalt

=== Coat of arms ===
The municipality's arms might be described thus: Or an eagle displayed sable armed, langued and beaked gules, each side of his neck a mullet of six of the last.

The municipality's earliest known seal dates from 1272 and shows very much what the current arms show, namely the Imperial Eagle. The two mullets (star shapes) serve to differentiate these arms from others, the Imperial Eagle being a reasonably common charge; however, on some later seals, the mullets are dropped. Otherwise, the arms have not undergone many changes since the 13th century.

== Culture and sightseeing ==
=== Museums ===
The amateur palaeontologists Arnulf Stapf (father) and Harald Stapf (son) show in the Paläontologisches Museum Nierstein, which they themselves built up, rare footprints of insects, amphibians and reptiles from the Permian period, as well as fossils from throughout the world. Since some of the specimens are unique, this institution is eagerly frequented by international specialists.

=== Buildings ===
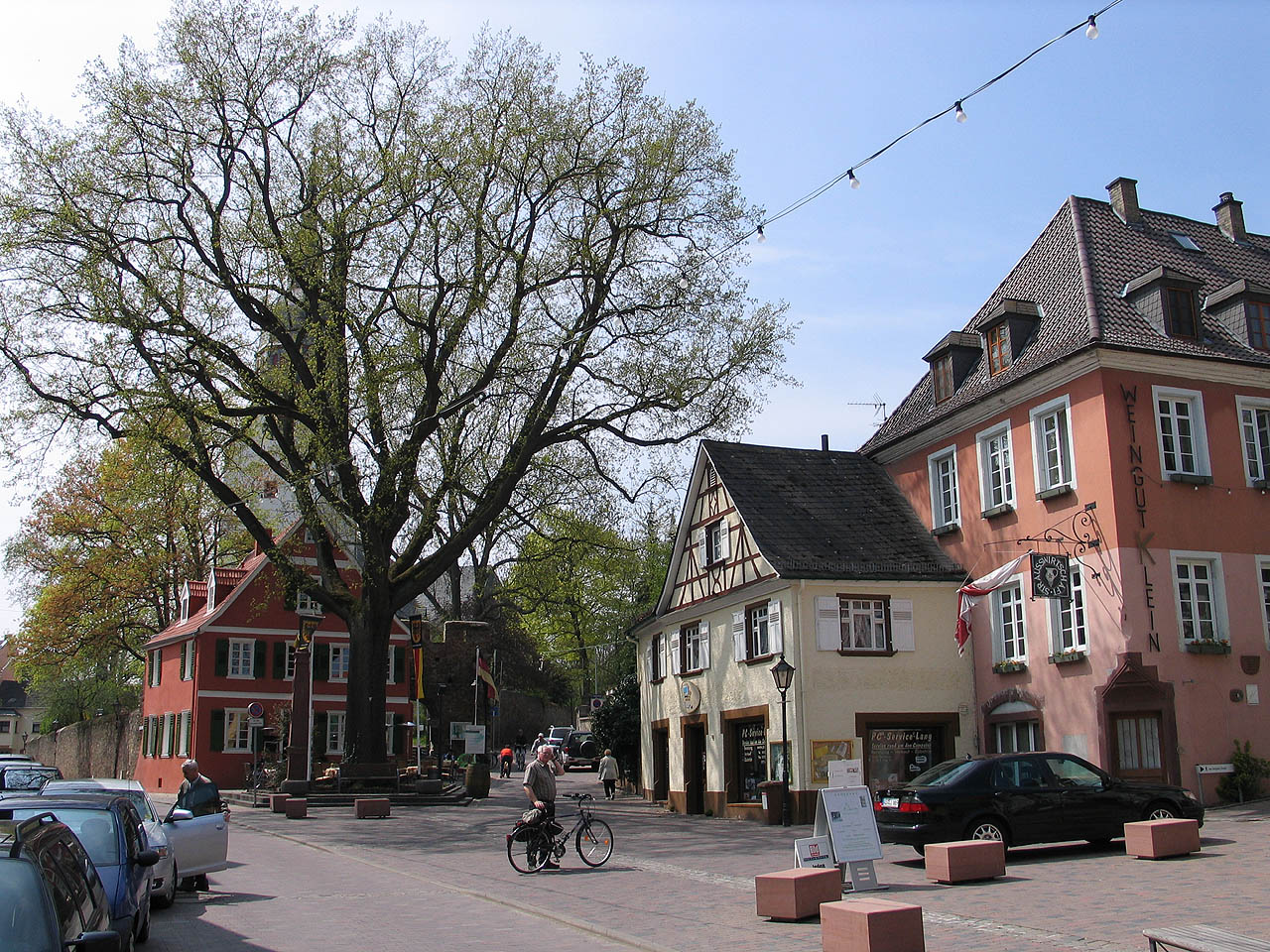
Marketplace

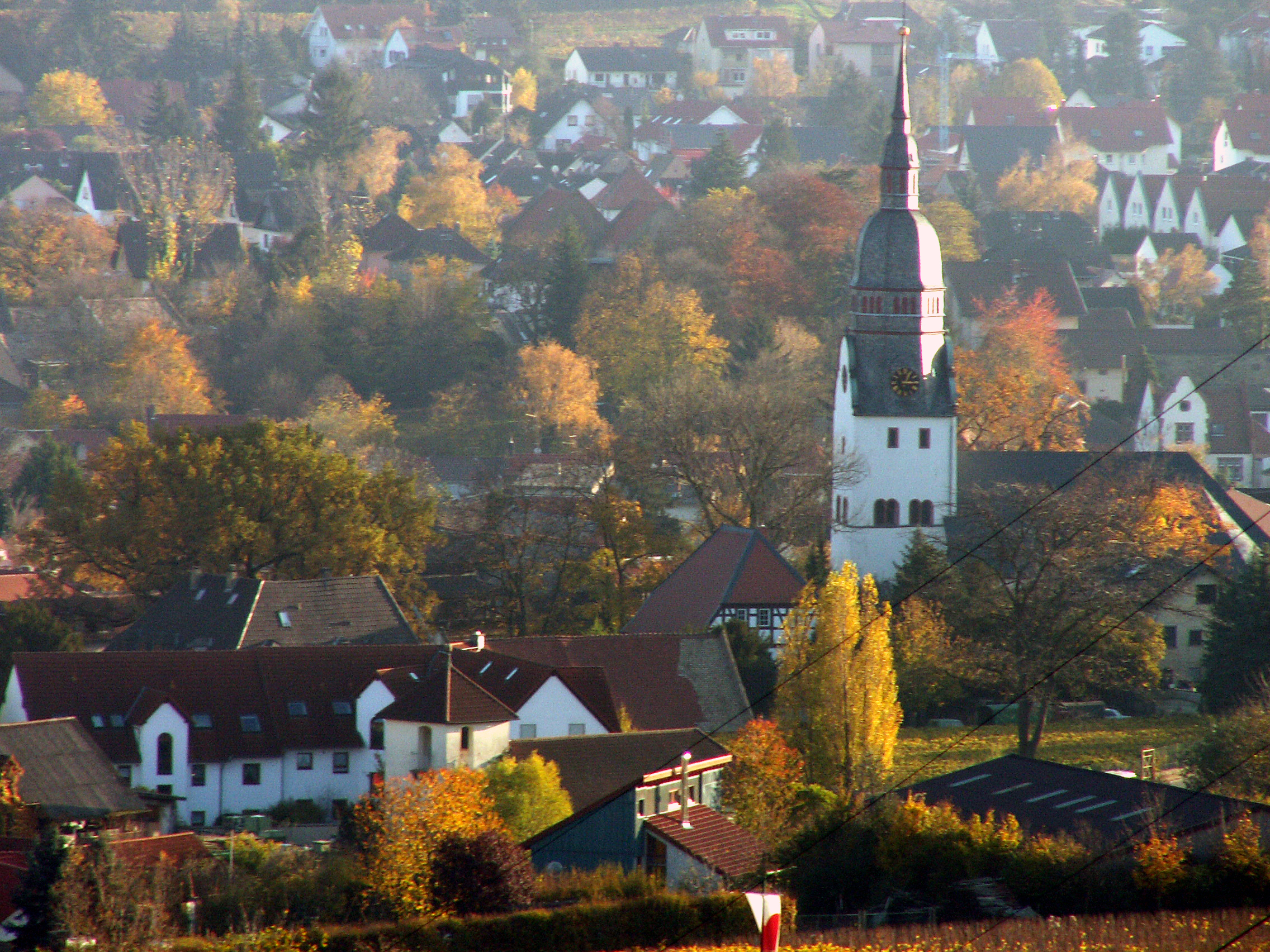
View from the “Red Slope” towards Saint Martin's Church

Municipal core and noble estates: The once Free Imperial Village’s old downtown core is made up of the triad of marketplace, manorial estate and temple estate that Saint Martin’s Evangelical Church, surrounded by a defensive wall, borders, and on whose lands once stood the Frankish administrative centre, the Carolingian royal palace and the Ottonian royal court. Baroque noble estates define the streetscape and recall a mediaeval epoch in Nierstein’s local history when some two dozen noble families lived here as Imperially immediate fiefholders who shaped events by holding the office of Vogt, Schultheiß or Burgmannen, as Schöffen (roughly “lay jurists”) at the knightly court or the ecclesiastical court. The estates were and still are mostly linked together and with the royal court through a branching underground system of defence works. To be stressed from among these are the former noble houses of the Barons of Knebel or Hundt von Saulheim (oldest timber-frame house) as well as those of the families Knebel von Katzenelnbogen and Waldbott von Bassenheim, the Metternich’sche Hof (oldest estate complex), the Haxthäuser Hof (a Baroque manor belonging to the family Haxthausen), the gateway arch and wing of the Schloss von der Leyen and the Dalberg-Herding’sche Schloss (in the house chapel there are wall and ceiling paintings by Jakob Götzenberger in Nazarene style worth seeing).

Above the municipality, the watchtower is the highest viewpoint in the vineyards. It was built using stones from the old Königsstuhl between Nierstein and Lörzweiler, where in 1024 the conclave of princes elected Conrad II as the first Salian to sit on the German throne. Saint Kilian’s Catholic Church, which can be seen far afield, perched upon a hill rising up at the Rhine valley, defines Nierstein’s skyline, although this is also marred somewhat by a former malthouse’s tall buildings. Plans are, however, afoot to have the old malthouse torn down and the lands redeveloped, thereby also opening the old Dalberg-Herdingsche Schloss on the malthouse’s grounds – or at least the residence’s house chapel, which is worth seeing – back up to visitors.

Sironabad: In 1802 remnants of a roughly 2,000-year-old Celtic-Roman spring sanctuary of goddess Sirona on the municipality’s southern edge near the railway crossing at the former quarry. The Belgian salesman Martin van der Velden leased the lands, had the four springs (two freshwater, two mineral water, of which one had a mineral content comparable to the recognized healing spring on the south slope of the Taunus near Weilbach) housed under a roof in a building shielded against flooding that served as a taproom, and he sold the water in Germany, Belgium, the Netherlands and even the United Kingdom.

In the digs, besides the Roman spring complex, a votive altar was unearthed. This had been endowed by a Roman officer’s daughter, Julia Frontina, as thanks to the Celtic goddess Sirona and god Grannus (corresponding to the Roman god Apollo) for being healed.

Furthermore, a stone basin was also found with coins that had become sheathed in plaster over the ages. These, however, showed no sign of wear and had apparently been cast into the spring by healed guests. The mintages came from various emperors’ reigns: Domitian (86), Nerva (98), Trajan (100 and 112), Hadrian (118 and 119), Antoninus Pius (145), Gordian III (239–244), Postumus (267) and Marcia Otacilia Severa, Emperor Philip the Arab’s wife. It can therefore be inferred that the Romans were using the springs at least from AD 86 on into the 3rd century.

Near Nierstein on the other side of the Rhine, not far from the Kornsand-Geinsheim linking road, at 49°52′11″N 8°23′1″E, is a transmission facility for SWR’s VHF broadcasts consisting of a 138 m-tall guyed steel-lattice mast with a triangular cross-section. This mast was originally part of the Bodenseesender directional antenna at Meßkirch-Rohrdorf, which was dismantled in the 1970s and reassembled in Nierstein in 1981.

Next to the Kornsand Rhine Ferry Crossing is the Kornsand memorial located Kornsandverbrechen. It was established to commemorate five citizens of the City of Nierstein that were executed by Nazis on 21 March 1945, less than 24 hours before the Liberation of Nierstein on 22 March 1945 by U.S. troops of the 3. U.S. Army.

=== Clubs and Associations ===
Nierstein’s biggest club is Turnverein Nierstein 1901 e.V. (gymnastics) with more than 1,200 members. Worthy of mention is the dance troupe “Magic Fire” (so-called even in German), which in 2005 won not only the title of Rhineland-Palatinate champion but also German champion and European champion in the category Exhibition Dance Character Youth. Likewise successful is the club's first team in the team handball department, who in the 2006/2007 season took the district league championship and thereby advanced to the Verbandsliga.

The community of Nierstein-Schwabsburg offers opportunities to pursue hobbies in multiple clubs.

Particularly worth mentioning here are 1. FC Schwabsburg 1958 e.V. (association football) – which has put the stress on youth work – Turnverein 1903 Schwabsburg (gymnastics) and Männergesangverein 1884 Schwabsburg (men's singing). Even the Nierstein YMCA is strongly represented in youth work and even offers its own sport and music work.

The Historical Association of Nierstein (Geschichtsverein Nierstein e.V.) is beside of the Turnverein the largest Association by members at Nierstein (275 members in June 2020). President is Mr. Hexember, member of the City of Nierstein Parliament (SPD).

=== Regular events ===
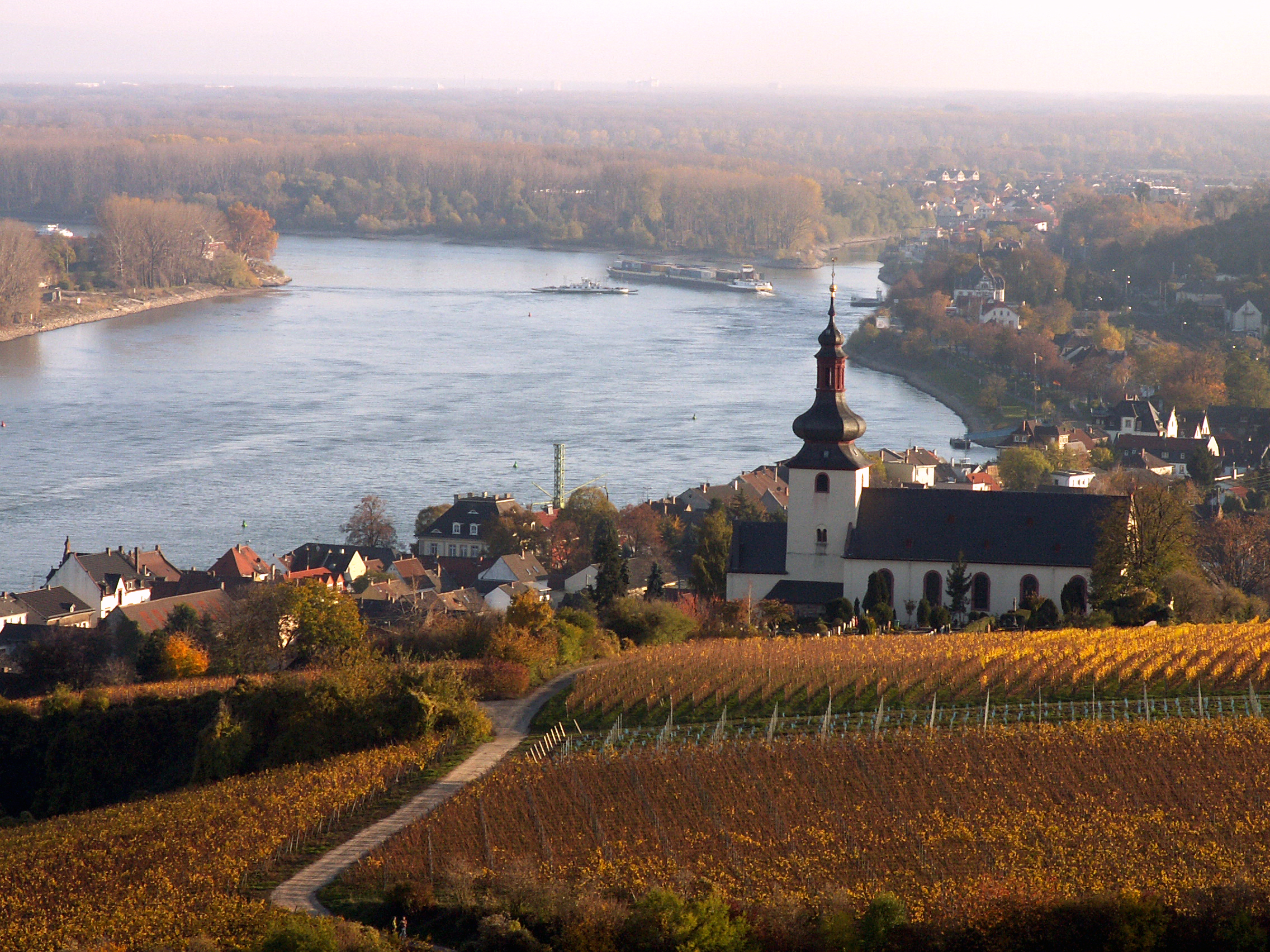
View from the “Red Slope” towards Saint Kilian's Church and the river Rhine

Each year on the first weekend in August, the Winegrowers’ Festival (Winzerfest) is held. Until a few years ago it was well known beyond the region for an historical “wine village” built on the marketplace in the form of a big castle. In the late 1990s, however, the needed renovation to these buildings was dismissed on financial grounds and the festival's appearance gradually came to resemble other wine festivals in the region with many single wine stands.

On every weekend of the season, but above all on festival weekends, tourist vineyard tours are conducted. As an extra for those on these tours, groups of up to 14 guests are driven by tractor to the vineyards on the “Red Slope”, while being given the opportunity on the way to sample the slope's wine as part of the Weck, Worscht un Woi (“buns, sausage and wine” in Rhine Franconian dialect). According to the traffic regulations (Straßenverkehrs-Ordnung§ 21 Abs. 2), these outings are, strictly speaking, forbidden by law as the vehicles involved are not supposed to carry anyone but those employed in agriculture or forestry, and the maximum number is supposed to be 8, not 14. Nevertheless, and the several accidents that have happened in other regions notwithstanding, these tours are tolerated.

21 March is the annual wreath-laying ceremony at the Kornsand memorial Kornsandverbrechen, in respect of the five citizens of Nierstein executed by Nazis on 21 March 1945.

22 March is the annual commemoration at the Rhine-Crossing memorial at Nierstein. The memorial inauguration was in 2017 and it is dedicated to the 249th Combat Engineers Battalion, 3. U. S. Army that crossed the Rhine here on 22 March 1945, at 2200 hrs. Within two weeks more than 60,000 Military Vehicles crossed the Rhine at Nierstein on the way into the heart of the Reich. Due to Military experts helped this Operation, known as "Operation Silent Crossing" to end the war in Europe months earlier than the Allied Command (S.H.A.E.F) had planned, saving thousands of lives on both sides.

==== Yearly events in the wine season ====
- Early May: Maypole festival
- Mid-May: wine festival and kermis (church consecration festival, locally known as the Kerb) in the outlying centre of Schwabsburg
- Mid-June: wine presentation at the Roter Hang (“Red Slope”) vineyard
- Early July: International Cultural festival
- Early August: Historical Winegrowers’ Festival
- Early September: Nierstein Kerb and wine festival
- Mid-September: open-house days at the wineries and wine cellars

The exact dates are listed .

=== Culinary specialities ===
Wingertsknorze (rye rolls with caraway), Fleischworscht (“meat sausage” similar to bologna), Worschtsupp (“sausage soup”) and Rieslingsupp, Spundekäs and Handkäs mit Musik (two kinds of cheese) are the best known representatives of the regional cooking. Moreover, various wineries offer a comprehensive selection of regional dishes in their Strausswirtschaften.

== Economy and infrastructure ==
=== Winegrowing ===
Nierstein is characterized to a considerable extent by winegrowing, and with 783 ha of vineyard, of which 75.6% is used for white wine varieties and 24.4% for red, Nierstein is, after Worms (1 490 ha), Rhenish Hesse’s biggest winegrowing centre, and Rhineland-Palatinate's sixth biggest. The municipality is also the local winegrowing region's namesake.

See also:

- Niersteiner Glöck, the oldest appellation in Germany.
- Hipping vineyard of the red slope
- Weingut St. Antony
- Weingut Louis Guntrum, the oldest vineyard at Nierstein.

=== Tourism ===
The municipality's second biggest field of economic endeavour is tourism, catering to hikers and cyclists as well as day visitors. The outlying centre of Nierstein-Schwabsburg currently counts 7 hotels and 24 guesthouses (pensions), many of which are housed in renovated wineries.

=== Transport ===
Bundesstraße 9 runs through Nierstein and is closed to long-distance trucks in the town. Bundesstraße 420 also begins here. Nierstein lies on the Mainz–Ludwigshafen railway line, and has a centrally located railway station.

Rhine-ferry connection between Nierstein and the Kornsand by the Rheinfähre Landskrone.

== Famous people ==
- Johann Wilhelm Wernher (b. 1767; d. 1827 in Nierstein) was a government councillor, mayor, lawyer, privy councillor and court president, and a winegrower in Nierstein. He was well known as the judge at Schinderhannes’s trial. In 1804 he acquired the Rodensteiner/Haxthäuser Hof and made it into his family seat in Rhenish Hesse. Among Johann Wilhelm Wernher's offspring, many were active in Rhenish-Hessian historical research, particularly in Nierstein and Oppenheim.

=== Sons and daughters of the town ===
- Philipp Wilhelm Wernher (b. 12 January 1802 in Nierstein; d. 6 October 1887 in Nierstein), Johann Wilhelm Wernher's son, was a Hessian liberal politician and winegrower, as well as Heinrich von Gagern’s comrade in arms, member of the Hesse-Darmstadt Estates, the Vorparlament (a body convened to prepare for the Frankfurt Parliament), the Frankfurt Parliament and the Erfurt Union Parliament, district councillor in the Oppenheim district and director of the Darmstädter Staatsschuldentilgungskasse (an institution for clearing state debt). He was also member of the Hessian First Chamber.
- D. Theo Sorg, (b. 11. March 1929 in Nierstein), Evangelical clergyman and from 1988 to 1994 Presiding Bishop of the Evangelical-Lutheran Church in Württemberg
- Ernst-Günter Brinkmann (b. 1943), Member of the Rhineland-Palatinate Landtag from 1987 to 2006
- Rhenish-Hessian Wine Queens:
  - Heike Schmitt, 1977/1978 and also 30th German Wine Queen, 1978/1979
  - Lisa Bunn, 2008/2009
