= Hahnheim =

- Municipality
- Coat of arms

- Location of Hahnheim within Mainz-Bingen district
- Interactive map of Hahnheim
- Location within Germany Location within Rhineland-Palatinate
- Coordinates: 49°51′38″N 8°14′12″E
- Country: Germany
- State: Rhineland-Palatinate
- District: Mainz-Bingen
- Municipal assoc.: Rhein-Selz

Government
  - Mayor (2019–24): Werner Kalbfuß (SPD)

Area
  - Total: 6.39 km^{2} (2.47 sq mi)
- Elevation: 124 m (407 ft)

Population (2025-12-31)
  - Total: 1,650
  - Density: 258/km^{2} (669/sq mi)
- Time zone: UTC+01:00 (CET)
  - Summer (DST): UTC+02:00 (CEST)
- Postal codes: 55278
- Dialling codes: 06737
- Vehicle registration: MZ
- Website: www.hahnheim.de

Hahnheim (German pronunciation: [ˈhaːnhaɪm]) is an Ortsgemeinde – a municipality belonging to a Verbandsgemeinde, a kind of collective municipality – in the Mainz-Bingen district in Rhineland-Palatinate, Germany.

== Geography ==
=== Location ===
Hahnheim lies between Mainz and Worms on the river Selz. The winegrowing centre belongs to the Verbandsgemeinde Rhein-Selz, whose seat is in Oppenheim.

== Politics ==
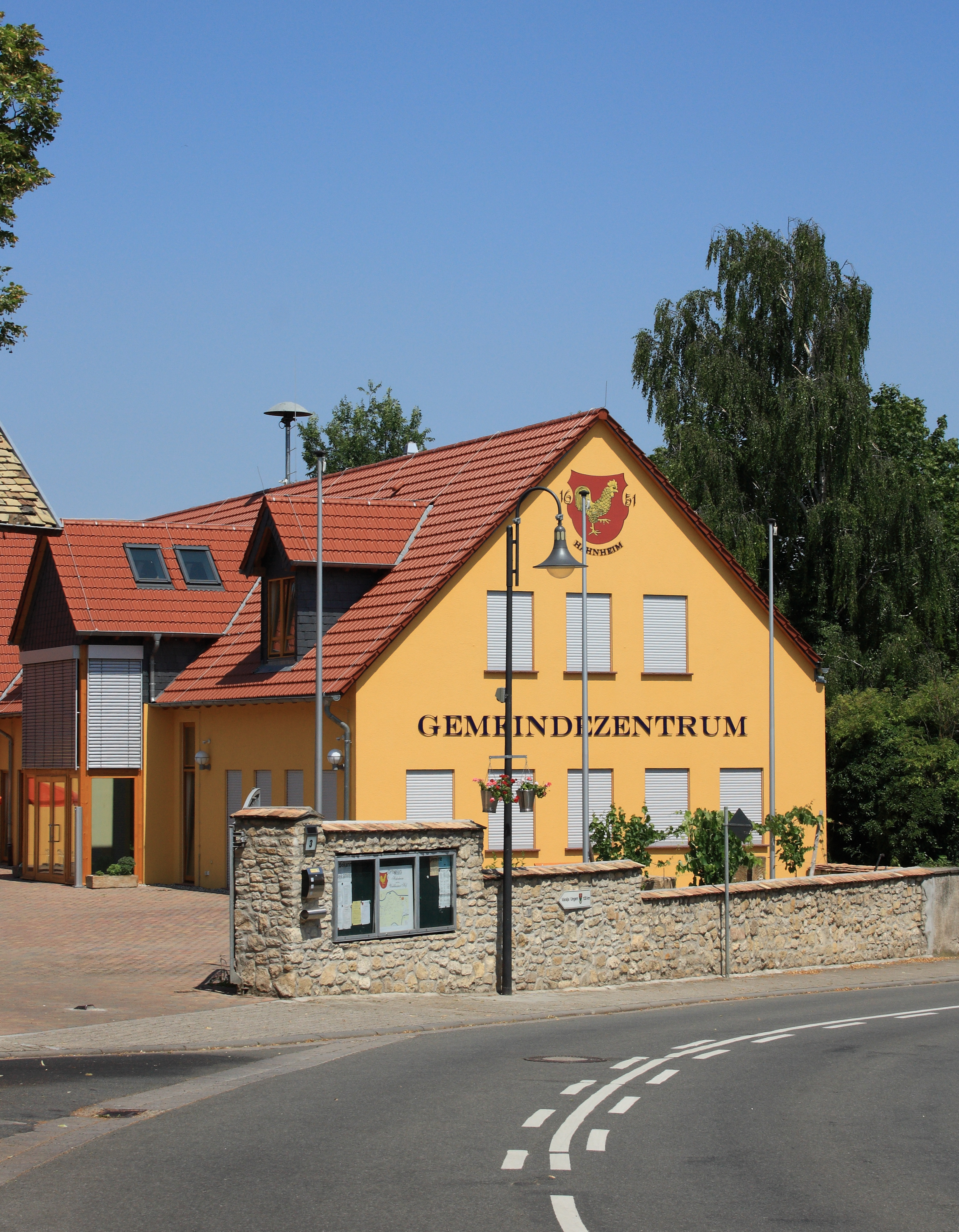
Hahnheim Town Hall

=== Municipal council ===
The council is made up of 17 council members, counting the part-time mayor, with seats apportioned thus:

	CDU	SPD	WGH	Total
2024	6	10	7	16

(as at the municipal election held on 9 June 2024)

=== Coat of arms ===
The municipality's arms might be described as thus: Per fess gules and argent, a cock repassant counterchanged.

== Culture and sightseeing ==
=== Jewish graveyard ===
In the countryside towards Köngernheim on the highway going towards Bundesstraße 420 is an old Jewish graveyard.

=== Biotopes ===
In the countryside, especially along the Selz and on the former Alzey–Bodenheim railway right-of-way – the “Amiche” – several biotopes have been established.

== Economy and infrastructure ==
=== Transport ===
The municipality is crossed by the L 432 state road. Bundesstraße 420 lies 2 km to the south. The A 60 and A 63 autobahns can be reached by car in 20 and 10 minutes respectively.
