= Guntersblum =

- Municipality
- Flag Coat of arms

- Location of Guntersblum within Mainz-Bingen district
- Interactive map of Guntersblum
- Location within Germany Location within Rhineland-Palatinate
- Coordinates: 49°47′50″N 8°20′44″E
- Country: Germany
- State: Rhineland-Palatinate
- District: Mainz-Bingen
- Municipal assoc.: Rhein-Selz

Government
  - Mayor (2019–24): Claudia Bläsius-Wirth (CDU)

Area
  - Total: 16.71 km^{2} (6.45 sq mi)
- Elevation: 88 m (289 ft)

Population (2025-12-31)
  - Total: 3,942
  - Density: 235.9/km^{2} (611.0/sq mi)
- Time zone: UTC+01:00 (CET)
  - Summer (DST): UTC+02:00 (CEST)
- Postal codes: 67583
- Dialling codes: 06249
- Vehicle registration: MZ
- Website: www.guntersblum.de

Guntersblum (German pronunciation: [ˈɡʊntɐsblʊm]) is an Ortsgemeinde—a municipality belonging to a Verbandsgemeinde, a kind of collective municipality—in the Frankfurt/Rhine-Main Metropolitan Region in the Mainz-Bingen district in Rhineland-Palatinate, Germany.

== Geography ==
=== Location ===
Guntersblum lies on the Rhine’s left bank between Mainz and Worms, right on the Mainz–Ludwigshafen railway line, and roughly 25 km south of Mainz.

The municipality’s total area is 1 668 ha, 1 373 ha of which is given over to agriculture and forestry, and 550 ha of this is used for winegrowing. Winegrowing areas include Guntersblumer Vögelsgärten and Oppenheimer Krötenbrunnen while individual vineyards are Steinberg, Authental, Steigterassen, Bornpfad, Kreuzkapelle, Eiserne Hand, St. Julianenbrunnen and Sonnenhang.

== History ==
=== 9th to 10th century ===
Between 830 and 850 Guntersblum, had its first documentary mention as Chunteres Frumere in the Lorsch codex: a kingly bondsman had to pay the royal court interest in the form of two Fuder (very roughly, 2 000 L) of wine. On 13 June 897 came the municipality’s first datable documentary mention, this time under the name Cundheresprumare (“Gunter’s Plum Garden”). In this document, King Zwentibold confirmed to the monks at Saint Maximin's Abbey at Trier that they had holdings at their disposal in Guntersblum. Between 922 and 927, the Archbishop of Cologne endowed this monastery to the Holy Virgins and Saint Ursula’s Monastery in Cologne with holdings, among other things several arpents of fields in Guntersblum.

=== 13th to 18th century ===
In 1215, the Xanten Monastery leased its income from the church at Guntersblum (yearly 12 Fuder of wine, 100 Malter of rye and 50 Malter of wheat) to the knight Herbord von Albig and his son Cuselin. In 1237, the Monastery sold the church patronage rights and the whole of its holdings in Guntersblum to the Worms Cathedral Monastery. The goods were shared between the brothers Friedrich III of Leiningen and Emich IV of Leiningen-Landeck. The latter acquired the Electoral-Cologne feudal estate in Guntersblum. Before 1242, Friedrich III of Leiningen was enfeoffed by the Archbishops of Cologne (the village’s owners) with the Vogtei over Guntersblum. Beginning then, Guntersblum remained under Leiningen lordship and belonged until 1316 to the House of Leiningen:

until 1466 to the House of Leiningen-Hardenburg.
until 1572 to the House of Leiningen-Dagsburg-Hardenburg.
until 1658 to the House of Leiningen-Dagsburg-Falkenburg (in Heidesheim).
until 1766 to the House of Leiningen-Dagsburg-Falkenburg in Guntersblum.
until 1787 to the House of Leiningen-Dagsburg-Hardenburg.
from 1787 to the House of Leiningen-Guntersblum.
late 1797 – End of Leiningen lordship; Rhine’s left bank annexed to France.

A document now at the University of Pennsylvania Libraries shows a succession of Jewish private tutorship in Guntersblum as early as 1742.

=== 19th century ===
In 1814 and 1815 came the Congress of Vienna and along with it, the end of French rule. In 1815 and 1816, the Province of Rhenish Hesse (Rheinhessen) came into being and was annexed to the Grand Duchy of Hesse, thereby making Guntersblum Hessian. In 1828 and 1829, work on straightening the Rhine was done, part of which involved the creation of the Kühkopf (“Cow’s Head”), an island, formerly joined to the left bank as the land inside an oxbow. In 1852, Guntersblum became part of the new Oppenheim district. In 1853, the Hessische Ludwigsbahn (railway) from Mainz to Worms was built.

=== 20th century ===
In 1930, the last occupation troops from the First World War left Guntersblum. In March 1945, American tank units rolled through Rhenish Hesse and also Guntersblum. After the Second World War, Guntersblum grew in the course of the great economic upswing throughout Germany to more than double its former size. Given the way the Allied occupiers set their occupation zones up, the Kühkopf area became part of Hesse. In 1969, Guntersblum was made part of the newly formed Regierungsbezirk of Rheinhessen-Pfalz and, within that, part of the newly formed Mainz-Bingen district. In 1972, Guntersblum became the seat of the like-named Verbandsgemeinde, which merged into the Verbandsgemeinde Rhein-Selz in 2014.

=== Religion ===
==== Evangelical parish ====
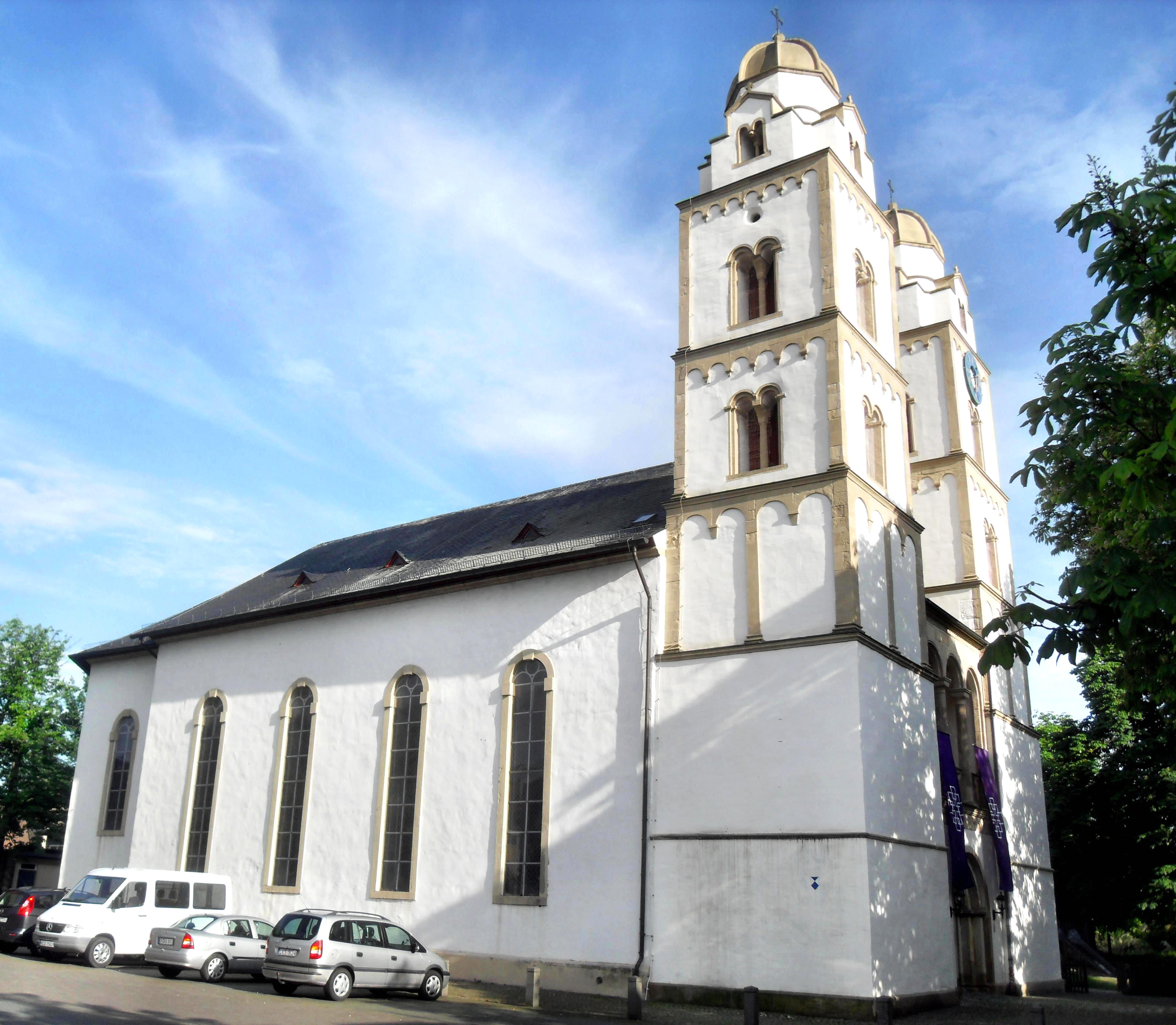
Evangelical church

The church was built about 1100 as a three-naved basilica with two towers. Then, the Xanten Monastery owned the church patronage rights and made Saint Viktor the church's patron saint. In 1617 and 1618, the nave was torn down because it was in an ill state of repair. In 1619, new building work began. Owing to the Thirty Years' War, the work on the new church was not finished until sometime between 1685 and 1688. In 1702, the south tower fell down. Its replacement is the one with the clock, built between 1839 and 1842. Both the church's towers are particularly noteworthy. The style of such eight-sided vaults on a square foundation most likely originated in Persia and further developed in 7th-century Armenia. This “Oriental relationship” has led to the towers being called the “Saracen Towers”. Towers in this style have only five representatives in Germany (compare Alsheim, Dittelsheim-Heßloch, St. Paulus (Worms), Wetzlar). Among the church's other peculiarities is the Gothic baptismal font. It is believed to date from about 1490 and is one of the so-called Lion Fonts (Löwentaufsteine).

==== Catholic parish, Saint Viktor’s ====
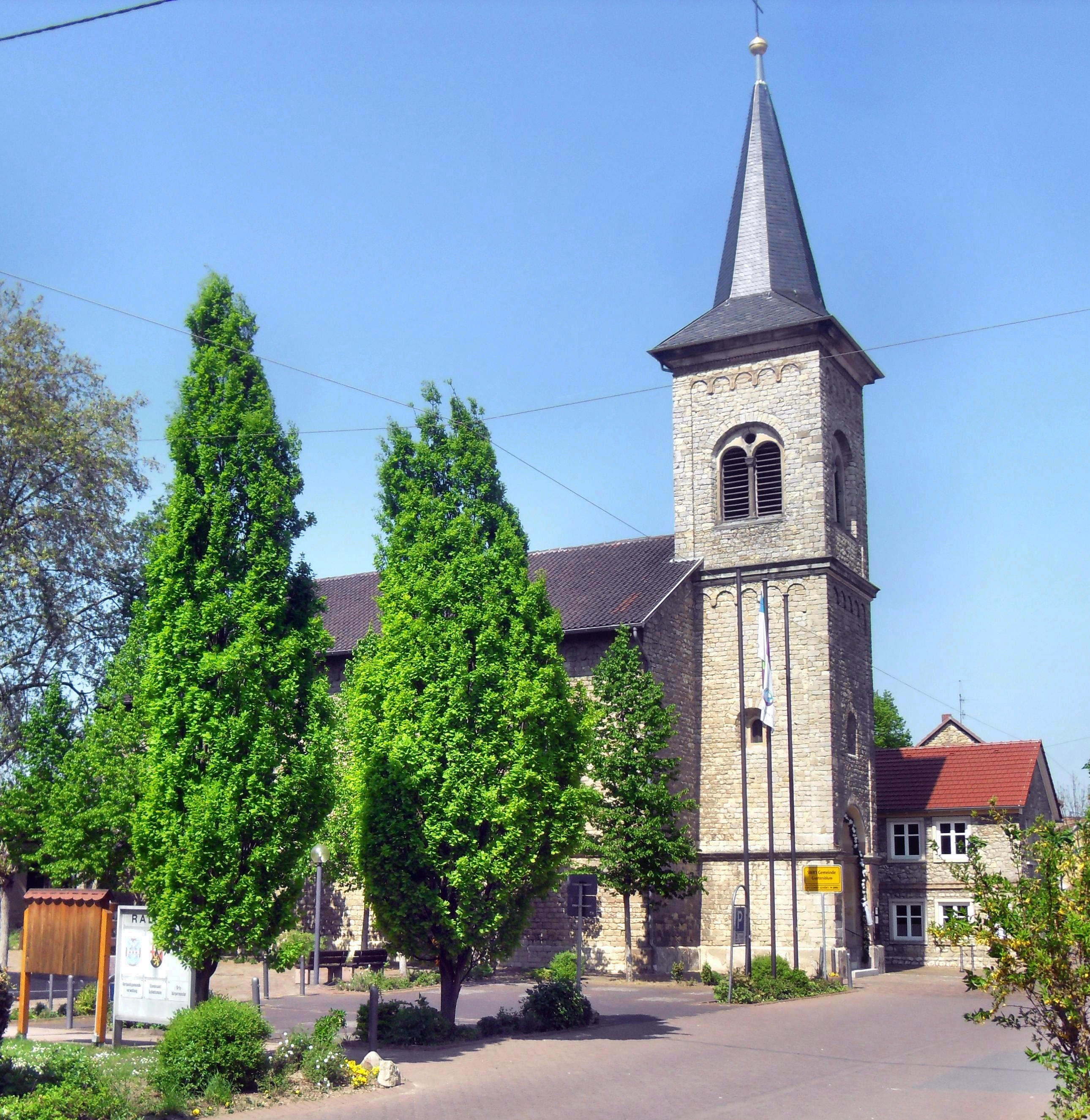
Catholic church

For some 100 years, the two denominations shared a house of worship. Eventually the civic community helped the Catholics build their own “Saint Viktor’s Church” (Sankt Viktorskirche) in 1844 and 1845. The church building went up on land belonging to the parish across the street from the Town Hall. The festive consecration was undertaken by Bishop Petrus Leopold Kaiser from Mainz on 16 November 1845. The consecration document hangs in the church's sacristy. In July 1965, the parish priest was able to move into the parish-owned rectory across from the Catholic Church. In 1982 and 1983, the Catholic parish built itself a parish hall, to a great extent through its own means and donations, which Canon Fahney dedicated on 13 March 1983.

The priest who has been leading the Guntersblum Catholic parish, Father Alphons Mohr, celebrated the 50th anniversary of his entry into the priesthood not long ago.

== Politics ==
=== Coat of arms ===
The municipality's arms might be described thus: Per fess azure an eagle displayed argent armed, beaked and langued gules, and argent a flowerpot of the first issuant from which five roses of the third slipped vert.

The eagle is the charge borne by the Counts of Leiningen. They held the village in fief for centuries and lived at the local castle. The roses are canting for part of the municipality's name (“flower” in German is Blume).

=== Town partnerships ===
- (Germany) Muldenstein, Anhalt-Bitterfeld, Saxony-Anhalt

== Culture and sightseeing ==
=== Museums ===
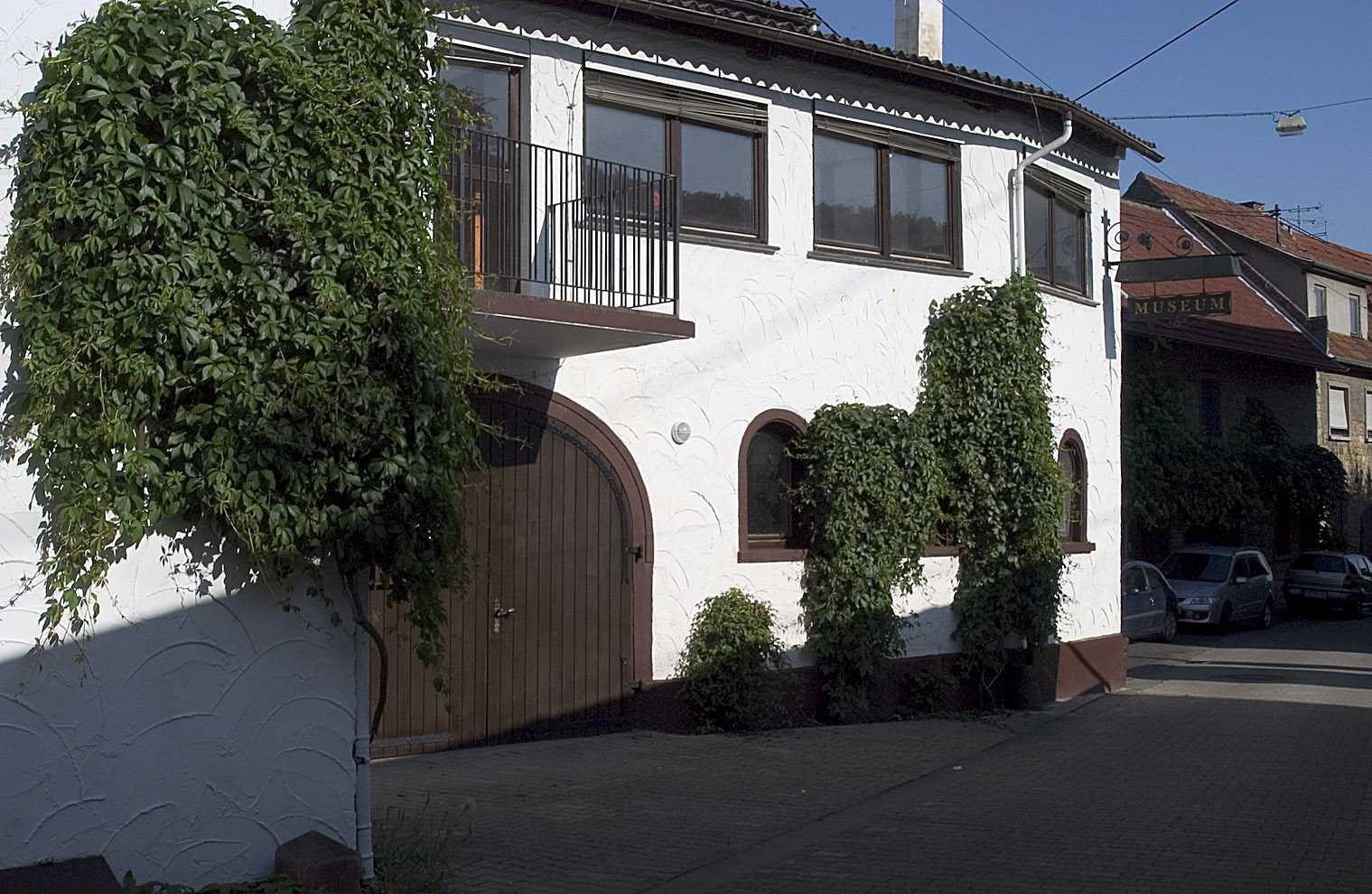
Museum on the Kellerweg

- Kelterhaus (“Wine Press House”, Kellerweg 20) from the 19th century, old building wing built in classical Gründerzeit style with imposing, wood-veneered and painted wine-tasting parlour from that time, last run as a restaurant and passing into municipal ownership in 2000. Since 2003, it has been used as a museum.

=== Buildings ===
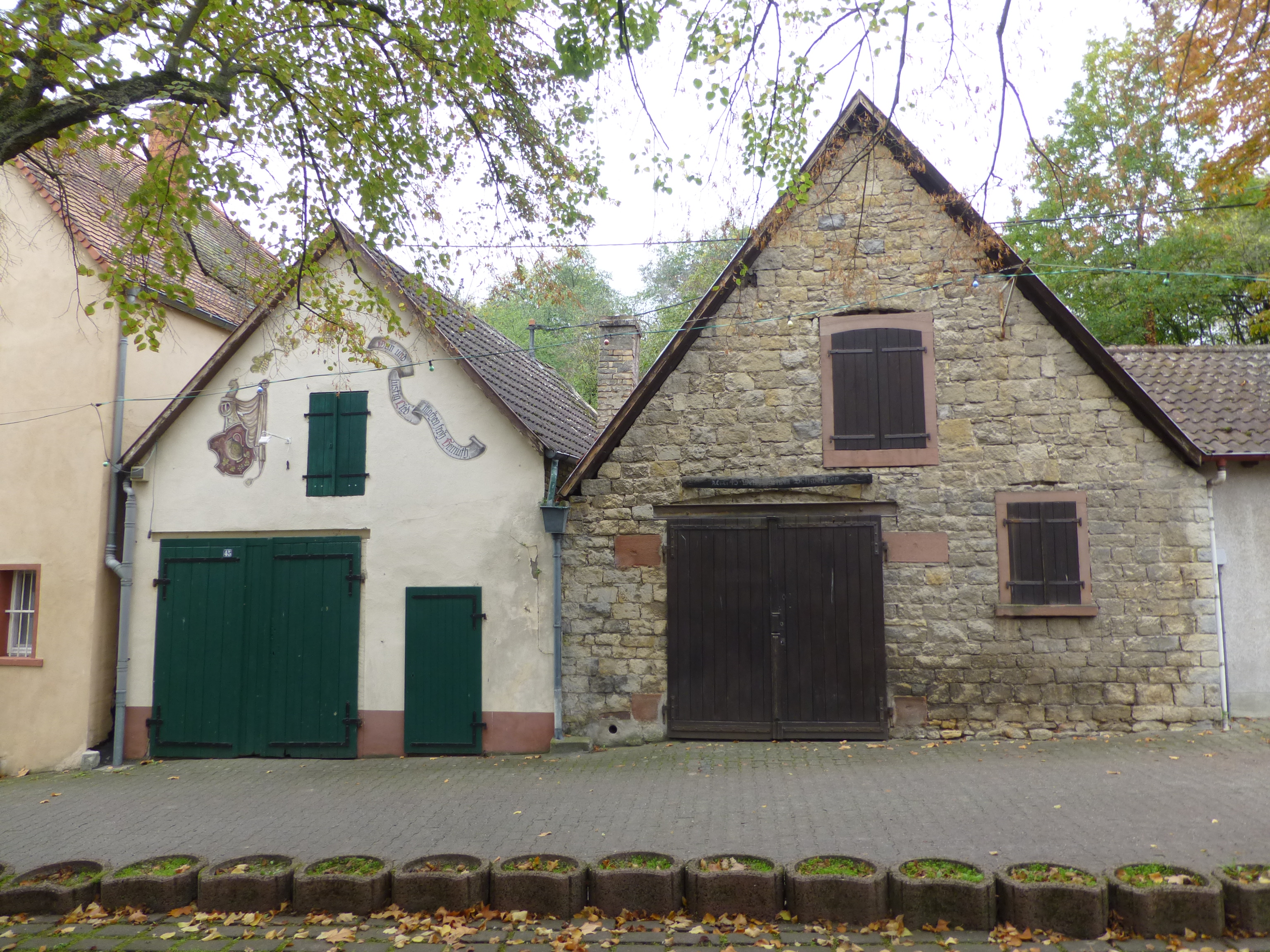
Wine press houses on the Kellerweg

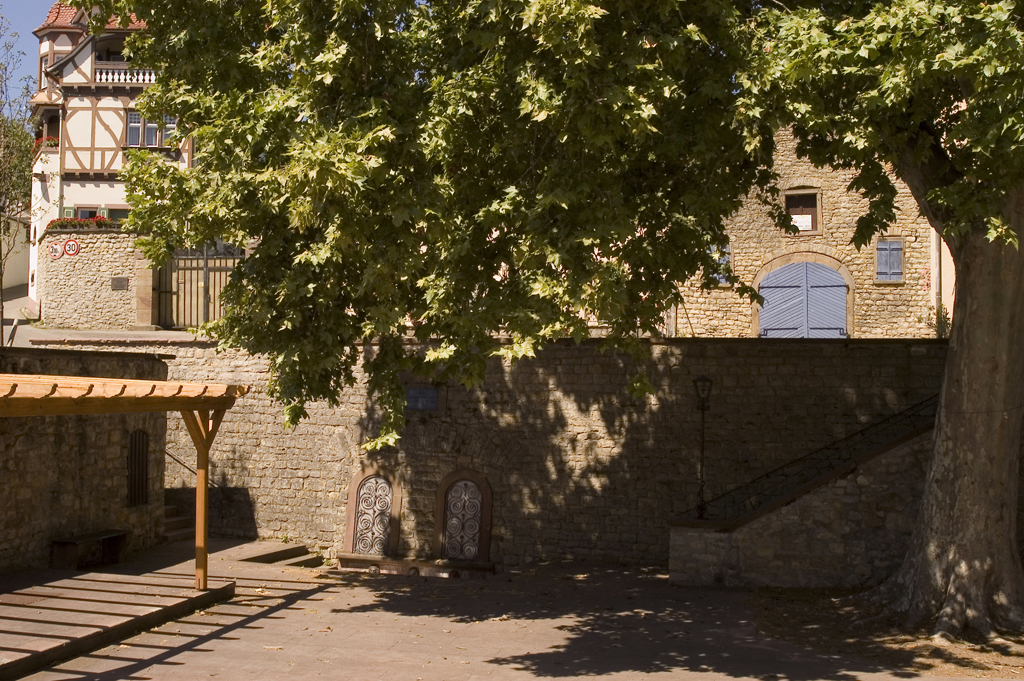
Julianenbrunnen – in the background at left, Prof. Carl Küstner's former summer workshop

- The Kellerweg is a Guntersblum peculiarity. For a kilometre or so along the municipality's raised western edge runs this street where the wine cellars and wine press houses have been set up, safe there from groundwater and flooding from the Rhine. The oldest cellar bears the date 1600. The midpoint on the Kellerweg forms the Julianenbrunnen (spring). Yearly since 1964, the municipality has been celebrating the Kellerweg-Fest on the last two weekends in August. Similar building complexes can also be found in Austria where they are called Kellergasse.
- Waterworks pumphouse

The pumping apparatus with a machine hall and a machinist's house was built in 1906 and 1907 by Wilhelm Lenz, Mainz Grand Ducal Education Inspector. The buildings are in Art Nouveau forms with Baroque elements. The apparatus from that time is partly preserved (Gimbsheimer Straße 52).

=== Parks ===
In the Rhine on the Guntersblum Heights is found the so-called Naherholungsgebiet Insel Kühkopf (“Cow’s Head Island Recreation Area”). The island can be visited by ferry from April to October from Guntersblum Harbour in the municipality's core. The ferry does not carry motorized vehicles, although visitors may take a bicycle.

=== Sport ===
- SV 1921 Guntersblum – With roughly 430 members, SV 1921 Guntersblum is one of the municipality's bigger clubs. The first team plays in the Landesliga (State League). The first team's success under trainer H. Scheffel's leadership is at the fore in the club's work. Rainer Richter is the club's first chairman, backed up in this by Scheffel. The club grounds are found on Alsheimer Straße on the way into the municipality coming from Alsheim.
- Turnverein 1848 e.V. (gymnastic club)
- Tennis club
- Wassersportfreunde – Canoe camping. Right on the Rhine across from the Kühkopf nature conservation area stands the Wassersportfreunde (“Watersport Friends”) boathouse.

=== Regular events ===
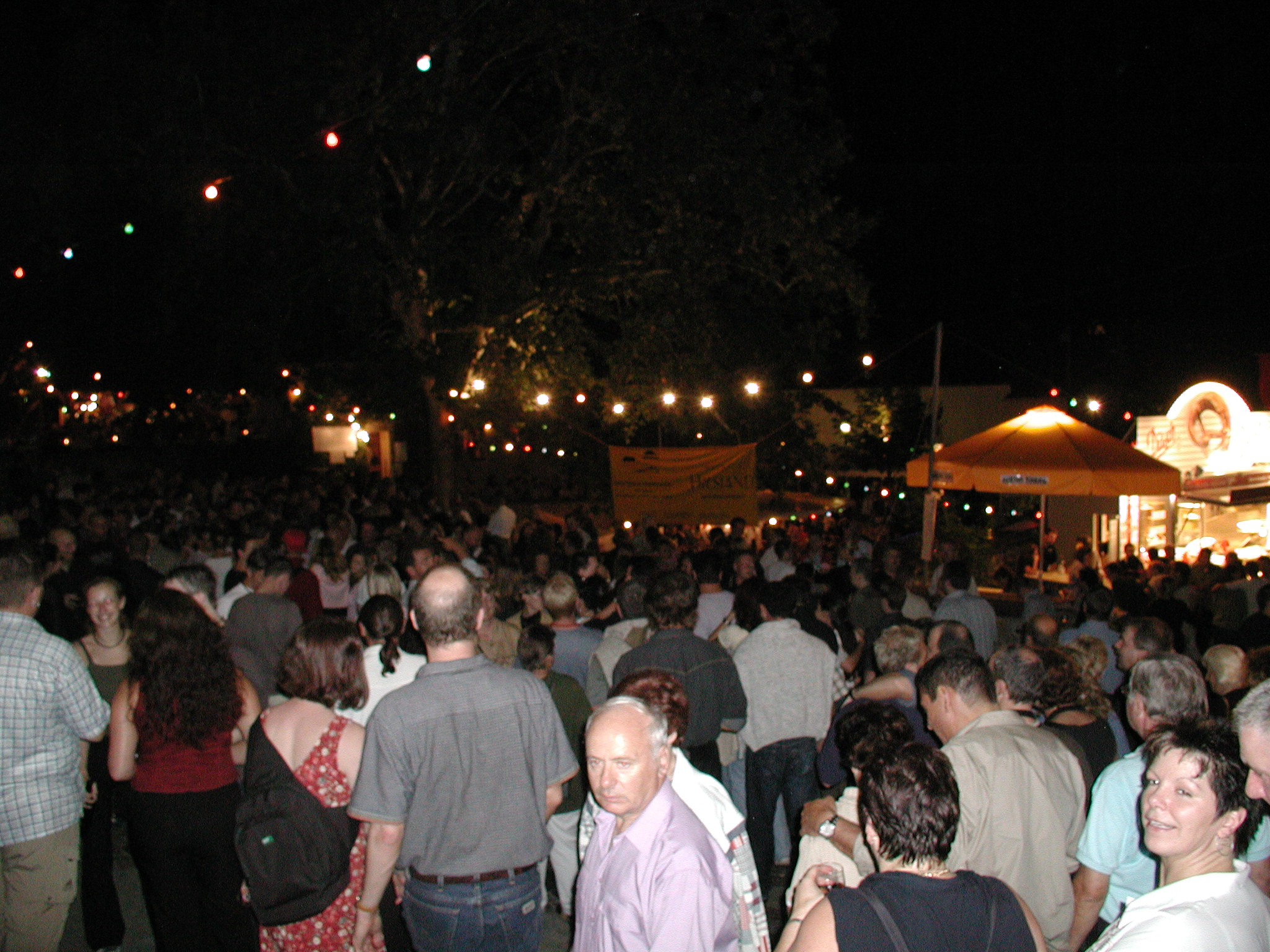
View towards the Julianenbrunnen

Kellerweg-Fest on the last two weekends in August with many visitors from the surrounding area.

== Economy and infrastructure ==
=== Transport ===
Guntersblum lies right on Bundesstraße 9, which runs along from Ludwigshafen am Rhein, parallel to the Mainz–Ludwigshafen railway line to Mainz. Guntersblum lies between two urban agglomerations, the Frankfurt Rhine Main Region and the Rhine Neckar Area.

There are also railway links to these two metropolitan areas with half-hourly trains. In 2015, the RheinNeckar S-Bahn will begin running here. Furthermore, there are highway links to Autobahnen A 61 and A 63 through the Autobahn cross at Alzey, 25 km away. This is only worthwhile for driving towards Koblenz and Kaiserslautern, as Mainz, Worms and Ludwigshafen can be reached more quickly over the B 9.

=== Shopping ===
In Guntersblum are found several bakeries, butcher's shops, hairdressers, supermarkets and discount outlets. Also, many gastronomical businesses are on hand alongside the odd winery.

=== Education ===
The primary school named after the Guntersblumer Carl Küstner is attended by roughly 200 pupils. Within the school's property is also housed the folk high school.

Furthermore, Guntersblum has two kindergartens, Spatzennest and Zwergenpalast (“Sparrow’s Nest” and “Dwarfs’ Palace”).

== Notable people ==
- Augustus Carl Büchel (1813–1864), German-born Confederate officer who died of wounds received at the Battle of Pleasant Hill, Louisiana.
- Henry Dübs, (b. 1816, d. 24 April 1876) German-British engineer and founder of the Dübs & Company locomotive works in Glasgow, Scotland.
- Georg K. Glaser, (1910–1995) German born French writer
- Ferdinand Adolf Kehrer (1837–1914), gynaecologist, inventor of the modern Caesarian section
- Carl Küstner (1861–1934), landscape painter and art professor.
- Johann Philipp Kreißler, ancestor of US automotive pioneer Walter Percy Chrysler, founder of Chrysler), emigrated in 1709
