= Mainz-Bingen =

Coordinates: 49°55′N 8°05′E

- District
- Flag Coat of arms
- Country: Germany
- State: Rhineland-Palatinate
- Capital: Ingelheim

Government
  - District admin.: Thomas Barth (CDU)

Area
  - Total: 605.85 km^{2} (233.92 sq mi)

Population (31 December 2023)
  - Total: 215,286
  - Density: 355.35/km^{2} (920.34/sq mi)
- Time zone: UTC+01:00 (CET)
  - Summer (DST): UTC+02:00 (CEST)
- Vehicle registration: MZ, BIN
- Website: mainz-bingen.de

Mainz-Bingen is a district (Kreis) in the east of Rhineland-Palatinate, Germany. Neighboring districts include Mainz, Alzey-Worms, Bad Kreuznach, and Rhein-Hunsrück in Rhineland-Palatinate and Rheingau-Taunus, Wiesbaden and Groß-Gerau in Hesse.

== History ==
During the French occupation under Napoleon the district was part of the department of Mont-Tonnerre. After the Congress of Vienna, the area north of the Nahe river went to the Prussian Rhine province, the biggest part however became part of the Grand Duchy of Hesse and was called Rhenish Hesse. In 1835 the Mainz district was created when the province Rheinhessen was abolished. In 1852 the Oppenheim district was created, and took some of the area of the Mainz district; in 1938 this district was abolished again. The current area of the district was formed in 1969, when the districts of Mainz and Bingen were merged.

== Geography ==
The main river in the district is the Rhine, which marks the border of the district to the east. In Bingen the river Nahe enters the Rhine, after flowing a short part through the district. The flanks of the Hunsrück mountains in the west of the district to the Rhine valley are used for wine production. The southern part of the district is part of the Rheinhessische Hügellandschaft, its gentle hills and the good climate make it a farming area for vegetables, especially asparagus, and cherries.

== Coat of arms ==
The district coat of arms might be described thus: Per pale gules a wheel spoked of six argent and sable a lion rampant Or armed, langued and crowned of the first, in a chief of the last an eagle displayed of the third armed, langued and beaked of the first. The charges in the coat of arms show the three historic states which influenced the district. In the chief (horizontal band at the top) is the Imperial eagle, on the dexter (armsbearer's right, viewer's left) side the Wheel of Mainz, and on the sinister (armsbearer's left, viewer's right) side the lion of the Electorate of the Palatinate (Kurpfalz). The coat of arms was designed by Dr. Hans Leitermann of Mainz, and was granted in 1970.

== Towns and municipalities ==
Clickable map of towns and municipalities in the district

Verband-free towns
1. Bingen am Rhein
2. Ingelheim am Rhein
Verband-free municipality
1. Budenheim

Verbandsgemeinden
1. Bodenheim; 1. Bodenheim^{1}; 2. Gau-Bischofsheim; 3. Harxheim; 4. Lörzweiler; 5. Nackenheim; 2. Gau-Algesheim; 1. Appenheim; 2. Bubenheim; 3. Engelstadt; 4. Gau-Algesheim^{1, 2}; 5. Nieder-Hilbersheim; 6. Ober-Hilbersheim; 7. Ockenheim; 8. Schwabenheim an der Selz	3. Nieder-Olm; 1. Essenheim; 2. Jugenheim in Rheinhessen; 3. Klein-Winternheim; 4. Nieder-Olm^{1, 2}; 5. Ober-Olm; 6. Sörgenloch; 7. Stadecken-Elsheim; 8. Zornheim; 4. Rhein-Nahe [seat: Bingen am Rhein]; 1. Bacharach^{2}; 2. Breitscheid; 3. Manubach; 4. Münster-Sarmsheim; 5. Niederheimbach; 6. Oberdiebach; 7. Oberheimbach; 8. Trechtingshausen; 9. Waldalgesheim; 10. Weiler bei Bingen	5. Rhein-Selz; 1. Dalheim; 2. Dexheim; 3. Dienheim; 4. Dolgesheim; 5. Dorn-Dürkheim; 6. Eimsheim; 7. Friesenheim; 8. Guntersblum; 9. Hahnheim; 10. Hillesheim; 11. Köngernheim; 12. Ludwigshöhe; 13. Mommenheim; 14. Nierstein; 15. Oppenheim^{1, 2}; 16. Selzen; 17. Uelversheim; 18. Undenheim; 19. Weinolsheim; 20. Wintersheim	6. Sprendlingen-Gensingen; 1. Aspisheim; 2. Badenheim; 3. Gensingen; 4. Grolsheim; 5. Horrweiler; 6. Sankt Johann; 7. Sprendlingen^{1}; 8. Welgesheim; 9. Wolfsheim; 10. Zotzenheim
^{1}seat of the Verbandsgemeinde; ^{2}town

== Festivals and cultural events ==
Beneath the typical regional carnival with parades and seasons in nearly every village or municipality there are a number of wine festivals, like the Bodenheimer Albansfest, the Guntersblumer Kellerwegfest, the Ingelheimer Rotweinfest, the wine presentation on the Roten Hang in Nierstein or the feast of the young wine in Gau-Algesheim.
