= Uelversheim =

- Municipality
- Flag Coat of arms

- Location of Uelversheim within Mainz-Bingen district
- Interactive map of Uelversheim
- Location within Germany Location within Rhineland-Palatinate
- Coordinates: 49°48′36″N 08°17′18″E
- Country: Germany
- State: Rhineland-Palatinate
- District: Mainz-Bingen
- Municipal assoc.: Rhein-Selz

Government
  - Mayor (2024–29): Ernst Braner (SPD)

Area
  - Total: 7.49 km^{2} (2.89 sq mi)
- Elevation: 190 m (620 ft)

Population (2025-12-31)
  - Total: 1,116
  - Density: 149/km^{2} (386/sq mi)
- Time zone: UTC+01:00 (CET)
  - Summer (DST): UTC+02:00 (CEST)
- Postal codes: 55278
- Dialling codes: 06249
- Vehicle registration: MZ
- Website: www.uelversheim.com

Uelversheim is an Ortsgemeinde – a municipality belonging to a Verbandsgemeinde, a kind of collective municipality – in the Mainz-Bingen district in Rhineland-Palatinate, Germany.

== Geography ==
Uelversheim lies between Mainz and Worms, in the “Heart of Rhenish Hesse”, and belongs to the Berggemeinden (“Mountain Municipalities”, besides Uelversheim these are the neighbouring centres of Weinolsheim, Dolgesheim and Eimsheim)

Uelversheim is a typical winegrowing centre, with almost a fourth of its area given over to this pursuit. Wine is also grown in an exclave between Dienheim and Guntersblum, which along with the actual community forms part of Uelversheim's municipal area.

== History ==
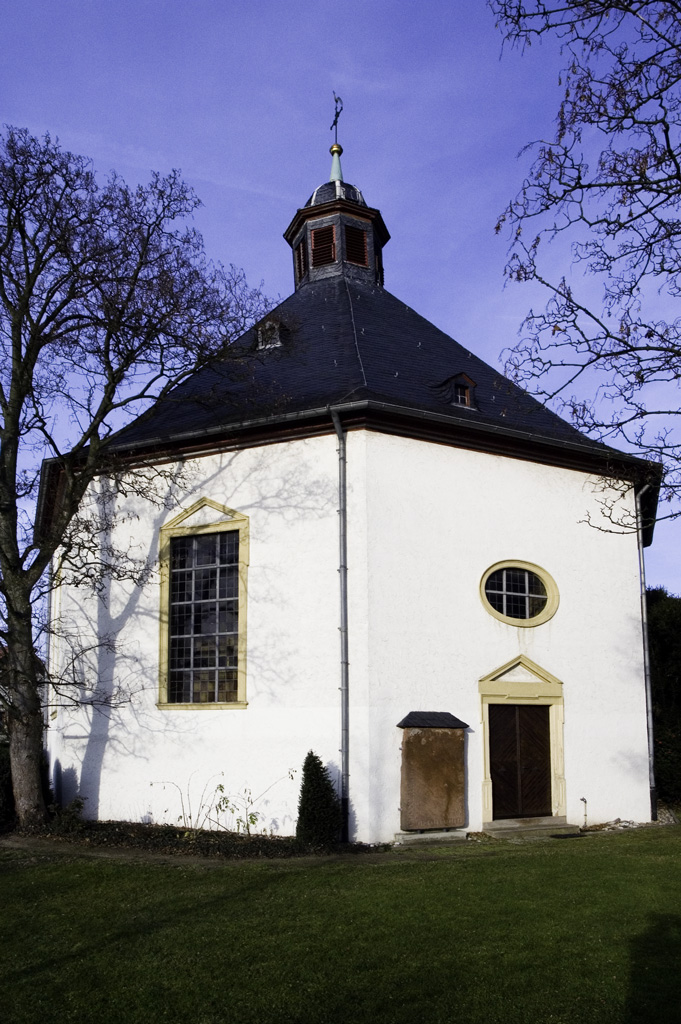
The Evangelical church from the southwest

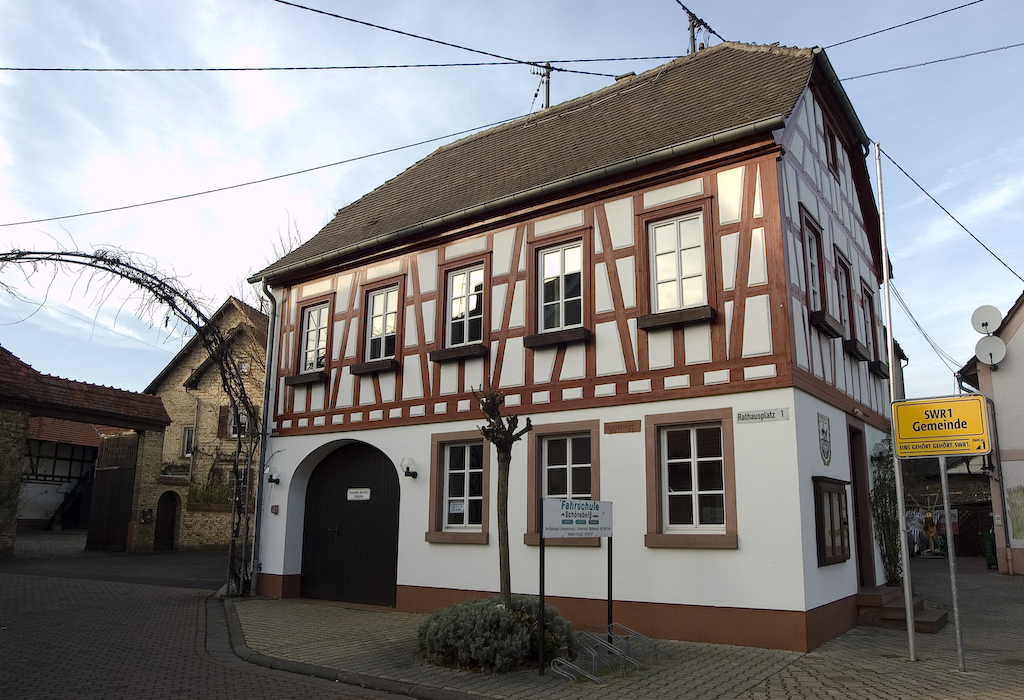
Town Hall

In 766, Uelversheim had its first documentary mention. Digs, however, confirm that the area was earlier substantially settled by Celts and Germanic peoples.

Over lengthy times in the Middle Ages, the place belonged to the Counts of Leiningen who built a castle here as a summer residence.

== Government ==
Uelversheim is part of the Verbandsgemeinde Rhein-Selz.

The Municipal Council is made up of 17 council members, counting the part-time mayor, with seats apportioned thus:

	CDU	SPD	FWG	Total
2004	5	7	4	16 seats

(as of municipal election held on 13 June 2004)

Elections in 2014:

- CDU: 9 seats
- SPD: 7 seats

== Culture and sightseeing ==
=== Buildings ===
The Evangelical church was built in 1722 by a master builder from Freiburg in the unique shape of a regular octagon. It is to this unusual church that the Uelversheim nickname die Merkwerdische can be traced, merkwerdisch being a local variation of the German word merkwürdig – “odd”.

Today's Town Hall is a timber-frame house built in the Baroque style.

=== Regular events ===
The village's well known festivals are Fassenacht with two regularly sold-out “sessions”, the Sport Week held by TSV Uelversheim with the Traditionsjedermannturnier (“Traditional Everyman Tournament”), the kermis (church consecration festival, locally known as the Kerb) with its famous kermis parade and kermis youth, the Keller-Dudde-Fest organized by the men's singing club and the AVT-Hakorennen (race) held every other year.

== Transport ==
The nearest Autobahn interchange is Wörrstadt on the A 63, some 12 km away.
