= Dexheim =

- Municipality
- Coat of arms

- Location of Dexheim within Mainz-Bingen district
- Interactive map of Dexheim
- Location within Germany Location within Rhineland-Palatinate
- Coordinates: 49°50′50″N 8°19′0″E
- Country: Germany
- State: Rhineland-Palatinate
- District: Mainz-Bingen
- Municipal assoc.: Rhein-Selz

Government
  - Mayor (2019–24): Hubert Horn (FW)

Area
  - Total: 5.69 km^{2} (2.20 sq mi)
- Elevation: 201 m (659 ft)

Population (2025-12-31)
  - Total: 1,443
  - Density: 254/km^{2} (657/sq mi)
- Time zone: UTC+01:00 (CET)
  - Summer (DST): UTC+02:00 (CEST)
- Postal codes: 55278
- Dialling codes: 06133
- Vehicle registration: MZ
- Website: www.dexheim.de

Dexheim (German pronunciation: [ˈdɛkshaɪm]) is an Ortsgemeinde – a municipality belonging to a Verbandsgemeinde, a kind of collective municipality – in the Mainz-Bingen district in Rhineland-Palatinate, Germany.

== Geography ==
=== Location ===
Dexheim lies between Mainz and Worms, in Rhenish Hesse. The winemaking centre belongs to the Verbandsgemeinde Rhein-Selz, whose seat is in Oppenheim.

== History ==
Dexheim's history began long before its first documentary mention. Finds within Dexheim's municipal limits have yielded information about the Germani who lived here. These artefacts can be seen at the Roman-Germanic Central Museum (Römisch-Germanisches Zentralmuseum) in Mainz. When the Romans needed bricks to build their castra, they took as their raw material the loam from Dexheim to shape and fire into bricks.

In 774 Dexheim had its first documentary mention in a donation document in which Charlemagne bequeathed a great estate to the Lorsch Abbey. The second documentary mention is contained in an act in which King Arnulf of Carinthia donated the church at Dexheim to the Fulda Abbey.

Dexheim was a Free Imperial Village, paying taxes only to the Emperor. Its coat of arms was a silver cross with the red “Imperial Apple”. With the neighbouring places of Nierstein and Schwabsburg it became the site of the common court. In 1376 it passed to the Oberamt of Oppenheim and remained with it until the Electorate of the Palatinate was no more.

Until then the village had already had many landlords. For lack of money – something similar had already happened earlier – the Emperor had pledged Dexheim in 1315 to the Archbishop of Mainz, redeeming it in 1353.

The Thirty Years' War was frightful for Dexheim. A document from 1647, and thus one year before the Peace of Westphalia, gives an impression. Almost all the houses were destroyed; only the palace of the Lords of Dienheim and a few houses nearby were habitable.

Dexheim's importance is also underscored by the names of noble families that had holdings here. Found here, among others, are names such as:

- Electoral Court Chamber (Kurfürstliche Hofkammer)
- Oppenheim Monastery (Stift Oppenheim)
- Maria Kron Monastery (Kloster Maria Kron), Oppenheim
- Domstift Mainz
- Carthusians
- Lords of Gemmingen
- Lords of Dienheim
- Lords of Frankenstein
- Lords of Schmittburg
- Lords of Geißpisheim

Remnants of the church from the 9th century likely form the lower part of the Evangelical parish church's tower.

This church's first documentary mention comes from the 14th century. From this time also come the Gothic paintings and a mandorla that was revealed during renovation work on the tower.

In 1816 Dexheim passed to the Grand Duchy of Hesse. It belonged to the Mainz district and later, in 1851, it passed to the Oppenheim district. It therefore has much history in common with the neighbouring places of Nierstein, Schwabsburg and Oppenheim.

After World War II the US Army (123rd Main Support Battalion) remained here for many years until Anderson Barracks closed in 2008 and the Institute for Federal Real Estate (Germany) took over responsibility for the site.

== Politics ==
=== Municipal council ===
As of 2024, the council is made up of 16 council members with the mayor as chairman (17 votes), and with seats apportioned thus:

- FW 11 seats, excluding the mayor
- SPD 5 seats

=== Coat of arms ===
The municipality's arms reflect its history as an Imperial village. As such, Dexheim was allowed to bear arms charged with the black Imperial Eagle with red claws and beak on a golden field. Later, when the municipality became an Palatinate holding, it forwent introducing arms showing the Palatine lion in favour of the old Imperial Eagle, which it kept until the end of the 18th century. In the 19th century, however, the Dexheim arms were forgotten.

Only in the mid 20th century was the Imperial Eagle reintroduced into the municipality's arms. However, it was wrongly assumed then that Dexheim had borne a globus cruciger in its arms. The actual historical arms, though, are charged only with the Imperial Eagle.
