= Eimsheim =

- Municipality
- Coat of arms

- Location of Eimsheim within Mainz-Bingen district
- Interactive map of Eimsheim
- Location within Germany Location within Rhineland-Palatinate
- Coordinates: 49°47′44″N 8°17′21″E
- Country: Germany
- State: Rhineland-Palatinate
- District: Mainz-Bingen
- Municipal assoc.: Rhein-Selz

Government
  - Mayor (2019–24): Dirk Hesse

Area
  - Total: 4.61 km^{2} (1.78 sq mi)
- Elevation: 180–220 m (590–720 ft)

Population (2025-12-31)
  - Total: 480
  - Density: 100/km^{2} (270/sq mi)
- Time zone: UTC+01:00 (CET)
  - Summer (DST): UTC+02:00 (CEST)
- Postal codes: 55278
- Dialling codes: 06249
- Vehicle registration: MZ
- Website: www.eimsheim.de

Eimsheim (German pronunciation: [ˈaɪmshaɪm]) is a winegrowing Ortsgemeinde – a municipality belonging to a Verbandsgemeinde, a kind of collective municipality – in the Mainz-Bingen district in Rhineland-Palatinate, Germany.

== Geography ==
=== Location ===
The municipality lies in Rhenish Hesse.

=== Land use ===
The municipality's area is 451 ha, of which some 100 ha is given over to vineyards.

== History ==
Finds unearthed from the Bronze Age suggest that there were settlers in the time between 1800 and 1000 BC. The remains of a column capital from a Jupiter temple have also been found.

About 500, the Franks settled here; the placename Uminisheim goes back to the tribal elder Umin. Eimsheim, at the time belonging to the Wormsgau (a county), had its first documentary mention in 762 in a donation document in which Egilolf transferred a vineyard in the Huminsheimer Marca to the Lorsch Abbey.

In the early 11th century Eimsheim belonged to the Bishopric of Worms, which later ceded it to the “Weidas” Cistercian convent near Dautenheim. In 1485, half of the village was handed over to the Elector Palatine Philipp “the Gallant”, while the other half only passed to the Electorate of the Palatinate in 1551 under Philipp's son Friedrich “the Wise”.

In 1780 the new Catholic church was completed. Shortly thereafter, Eimsheim fell under French administration. Eimsheim citizens, too, fought in the Napoleonic Wars. As a memorial to this time, the so-called Napoleonstein was put up at the old graveyard in 1852 in memory of the veterans.

In a phase of great building activity between 1890 and 1906 arose, among other things, the Old School, the New School, the Town Hall and the Evangelical church. The population had reached some 600 by this time.

In 1982, Eimsheim won first prize in the contest Unser Dorf soll schöner werden (“Our Village Should Be Lovelier”).

=== Religion ===
There are two churches, St. Pirmin for the Catholic community and Christ the Redeemer for the Evangelical community.

== Politics ==
=== Ortsbürgermeister ===
The Ortsbürgermeister – Mayor of the Ortsgemeinde – is Dirk Hesse, elected by the municipal council in August 2019.

=== Coat of arms ===
The municipality's arms might be described thus: Per fess sable a demi-lion rampant Or armed, langued and crowned gules, and azure from base issuant a spring basin of the second masoned of the first from which a stream of water argent surmounting a crozier of the second bendwise sinister.

Eimsheim belonged from 1565 until Napoleonic times to the Electorate of the Palatinate, explaining the Palatine Lion in the upper part of the escutcheon. The Catholic Church is consecrated to Saint Pirmin, who therefore appeared in a court seal known from 1546. Another court seal with the same composition comes from 1769. In both seals, the saint's full figure is shown, and he is clothed as a bishop with a mitre and a crozier. Beside the saint is a small spring basin on the ground with a stream of water coming forth from it. This motif recalls that Saint Pirmin, according to legend, made a spring come forth with a blow from his bishop's crozier. The spring's water was said to have healed eye complaints and rheumatic illnesses. The spring itself water was said to have been on Reichenau Island in Lake Constance, where Pirmin founded his well-known monastery – and indeed where he got rid of all the venomous snakes. The saint, who died in Hornbach near Zweibrücken – his last place of work – was one of Southwest Germany's most important missionaries. In the Middle Rhine area he seldom appears as a church's patron saint, and that he is such a thing for a church in Eimsheim can be explained by the municipality's former allegiance to the Palatinate, where his name often cropped up. Furthermore, to this day, springs can still be found in Eimsheim giving forth water from slopes, and they are also to be seen on many farms. As late as 1906, the municipality got its water supply from ten municipally owned springs.

== Economy and infrastructure ==
- Vereinigte Weingüter Krebs-Grode (“Krebs-Grode United Wineries”)
