= Dienheim =

- Municipality
- Coat of arms

- Location of Dienheim within Mainz-Bingen district
- Interactive map of Dienheim
- Location within Germany Location within Rhineland-Palatinate
- Coordinates: 49°50′25″N 8°21′2″E
- Country: Germany
- State: Rhineland-Palatinate
- District: Mainz-Bingen
- Municipal assoc.: Rhein-Selz

Government
  - Mayor (2019–24): Barbara Krenzer

Area
  - Total: 9.91 km^{2} (3.83 sq mi)
- Elevation: 90–120 m (300–390 ft)

Population (2025-12-31)
  - Total: 2,211
  - Density: 223/km^{2} (578/sq mi)
- Time zone: UTC+01:00 (CET)
  - Summer (DST): UTC+02:00 (CEST)
- Postal codes: 55276
- Dialling codes: 06133
- Vehicle registration: MZ
- Website: www.dienheim.de

Dienheim (German pronunciation: [ˈdiːnhaɪm]) is an Ortsgemeinde – a municipality belonging to a Verbandsgemeinde, a kind of collective municipality – in the Mainz-Bingen district in Rhineland-Palatinate, Germany.

== Geography ==
=== Location ===
Dienheim lies between Mainz and Worms, in Rhenish Hesse. The winemaking centre belongs to the Verbandsgemeinde Rhein-Selz, whose seat is in Oppenheim.

== History ==
In the 8th century, Dienheim had its first documentary mention. The village passed in Charlemagne’s time to the Fulda Abbey. Later it ended up as an Imperial pledge in Electoral Palatinate’s ownership.

Dienheim is mentioned in the Wormser wall-building ordinance from around 900 as one of the places that shared responsibility for maintaining the city wall of Worms.

From the early 13th century, the Barons of Dienheim are witnessed, later, from the 16th to 18th century, being assigned to the Rhenish Knightly District’s (Rheinischer Ritterkreis) canton of Oberrheinstrom.

== Politics ==
=== Town council ===
The council is made up of 17 council members, counting the part-time mayor, with seats apportioned thus:

	SPD	CDU	FWG	Total
2004	5	4	7	16 seats

(as at municipal election held on 13 June 2004)

=== Coat of arms ===
The municipality's arms might be described thus: Per pale sable and argent a lion rampant Or armed gules and a cross of the first.

=== Town partnerships ===
- Sours, Eure-et-Loir, France since 1977

== Economy and infrastructure ==
=== Transport ===
==== Highways ====
The municipality lies on Bundesstraße 9 linking Mainz with Worms. Since December 2007, the B 9, which had until then run through the built-up area, has run instead along a bypass alongside the railway line.

The Autobahnen A 60 and A 63 can each be reached in roughly 20 minutes.

==== Local public transport ====
Once the Mainz-Ludwigshafen railway line is integrated into the RheinNeckar S-Bahn in 2015, there will be a stop somewhere near the sporting ground.
