= Wiesbach (Nahe) =

River in Germany

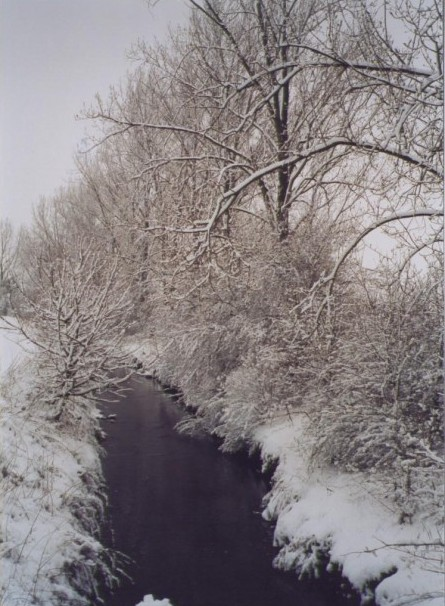
- The Wiesbach near Welgesheim in winter

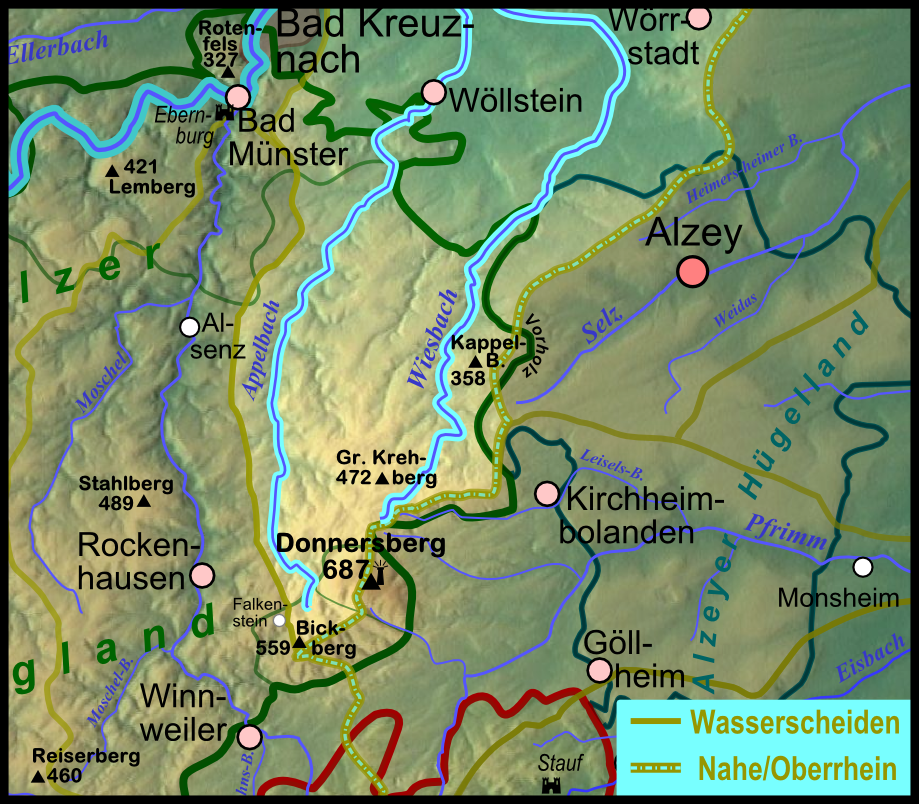
- Map of the catchment area (excluding the mouth) of the two parallel Donnersberg streams: the Wiesbach (right) and Appelbach (left)

Location
- Country: Germany
- State: Rhineland-Palatinate
- Reference no.: DE: 25498

Physical characteristics
- Source
  - location: North Palatine Uplands
  - coordinates: 49°38′54.43″N 7°55′25.67″E
  - elevation: ca. 445 m above sea level (NHN)
- Mouth
  - location: At Grolsheim
  - coordinates: 49°54′13.01″N 7°54′46.74″E
  - elevation: ca. 92 m above sea level (NHN)
- Length: 44.4 km (27.6 mi)
- Basin size: 201.534 km^{2} (77.813 sq mi)

Basin features
- Progression: Nahe→ Rhine→ North Sea

The Wiesbach (German pronunciation: [ˈviːsbax]) is a 44.4-kilometre-long (27.6 mi) river of Rhineland-Palatinate, Germany.

The Wiesbach rises in the North Palatine Uplands and flows into the Nahe near Grolsheim in the county of Mainz-Bingen. It is a 2nd order stream managed by the Wiesbachverband, which operates in the counties of Alzey-Worms and Mainz-Bingen. Together with the Selz and the Appelbach it is one of the most important rivers of Rhenish Hesse.

== Geography and geology ==
The Wiesbach, along with the Appelbach, drains the northwestern area of Rhenish Hesse. Its source region lies in the North Palatine Uplands, the northern outliers of the precipitation-rich Donnersberg massif, west of Haide in the borough of Kirchheimbolanden. In the first third of its course the streambed cuts into magmatic rocks and sediments of the Rotliegendes era (285 - 255 MYA). As a result, it forms a system of relatively narrow valleys.

Roughly from Nieder-Wiesen to Flonheim it flows through the charming landscape of Rhenish-Hessian Switzerland. Here, apart from the valley meadows, mixed forest predominates on the poor soils. Oberwiesen calls itself a 'forest municipality' (Waldgemeinde). For a long time in this region, the mining of Mercury and quarrying of building stone (especially Flonheim Sandstone) was important. Today, in the source region of the stream (Winkelbach), magmatite is mined in the huge quarries on the Donnersberg and turned into ballast material. The subsequent course of the Wiesbach through the Tertiary deposits of the Rhenish-Hessian Hills flows through a broad valley with gently sloping hillsides. This country with its fertile löss soils is characterised by wine growing and arable farming. After about 48 kilometres (30 mi), the Wiesbach reaches the Nahe near Grolsheim.

== Course ==
The Wiesbach originates in the vicinity of Rothenkircherhof (above Oberwiesen) from the Winkelbach and the streams around an old poultry farm. It empties into the a side arm of the Nahe near the Rumpf Mill. This side branch joins the main river just before Grolsheim. The stream flows through Oberwiesen, Nieder-Wiesen and Wendelsheim, passing there the Teufelsrutsch ("Devil’s Slide") and unites with the Finkenbach. It subsequently flows through Uffhofen (a district of Flonheim), Flonheim, Armsheim, Schimsheim (a district of Armsheim) and Wallertheim, on the eastern edge of which it is joined by the Sulzheimer Bach. The Wiesbach then passes, near Gau-Bickelheim, the Wißberg, where it picks up the Johannsbach (coming from the Wißberg from the direction of Sankt Johann). It now turns northwest, flows initially through Sprendlingen, then past Welgesheim, Zotzenheim and Gensingen. The stream is accompanied by the railway from Armsheim-Wendelsheim (Wiesbach Valley Railway) between Wendelsheim and Armsheimand by the line from Worms to Bingen (Rhenish Hesse Railway) between Armsheim and Gensingen-Horrweiler.

== Tributaries ==
- Steindellerbach (left)
- Schanzengraben (right)
- Goßenbach (left)
- Ambach (right), 2.5 km
- Bach aus den Molkenwiesen (right), 2.6 km
- Kernbach (left), 3.9 km
- Nebelborn (left), 1.5 km
- Wörlebach (right), 1.9 km
- Bach vom Spitzenberg (left), 1.2 km
- Oberwiesenbach (left), 4.6 km
- Schniftenbergerbach (left)
- Teufelsborn (Teufelswiesenbach) (right), 2.7 km
- Dembach (right), 2.1 km
- Dornbach (right)
- Grubenbach (left)
- Nackbach (right)
- Finkenbach (left), 7.4 km
- Moosbach (right), 3.2 km
- Aulheimer Graben (right), 1.8 km
- Bornheimerbach (right), 1.6 km
- Mörschgraben (right), 5.0 km
- Bernhardsgraben (right)
- Wallertheimergraben (right)
- Sulzheimer Bach (right), 4.5 km
- Gau-Weinheimerbach (right), 2.2 km
- Johannsbach (right), 5.9 km
- Höllengraben (right), 1.9 km
- Bach von of the Sonnhöll (right), 1.5 km
- Horrweiler Graben (right), 4.7 km

== See also ==
- List of rivers of Rhineland-Palatinate
