= Pfaffen-Schwabenheim =

- Municipality
- Coat of arms

- Location of Pfaffen-Schwabenheim within Bad Kreuznach district
- Interactive map of Pfaffen-Schwabenheim
- Location within Germany Location within Rhineland-Palatinate
- Coordinates: 49°51′06″N 07°57′10″E
- Country: Germany
- State: Rhineland-Palatinate
- District: Bad Kreuznach
- Municipal assoc.: Bad Kreuznach

Government
  - Mayor (2024–29): Hans-Peter Haas (CDU)

Area
  - Total: 5.18 km^{2} (2.00 sq mi)
- Elevation: 144 m (472 ft)

Population (2025-12-31)
  - Total: 1,570
  - Density: 303/km^{2} (785/sq mi)
- Time zone: UTC+01:00 (CET)
  - Summer (DST): UTC+02:00 (CEST)
- Postal codes: 55546
- Dialling codes: 06701
- Vehicle registration: KH
- Website: pfaffen-schwabenheim.de

Pfaffen-Schwabenheim is an Ortsgemeinde – a municipality belonging to a Verbandsgemeinde, a kind of collective municipality – in the Bad Kreuznach district in Rhineland-Palatinate, Germany. It belongs to the Verbandsgemeinde of Bad Kreuznach, whose seat is in the like-named town, although this lies outside the Verbandsgemeinde. Pfaffen-Schwabenheim is a winegrowing village.

== Geography ==
=== Location ===
Pfaffen-Schwabenheim lies on the Appelbach in the district's easternmost corner, just east of the district seat of Bad Kreuznach (and thus east of the Nahe) and 14 km directly south of the Rhine at Bingen's outlying centre of Kempten.

=== Neighbouring municipalities ===
Clockwise from the north, Pfaffen-Schwabenheim's neighbours are the municipalities of Biebelsheim, Zotzenheim, Sprendlingen, Badenheim, Pleitersheim and Volxheim and the town of Bad Kreuznach. Zotzenheim, Sprendlingen and Badenheim all lie in the neighbouring Mainz-Bingen district, whereas all the others likewise lie within the Bad Kreuznach district.

=== Constituent communities ===
Also belonging to Pfaffen-Schwabenheim is the outlying homestead of Schleifmühle.

== History ==
During some clearing work not very many years ago, workers happened upon some roof tiles and ceramic shards. Dr. Rupprecht from the directorate of the Kulturelles Erbe (“Cultural Heritage”) in Mainz, recognized at first glance the typical piece scored with a metal comb, a technique employed to give opus caementicium a stronger grip. The shards, too, could quickly be classified as roofing from a Roman villa rustica. It is believed that there is much more in the way of remnants hidden in the earth, and there is to be a dig at the villa someday. In many writings about Pfaffen-Schwabenheim, the year 765 is given as the date of the village's first documentary mention. Invoked here is a document issued by Count Cancro as endower of a vineyard for Lorsch Abbey. The municipality also used it to justify holding their 1,200th anniversary in 1965. Whether this vineyard actually lay within Pfaffen-Schwabenheim's limits, though, is by no means certain. The document in question only names a place called Suaboheim im Wormsgau, which could just as easily mean Schwabenheim an der Selz. There being two places with the same name in the same region, it is of course impossible to make a clear determination in favour of either place, even though the name crops up in four further donation documents from the abbey from the 8th century. Because there were so many donations in the neighbouring municipalities to the abbey in the same time period, and because Suaboheim was mentioned in documents so many times, it is at least likely, though, that one document or another actually refers to Pfaffen-Schwabenheim. However, the first certain mention came in 1130. Archbishop Adalbert of Mainz (d. 1137) then documented that Count Meginhard of Sponheim “in villa que vocatur Suaboheim” (“in the village that is called Schwabenheim”) had transferred the abbey to Archiepiscopal ownership for it to be occupied by Augustinian canons. The abbey itself had been founded about 1040, with Eberhard VI of Nellenburg as one of its cofounders. It is from this document that something first comes to light about the abbey with whose fate the village's is so tightly bound. Among other things, the village has the abbey to thank for the inclusion of the element “Pfaffen-” in its name (Pfaffe is an old German word for “priest”, nowadays considered somewhat derogatory; it thus roughly corresponds with the English “parson”; the form with the —n suffix is genitive, making the name's meaning “Parson’s Schwabenheim”). The “Pfaffen-” tag first cropped up in a 1248 document, and it has served to distinguish Pfaffen-Schwabenheim from the otherwise like-named village on the River Selz, already mentioned above. The reason for this choice of a tag, of course, was the Augustinian canons themselves. The name “Schwabenheim” itself might go back to Alemannic settlers. This tribe's original homeland was Swabia (called Schwaben in German), but they eventually spread to what is now Rhenish Hesse. It is possible, if not altogether likely, that the composition of the name is typical of that seen in Frankish villages’ names. According to that point of view, the name could be interpreted as “Suabo’s Home”. Whatever might actually be so, there is no doubt that the decisive impetus for founding the village can be traced to the Frankish taking of the land. Even today, the church with the adjoining mighty convent buildings characterizes Pfaffen-Schwabenheim's appearance. The buildings that stand now, however, date only from the abbey's last phase in the mid 18th century. Only the church's chancel, which as an Early Gothic work is of interest to architectural historians, is older. It cannot be reliably determined when building work on this quire began, but it is highly likely that this happened in the earlier half of the 13th century. The abbey and its monks strongly characterized the village's past. The Pfaffen-Schwabenheim villagers were wholly subject to the provost: they had to do unfree labour, such as working three days to bring in the fruit and vegetable harvest for the lord or helping with the vineyard harvest for one day, among other services that were required. The greater part of Pfaffen-Schwabenheim's municipal area belonged to the abbey, although right from the beginning, there must have been others with landholds here, for according to the Pfaffen-Schwabenheim Weistum (cognate with English wisdom, this was a legal pronouncement issued by men learned in law in the Middle Ages and early modern times), a self-administering municipality existed alongside the provost's estate. About 1120, the village passed as a dowry for the Nellenburg heiress Mechtild of Mörsberg to the County of Sponheim. After the Sponheims split their county into two entities in 1220, Pfaffen-Schwabenheim became part of the County of Sponheim-Kreuznach, which – at least because when viewed from Mainz it seemed this way – was also known as the “Further” County of Sponheim. From the time when the abbey was transferred to Archiepiscopal ownership in 1130, the abbey Vogtei was held by the Counts of Sponheim. After the Sponheim-Kreuznach line of counts died out in 1414, Pfaffen-Schwabenheim passed to the Counts of Sponheim-Starkenburg. When that line then died out only 23 years later in 1437, their joint successors were Electoral Palatinate, the Margraviate of Baden and the Counts of Veldenz-Zweibrücken. This last lordship succeeded in 1444 upon the last count's death to the House of Palatinate-Simmern, who also inherited the rank of Elector in 1559 and eventually died out in 1685. The monastery experienced an upswing in the 15th and 16th centuries. The abbey's heyday in the time when it was subject to the Congregation of Windesheim (named after a place of that name near Zwolle in the Netherlands where this branch of the Augustinians established its first monastery) lasted almost one hundred years and ended with the 16th century's religious wars. In 1566, the Sponheims’ heirs decided to forsake the monastery. After the devastating Nine Years' War (known in Germany as the Pfälzischer Erbfolgekrieg, or War of the Palatine Succession) ended in 1697, the new Electoral line of Palatinate-Neuburg, in the course of its policy of Recatholicization, had a Baroque monastery complex built in Pfaffen-Schwabenheim, which is today the biggest such complex that has been preserved unaltered in Rhineland-Palatinate. This same year, the Augustinian canons under Prior Ignaz Antonius Martels came back to the abbey. Under the prior's leadership, the monastery experienced another upswing. After the partition of the condominium between Baden and Electoral Palatinate in 1707, Pfaffen-Schwabenheim belonged wholly, as part of the Oberamt of Kreuznach, to the latter of those states. The incorporation of the village into the French state in 1797/1798 put an end to centuries-old ruling structures. Pfaffen-Schwabenheim found itself in the Department of Mont-Tonnerre (or Donnersberg in German). In the course of Secularization, the abbey was dissolved in 1802. The abbey's wealth of holdings was declared “national property” by the French and was auctioned off. Pfaffen-Schwabenheim was then a small place. In 1815, at the time of the Congress of Vienna, the village had 404 inhabitants. In the course of general development, the figure had risen to almost one and a half times that by 1846, to 601; by 1905 there were 660 inhabitants. In 1870, several villagers from Pfaffen-Schwabenheim took part in the campaign against France (in the Franco-Prussian War), and one did not come back. The fallen soldiers’ names can be found on a plaque at the warriors’ memorial in the village centre. Modernity began to arrive in Pfaffen-Schwabenheim with the onset of the 20th century. In 1903, the water supply was ensured with the laying of a watermain, and in 1912, electricity came to Pfaffen-Schwabenheim. Not long thereafter, Pfaffen-Schwabenheim was linked to the Bad Kreuznach tramway, which ran from the spa town by way of Bosenheim (now amalgamated with Bad Kreuznach) to Pfaffen-Schwabenheim, and thence onwards to Sprendlingen and Sankt Johann. Service ended in 1952. The warriors’ memorial at the municipal graveyard memorializes the fallen from both world wars. Twenty-two soldiers from Pfaffen-Schwabenheim fell in the First World War, while 53 fell in the Second World War. On 17 March 1945, the Americans were advancing on the village, laying down artillery fire while fighter pilots bombed it. Some houses sustained damage, and two villagers were killed. In the 1960s and 1970s, Pfaffen-Schwabenheim, along with other municipalities near the district seat, profited from its real estate potential, which drew many people from nearby Bad Kreuznach to the village who built houses and settled. Beginning in 1955, when 774 people lived in Pfaffen-Schwabenheim, the municipality was able to increase its population steadily. In the early 1980s, it had reached 915, and by 2011 this had risen to 1,350. In the course of administrative restructuring in Rhineland-Palatinate, Pfaffen-Schwabenheim was grouped along with eight other municipalities into the Verbandsgemeinde of Bad Kreuznach.

=== Augustinian Canonical Foundation’s history ===
The monastic foundation was founded about 1040 by Blessed Eberhard VI of Nellenburg and his mother Hedwig. About 1124, it passed as a dowry for the Nellenburg heiress Hedwig von Mörsberg to the County of Sponheim. In 1130 it was transferred under the terms of the Concordat of Worms to the Archbishop of Mainz, who had it occupied by Augustinian canons. The Schirmvogtei (roughly “protectorate”) was exercised by the line of the Counts of Sponheim who owned Castle Dill at Dill, a village in the Hunsrück. In 1468, the monastery was joined with the Congregation of Windesheim (named after a place of that name near Zwolle in the Netherlands where this branch of the Augustinians established its first monastery). In the course of the Reformation, the abbey was dissolved in 1566, but it was revived in 1697 in the course of Palatinate-Neuburg’s Recatholicization policy and occupied by Augustinian canons from Klausen. Beginning in 1699 under Provost Anton Ignaz von Martels (b. 1669 at Schloss Dankern in Haren; d. 1740 in Pfaffen-Schwabenheim), all the monastery’s former real estate was let to the Electoral Palatinate ecclesiastical landhold administration, and a lively flurry of building activity ensued. The Augustinian canons also provided pastoral care to the neighbouring villages of Badenheim, Ober-Hilbersheim, Sprendlingen, Welgesheim and Zotzenheim. In 1802, the monastery was dissolved in the course of Secularization under Napoleon. At the same time, the pilgrimage to Mary Queen of Peace, which had begun in the mid 18th century, came to an end. In 1808, in the second round of reorganization of the Roman Catholic Diocese of Mainz after the Reichsdeputationshauptschluss, the church passed as a chapel of ease to the parish of Badenheim. With the bull of circumscription, Provida solersque, of 16 August 1821, Pope Pius VII ordered the permanent dissolution of the monastery. Indeed, by 1811, a seniors’ home for retired priests had already been set up in what had been the provostry buildings, and this lasted until 1826. In 1832, the monastery, having by now long stood empty, was, with the exception of the church and the north wing, sold to the municipality, which established a school in the east end of the south wing. In 1833, the whole east and west wings as well as the remaining parts of the south wing were sold again, this time to private owners. In 1972, the pilgrimage to Mary Queen of Peace was revived. Beginning in 1980, the provostry buildings were restored by their private owners. In 2001, there was an extensive restoration to the Baroque part of the monastery church, while in 2013 and 2014, extensive conservational measures were being undertaken on the façade of the Late Romanesque east quire, as were wood preservation measures on the wooden Baroque furnishings.

==== Further reading about the Augustinian Canonical Foundation ====
All the following works are in German:

- Paul-Georg Custodis: Pfaffen-Schwabenheim. Rheinische Kunststätten 501. Rheinischer Verein für Denkmalpflege und Landschaftsschutz, Cologne 2008. ISBN 978-3-86526-019-2.
- Georg Dehio: Handbuch der deutschen Kunstdenkmäler, Rheinland-Pfalz und Saarland, München 1982, pp. 816–818
- Clemens Jöckle: Pfaffen-Schwabenheim. Kleine Kunstführer Nr. 1355. Verlag Schnell und Steiner, München/Zürich 1982

== Religion ==
As at 30 November 2013, there are 1,292 full-time residents in Pfaffen-Schwabenheim, and of those, 559 are Evangelical (43.266%), 423 are Catholic (32.74%), 3 are Greek Orthodox (0.232%), 1 is Lutheran (0.077%), 30 (2.322%) belong to other religious groups and 276 (21.362%) either have no religion or will not reveal their religious affiliation.

== Politics ==
=== Municipal council ===
The council is made up of 16 council members, who were elected by proportional representation at the municipal election held on 7 June 2009, and the honorary mayor as chairman. The municipal election held on 7 June 2009 yielded the following results:

Year	SPD	CDU	FWG	Total
2009	5	7	4	16 seats
2004	4	7	5	16 seats

=== Mayor ===
Pfaffen-Schwabenheim's mayor is Hans-Peter Haas (CDU), and his deputies are Michael Simon (SPD), Jörg Zöller (FWG) and Josef Feldhaus (CDU).

=== Coat of arms ===
The German blazon reads: Das Wappen ist geteilt. In der oberen Hälfte in Silber die Halbfigur eines Augustiner-Mönches in Vorderansicht, beiderseitig begleitet von einem grünen Weinstock. Die untere Hälfte ist in Blau und Gold geschachtet.

The municipality's arms might in English heraldic language be described thus: Per fess argent issuant from the line of partition an Augustinian friar affronty between two grapevines likewise issuant vert, and chequy azure and Or.

The German blazon does not mention the trellises on which the grapevines grow, nor the book that the friar is holding. Indeed, the coat of arms shown at Pfaffen-Schwabenheim's own website shows both in different tinctures to what is seen in this article (the trellises are brown instead of green, and the book is red instead of silver), while the grapevines themselves have leaves. The friar is also shown there with a beard.

The civic arms in this form created by the artist were approved by the Rhineland-Palatinate Ministry of the Interior by a document issued on 10 June 1953. Pfaffen-Schwabenheim belonged in the Middle Ages to the “Further” County of Sponheim, and passed upon its ruling house's extinction in 1473 to joint Electoral Palatinate and Badish rule. From 1707 until the late 18th century, the former was the only overlord. The blue and gold “chequy” pattern in the lower field was passed down with the mark “P–S” (for “Pfaffen-Schwabenheim”) by a court seal from the 17th century (some original stamps from the seal are at the Darmstadt State Archive, while some gypsum stamps can be found at the Mainz State Archive). The upper field is a modern creation, and is canting (see the explanation of the name element “Pfaffen-” under History, above). The whole symbolizes the most important forces that defined the village's history: the Counts of Sponheim and the Augustinian friars, who through their local monastic foundation became indigenous fosterers of culture and at the same time the main promoters of the village's ancient art of winegrowing. The tinctures of the Sponheim arms are confirmed (and indeed are well known). The tinctures that appear in the upper field follow established heraldic norms. The Augustinians wore black habits.

=== Town partnerships ===
Pfaffen-Schwabenheim fosters partnerships with the following places:

- (Germany) Spören, Anhalt-Bitterfeld, Saxony-Anhalt since 1991

Spören, together with its outlying centre of Prussendorf, is a Stadtteil of the town of Zörbig. This came about on 1 March 2004 when Spören was amalgamated along with Löberitz, Göttnitz, Salzfurtkapelle, Schrenz and Stumsdorf into Zörbig. The original partnership had been forged with the then self-administering municipality of Spören.

== Culture and sightseeing ==
=== Buildings ===
The following are listed buildings or sites in Rhineland-Palatinate’s Directory of Cultural Monuments:

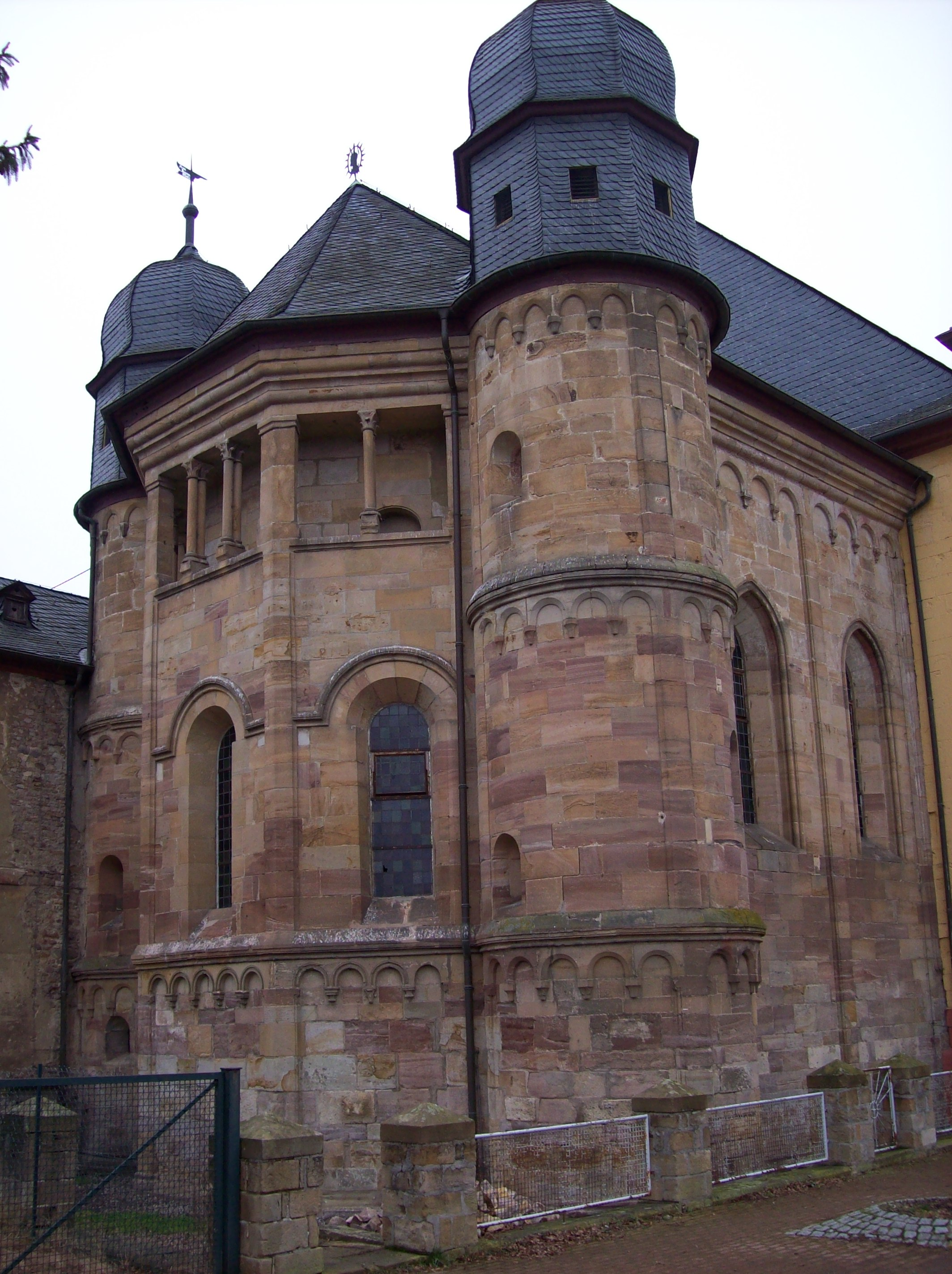
Former Augustinian Canonical Foundation (monumental zone) – Catholic Parish Church of the Assumption of Mary

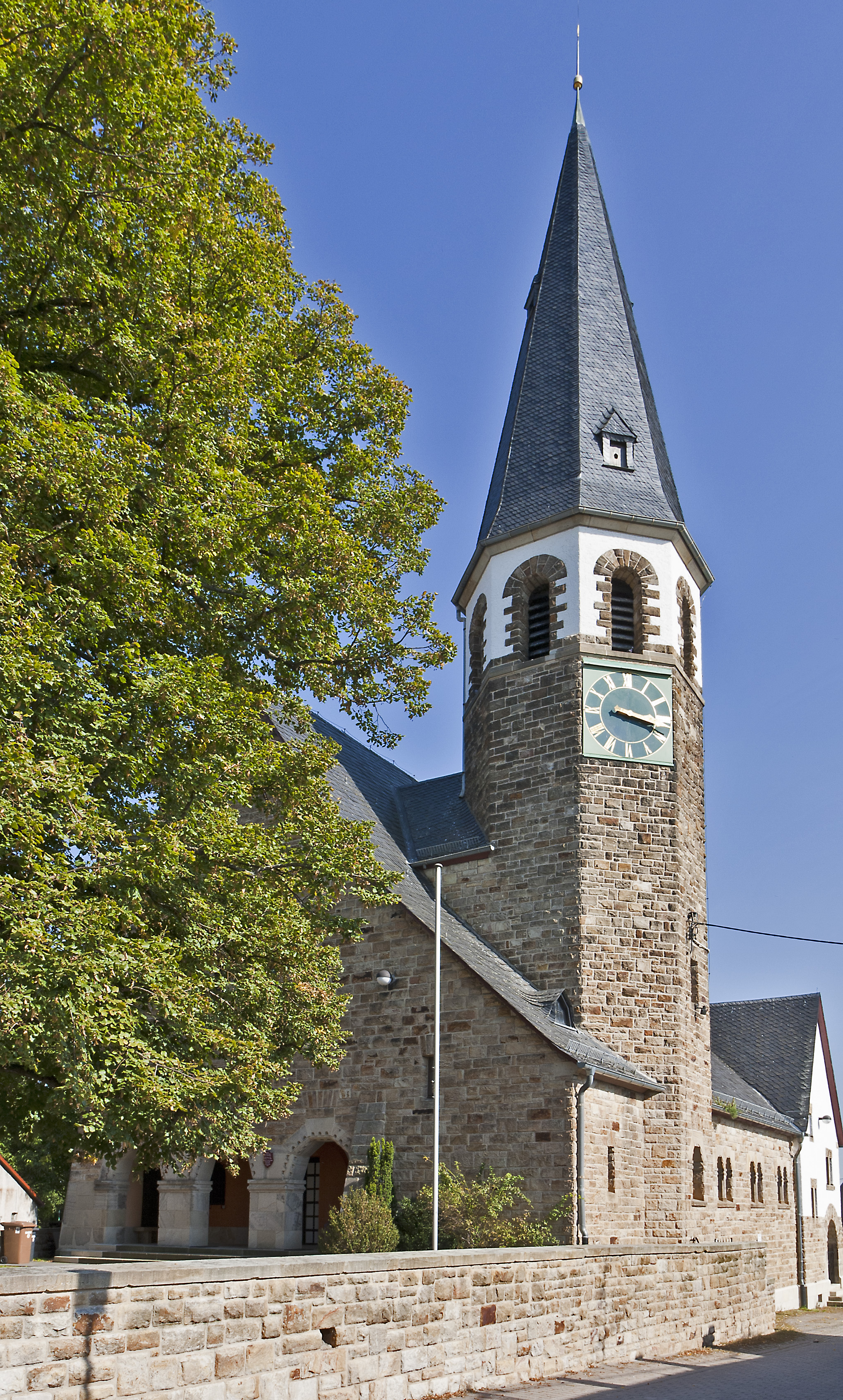
Brühlstraße 1 – Gustav-Adolf’s Evangelical Church

- Evangelical church, Brühlstraße 1 – two-naved galleried hall church with Romanesque elements, sandstone-block building, 1907/1908
- Binger Straße, graveyard – Wetzel-Diegel tomb, Neoclassical portal with galvanoplasty, about 1914
- Im Kloster 2-12 and others, former Augustinian Canonical Foundation (monumental zone) – founded about 1040, dissolved in 1566, reëstablished in 1697; former provostry church (Catholic Parish Church of the Assumption of Mary [Pfarrkirche Mariä Himmelfahrt]): Late Romanesque quire square, apse flanked by round towers, about 1230–1260, consecration in 1308; Late Baroque aisleless church with ridge turret about 1766, furnishings, sacristy from 1723; convent buildings: three-wing Baroque complex with mansard roofs, 1723 and years following; ringwall remnants (see also below)
- Klostergasse 14 – former Evangelical rectory, two-and-a-half-floor Late Classicist sandstone-block building, about 1850
- Kreuznacher Straße 3 – four-sided estate, from the earlier half of the 19th century; building with half-hip roof, timber framing plastered, about 1800
- Mittelgasse 1 – timber-frame house, plastered, 18th to early 19th century
- Mühlengasse 10 – hook-shaped estate; Baroque timber-frame house, partly solid, marked 1685, timber-frame barn
- Mühlengasse 11 – former monastery mill; four-sided estate; 1836 and years following; Late Classicist house, barn with half-hip roof, partly timber-frame
- Mühlengasse/corner of Sprendlinger Straße – warriors’ memorial 1870-1871, sandstone obelisk, last fourth of the 19th century
- Rathausstraße 8 – former town hall; essentially Late Gothic, possibly from about 1600, marked 1699, heavily made over in the 19th and 20th centuries
- Sprendlinger Straße 3 – estate complex; bungalow, gatehouse marked 1796
- Sprendlinger Straße 16 – Baroque timber-frame house, partly solid, apparently from 1761
- Former grindstone mill, on Landesstraße 413 – four-sided estate, mid 19th century, building with half-hip roof, quarrystone

=== More about the Augustinian Canonical Foundation and its church ===
The former Pfaffen-Schwabenheim Augustinian Canonical Foundation (Augustiner-Chorherrenstift Pfaffen-Schwabenheim) is the biggest Baroque monastery complex that has been preserved unaltered in Rhineland-Palatinate. The former provostry church (then known as the monastery or abbey church, now as the Catholic Parish Church of the Assumption of Mary, or Pfarrkirche Mariä Himmelfahrt in German) that was built into the Baroque complex is one of Rhineland-Palatinate's noteworthiest Late Romanesque churches, and it stands under the protection of the Hague Convention for the Protection of Cultural Property in the Event of Armed Conflict. Since August 2012 the church has also been a promotional project of the Deutsche Stiftung Denkmalschutz (German Foundation for Monument Protection). The abbey church itself unites Lower-Rhine and Upper-Rhine Romanesque with elements of the Gothic that came from France into a unique, harmonious ambiance. The church is made up of two parts that date from different times: the Late Romanesque quire and the Late Baroque nave. The Late Romanesque tapering quire is enclosed by an apse flanked by round towers and was built sometime in the years from 1230 to 1248. The transept, completed in 1260, has now vanished. In 1308 came the final consecration, whose 700th anniversary in 2008 was celebrated with a Pontifical High Mass with Karl Cardinal Lehmann. The Late Baroque aisleless nave was built onto the Late Romanesque quire in 1766, and in 1848 it was given a ridge turret. The convent buildings that were built between 1723 and 1764 form a three-winged Baroque complex with mansard roofs and elaborate stucco ceilings of the Mainz school of strapwork. The highlight among the stucco ceilings is the painted one in the former refectory measuring more than 90 m², which bears inscribed witness to the sponsor of these works, Charles III Philip, Elector Palatine. The last remnants of the ringwall that once girded the monastery were removed in 2003 when a new building zone was laid out.

=== Clubs ===
The following clubs are active in Pfaffen-Schwabenheim:

- Evangelischer Kirchenchor — Evangelical church choir
- Fördergemeinschaft Kirchen, Klosteranlagen und Kulturdenkmäler Pfaffen-Schwabenheim e.V. — promotional association for churches, monastery complexes and cultural monuments
- Gewerbeverein — business association
- Jugendförderverein — youth promotional association
- “Klosterbühne” Pfaffen-Schwabenheim e.V. — amateur theatrical group
- Kulturverein Pfaffen-Schwabenheim e.V. — cultural club
- Landfrauenverein — countrywomen's club
- Reit- und Fahrsportverein Pfaffen-Schwabenheim — driving and riding club
- Sozialverband VdK Rheinland Pfalz e.V. Ortsverband Pfaffen Schwabenheim — social advocacy group local chapter
- Turn- und Sportverein 1883 e.V. — gymnastic and sport club, with the following departments:
  - Badminton
  - Football (all ages)
  - Gymnastics (mother-child up to seniors)
  - Mini-trampoline
  - Nordic walking
  - Prellball
  - Rhythmic gymnastics and dance
  - Ski workout
  - Step aerobics
  - Volleyball

== Economy and infrastructure ==
=== Economic structure ===
Between the Appelbach (the local brook) and the Bosenberg (the local hill), the craft of winegrowing is practised in 160 ha of vineyards. Businesses plying other crafts, and some in the service sector, too, are located on 17 ha of land set aside for commercial use, offering local jobs. An advantage to local businesses is the favourable road links.

=== Winegrowing ===
Pfaffen-Schwabenheim belongs to the “Bingen Winegrowing Area” within the Rheinhessen wine region. Sixteen winegrowing businesses are active in the village, and the area currently given over to vineyards is 160 ha. Roughly 80% of the grapes are white wine varieties (as at 2007). In 1979, there were still 56 such businesses, and the area then given over to vineyards was slightly less at 141 ha. Among Pfaffen-Schwabenheim's other Weingüter (wineries) are these:

- Weinbau C.u.K. Balzer
- Weingut Gunther Schrauth
- Weingut Heinz-Willi Sonntag
- Weingut Karolinenhof
- Weingut Ralf u. Heike Petry
- Winzerhof Diegel

=== Transport ===
Pfaffen-Schwabenheim lies at the junction of Landesstraße 413 and Kreisstraße 91 (which becomes Kreisstraße 3 just southeast of the village at the boundary with the Mainz-Bingen district). Less than 2 km along Landesstraße 413 northeast of the village are interchanges with both Bundesstraße 50 and the Autobahn A 61 (Koblenz–Ludwigshafen). Serving neighbouring Sprendlingen is a railway station on the Rheinhessenbahn. Another serves neighbouring Bad Kreuznach with a variety of rail services. The Kreuznacher Straßen- und Vorortbahnen ("Kreuznach Tramways and Suburban Railways") ran a tramway from Bad Kreuznach to Pfaffen-Schwabenheim and beyond until it was closed in 1952.

=== Education ===
Pfaffen-Schwabenheim has a daycare centre with spaces for 75 children aged from 2 to 6 years, split into three mixed-age groups tended by a staff of nine. The children here are mainly from Pfaffen-Schwabenheim and neighbouring Pleitersheim. The Grundschule Pfaffen-Schwabenheim (primary school) is attended by 145 schoolchildren from Pfaffen-Schwabenheim, Badenheim, Pleitersheim, Volxheim and Biebelsheim.

=== Public institutions ===
Pfaffen-Schwabenheim has a village community centre with seating for up to 300, a public address system, a fully equipped kitchen, a stage and parking.

== Famous people ==
=== Sons and daughters of the town ===
- Ramona Diegel, Wine Queen of Rhenish Hesse 2012/2013 (“Ramona I”) and German Wine Princess 2013/2014
