= Pleitersheim =

- Municipality
- Coat of arms

- Location of Pleitersheim within Bad Kreuznach district
- Interactive map of Pleitersheim
- Location within Germany Location within Rhineland-Palatinate
- Coordinates: 49°50′12.34″N 7°57′10.87″E
- Country: Germany
- State: Rhineland-Palatinate
- District: Bad Kreuznach
- Municipal assoc.: Bad Kreuznach

Government
  - Mayor (2019–24): Bodo Ehrhardt

Area
  - Total: 2.32 km^{2} (0.90 sq mi)
- Elevation: 129 m (423 ft)

Population (2025-12-31)
  - Total: 341
  - Density: 147/km^{2} (381/sq mi)
- Time zone: UTC+01:00 (CET)
  - Summer (DST): UTC+02:00 (CEST)
- Postal codes: 55576
- Dialling codes: 06701
- Vehicle registration: KH
- Website: www.pleitersheim.de

Pleitersheim is an Ortsgemeinde – a municipality belonging to a Verbandsgemeinde, a kind of collective municipality – in the Bad Kreuznach district in Rhineland-Palatinate, Germany. It belongs to the Verbandsgemeinde of Bad Kreuznach, whose seat is in the like-named town, although this lies outside the Verbandsgemeinde. Pleitersheim is a winegrowing village.

== Geography ==
=== Location ===
Pleitersheim lies in the heart of Rhenish Hesse some 7 km east of downtown Bad Kreuznach on ground that slopes gently southeastwards to the Karlebach, a left-bank tributary to the Appelbach. The outlying countryside is barely wooded at all and is grouped with the Wöllsteiner Hügelland (“hill land”), which hosts intensive agricultural use. Pleitersheim borders on two neighbouring districts, Mainz-Bingen and Alzey-Worms.

=== Neighbouring municipalities ===
Clockwise from the north, Pleitersheim's neighbours are Pfaffen-Schwabenheim (likewise in the Bad Kreuznach district), Badenheim (in the Mainz-Bingen district), Wöllstein (in the Alzey-Worms district) and Volxheim (also in the Bad Kreuznach district). Although the town and district seat of Bad Kreuznach lies right nearby, Pleitersheim does not border directly on it.

== History ==
Pleitersheim, whose name is interpreted as “Blithen’s Home” – it may well have been named after a Frankish nobleman – can rightly look back on 1,200 years of existence since the nobleman in question came here with his entourage and servants. As with so many other villages in the region, Pleitersheim had its first documentary mention in monastic landhold directories. While the monks from Lorsch Abbey had landholds here as early as the 8th century – one source mentions the more specific date of 781 for the first documentary mention – Pleitersheim later belonged to the Lordship of Wöllstein. The monks enfeoffed the Raugraves with landholds and the court that had formerly been held by the Lordship of Wöllstein. Besides this comital family, the Rhinegraves, too, had landholds in the village quite early on. More decisive to the village's fate were the Raugraves, who held a castle in the village, and whose policies of pledging and selling off landholds in the 14th century also affected Pleitersheim. Owing to acquisitions in the 14th century, half the village belonged to the Counts of Sponheim and then, after they died out, to the heirs, the Electorate of the Palatinate, the Margraviate of Baden and Veldenz-Zweibrücken. In 1601, every one of the 22 hearths (for which read “households”) in the village belonged to Sponheim subjects. Only two persons were subject to the County of Wöllstein. In the 19th century, Pleitersheim – and likewise Tiefenthal – did not undergo any great growth in population as was observed everywhere else in the region. In 1846, there were 286 people living in the little village, more than at any other time in its history to this point. Thereafter, this figure began to shrink, until in 1939 it had bottomed out at 142 inhabitants. By 1950, though, this had risen back up to 215 inhabitants, but even so, a downward trend was once again seen over the years, with the population figure reaching 183 in 1980. The low population figure notwithstanding, there were enough interested people in the village in 1875 for a singing club to be founded. A few years later came the volunteer fire brigade. In 1911, Pleitersheim got electricity, which began to be transmitted to the village from Worms, but a watermain was not laid until 1950. Sewerage came even later, in 1973. The two world wars did not leave even a small village like Pleitersheim unscathed. In the First World War, seven citizens of the municipality lost their lives, while in the Second World War, 15 soldiers from the village did not come back.

=== Population development ===
Pleitersheim's population development since Napoleonic times is shown in the table below. The figures for the years from 1871 to 1987 are drawn from census data:

Year	Inhabitants
1815	213
1835	286
1871	212
1905	199
1939	142

Year	Inhabitants
1950	215
1961	214
1970	203
1987	196
2005	347

== Religion ==
As at 30 November 2013, there are 328 full-time residents in Pleitersheim, and of those, 163 are Evangelical (49.695%), 85 are Catholic (25.915%), 1 is Lutheran (0.305%), 1 (0.305%) belongs to another religious group and 78 (23.78%) either have no religion or will not reveal their religious affiliation.

== Politics ==
=== Municipal council ===
The council is made up of 8 council members, who were elected by proportional representation at the municipal election held on 7 June 2009, and the honorary mayor as chairman. The municipal election held on 7 June 2009 yielded the following results:

Year	SPD	CDU	WGR	Total
2009	4	2	2	8 seats
2004	5	2	1	8 seats

=== Mayor ===
Pleitersheim's mayor is Bodo Ehrhardt.

=== Coat of arms ===
The German blazon reads: Der Schild ist durch eine aufsteigende eingebogene Spitze in drei Felder geteilt. Feld 1 ist in Blau und Gold geschachtet, Feld 2 zeigt auf blauem, mit silbernen Kreuzchen bestreutem Grund einen steigenden, silbernen Löwen, silbern gekrönt und silbern gewehrt. Feld 3 zeigt in Rot ein silbernes sechsspeichiges Rad.

The municipality's arms might in English heraldic language be described thus: Tierced in mantle dexter chequy azure and Or, sinister azure semé of four crosses pattée argent a lion rampant of the same langued gules and in base gules a wheel spoked of six of the third.

The German blazon says that the lion is to be crowned (gekrönt), but the crown does not appear in the actual arms. It also does not specify that the crosses are to be pattée (with broadened ends).

There were no historical models for the municipal arms. Nobody could even confirm any old court seat from Pleitersheim. The coat of arms is thus a wholly modern creation, which interprets the village's history. Marshalled here are the heraldic devices formerly borne by Pleitersheim's longest ruling and most influential lords, namely the Counts of Sponheim, as represented by the “chequy” pattern on the dexter (armsbearer's right, viewer's left) side, the Counts of Nassau-Saarbrücken, as represented by the lion on the sinister (armsbearer's left, viewer's right) side and the Electorate of Mainz, as represented by the spoked wheel in base. Although the coat of arms itself may have no historical basis, each of the charges borne in it is drawn from arms once borne by these lords.

Counts of Sponheim

Counts of Nassau-Saarbrücken

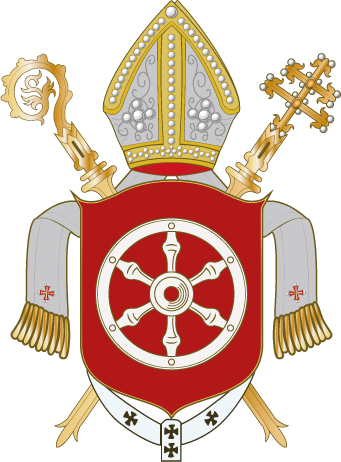
Archbishopric of Mainz

Pleitersheim

== Culture and sightseeing ==
=== Buildings ===
The following are listed buildings or sites in Rhineland-Palatinate’s Directory of Cultural Monuments:

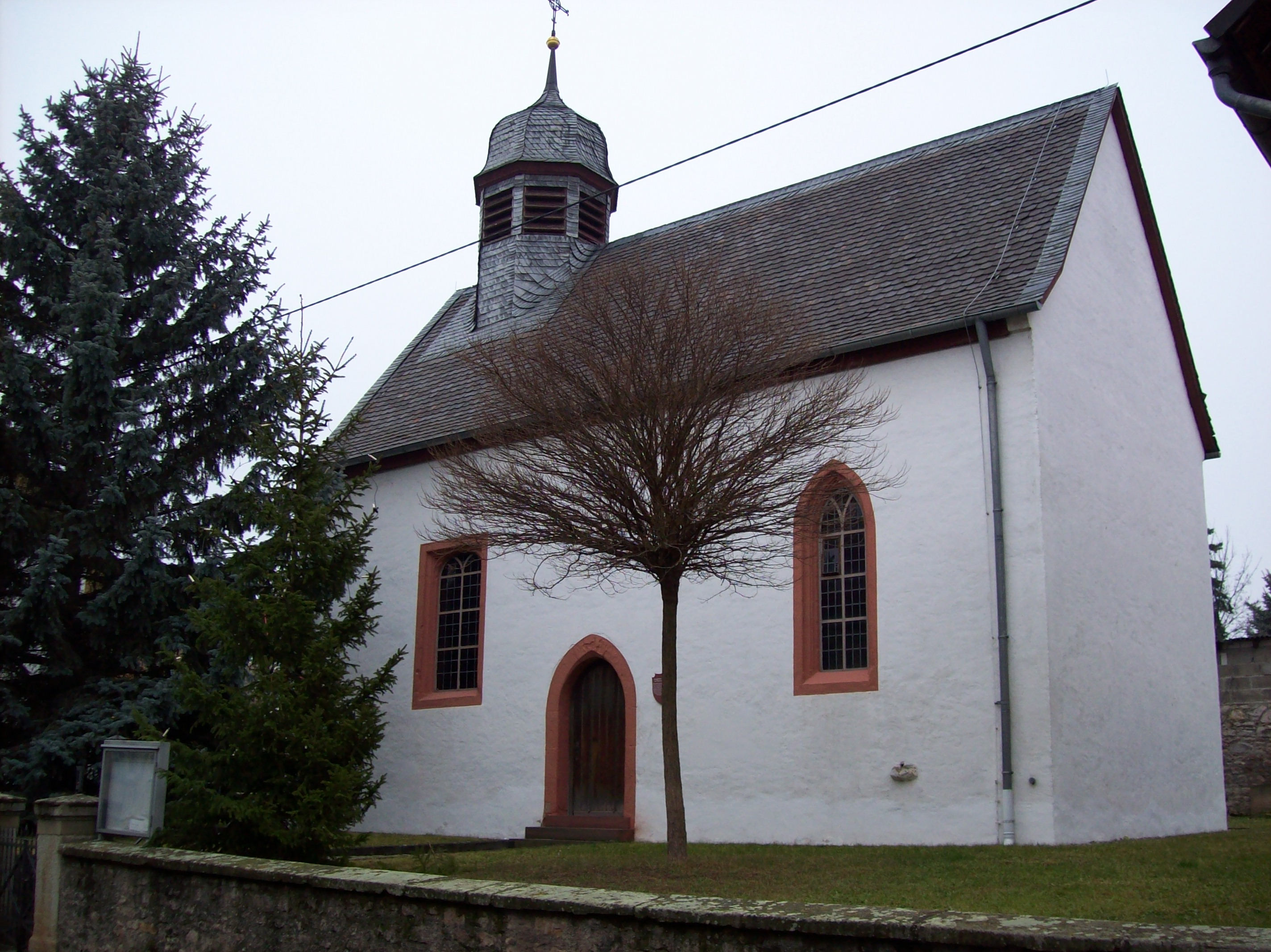
Hauptstraße 27 – Evangelical church

- Evangelical church, Hauptstraße 27 – former shared church, aisleless church, essentially Late Gothic, marked 1496, made over in Baroque, marked 1753
- Hauptstraße 21 – estate complex; timber-frame house, plastered, marked 1828
- Hauptstraße 25 – three-sided estate; timber-frame house, plastered, about 1800
- Hauptstraße 36 – estate complex; timber-frame house, partly solid, early 19th century

=== More about the church ===
The Evangelical church contains some important wall paintings depicting a Calvary scene, the Fourteen Holy Helpers and consecration crosses ascribed to the Pfaffen-Schwabenheim Augustinian canon Johannes von Goch from Eberhardsklausen Abbey in Klausen, painted about 1500 and rediscovered in 1950/1951.

=== Clubs ===
The following clubs are active in Pleitersheim:

- Feuerwehrverein Pleitersheim e.V. — fire brigade club
- Freiwillige Feuerwehr Pleitersheim — volunteer fire brigade
- Vereinigte Dorfjugend Pleitersheim — united village youth

== Economy and infrastructure ==
=== Winegrowing ===
Pleitersheim belongs to the “Bingen Winegrowing Area” within the Rhenish Hesse wine region (Rheinhessen). Four winegrowing businesses are active in the village, and the area currently given over to vineyards is 63 ha. Roughly 72% of the grapes are white wine varieties (as at 2007).

=== Transport ===
Pleitersheim lies on Kreisstraße 90 (which becomes Kreisstraße 2 just east of the village at the boundary with the Mainz-Bingen district). This leads eastwards to neighbouring Badenheim and southwestwards to neighbouring Volxheim, where there is a junction with Landesstraße 412. Pleitersheim lies within a frame made up of four Bundesstraßen, namely 41, 50, 420 and 428. The Autobahn A 61 (Koblenz–Ludwigshafen) also parallels Bundesstraße 50 just beyond Badenheim. Serving nearby Sprendlingen is a railway station on the Rheinhessenbahn. Another serves nearby Bad Kreuznach with a variety of rail services.
