= Gau Algesheim–Bad Kreuznach railway =

Railway line in Germany

Gau Algesheim–Bad Kreuznach
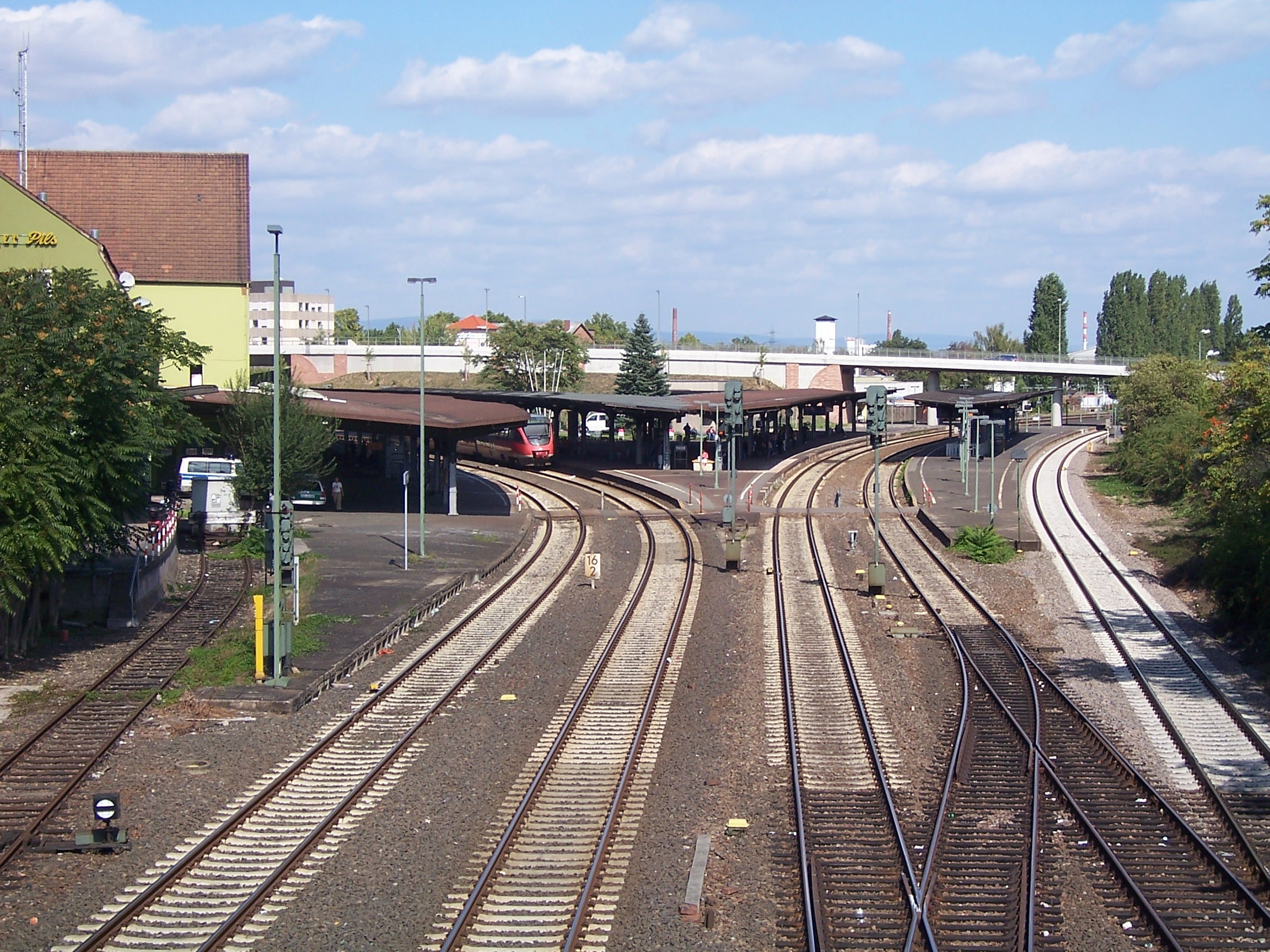
- Bad Kreuznach station, line from Gau Algesheim on right, line from Bingen on left.

Overview
- Line number: 3512
- Locale: Rhineland-Palatinate, Germany

Service
- Route number: 680

Technical
- Line length: 19.9 km (12.4 mi)
- Number of tracks: 2 (throughout)
- Track gauge: 1,435 mm (4 ft 8 1/2 in) standard gauge

The Gau Algesheim–Bad Kreuznach railway is a twin-track, non-electrified main line railway in the German state of Rhineland-Palatinate. It connects Gau-Algesheim on the Left Rhine line (German: Linke Rheinstrecke) with Bad Kreuznach on the Nahe Valley Railway (Nahetalbahn) and is thus part of a regionally important transport corridor between the two state capitals cities of Mainz and Saarbrücken in the Saarland.

== History ==
During and after the Franco-Prussian War of 1871, there were a number of rail projects to facilitate the transportation of troops and war matériel to the French border. In 1871, the Prussian state railways opened the Alsenz Valley Railway (Alsenztalbahn) from Bad Münster am Stein to Kaiserslautern. In 1879, a line from the Rhine-Main area parallel to the Nahe Valley Railway had already been discussed, but only at the end of the 19th century did it seriously figure in the War Department's plans.

The Gau Algesheim–Bad Kreuznach railway was opened as a strategic railway on 15 May 1902. It used a short section of the Rheinhessen Railway from Worms via Alzey to Bingen between Büdesheim-Dromersheim and Gensingen-Horrweiler.

In 1904, this was followed by a line on the east bank of the Nahe, connecting Bad Münster and Odernheim on the Glan Valley Railway (Glantalbahn) independently from the existing Nahe Valley Railway. The section between Bad Kreuznach and Bad Münster was rebuilt with four tracks.

The railway facilities in Bad Kreuznach were remodelled as part of the project. Kreuznach station was on the Nahe Valley Railway to the north of the city on the west side of the Nahe and Kreuznach Bad station was southeast of the centre of the town. On 25 February 1904, the town and the Prussian state railways agreed on the construction of a new central station at the junction of the two lines between the two old stations. Further consultation was required, partly because local residents and shopkeepers near the existing stations feared being disadvantaged and partly because the proposed name of the new station, Kreuznach Gabelung (“fork”) was considered a deterrent for tourism to the spa. The new station was opened under the name of Bad Kreuznach on 15 May 1905. The station building was inaugurated in 1908.

In 1915, the Hindenburg Bridge was opened over the Rhine between Bingen and Geisenheim, also as a strategic railway. The line ran from Rüdesheim and Geisenheim to Münster-Sarmsheim on the Nahe Valley Railway and it was connected by a double-track connection at Ockenheim to the line from Gau-Algesheim. There was also a connecting curve east of Ockenheim to the line to Bingen.

After the First World War, the Gau Algesheim–Bad Kreuznach railway became more important for passenger traffic. It was also served by express trains and in 1939 a pair of express trains ran between Saarbrücken, Frankfurt and Berlin on the line. Even after the Second World War, the line continued to be used by long-distance express trains until the 1990s.

In 1945, the Hindenburg Bridge was blown up and the connecting lines to it were closed. The old railway embankments are partially preserved and the connecting curve from Ockenheim towards Bingen can be easily seen today between the fruit trees that grow there.

== Route ==
The line starts in Gau Algesheim station on the Left Rhine line and first runs to the west. Until 1945 it converged in Ockenheim station with the twin-track line connecting Bingen and the Hindenburg Bridge (VzG line number 3513), which ran for about three kilometres parallel to the Gau Algesheim–Bad Kreuznach line.

The Gau Algesheim–Bad Kreuznach line crosses the Rheinhessen Railway and runs to Büdesheim–Dromersheim junction, where it joins the Rheinhessen Railway and they run together to the south. In Gensingen-Horrweiler station the two lines separate again. This once important station with three island platforms (each with two platform tracks) has now been reduced to a Haltepunkt ("halt", having no sets of points) with a platform track next to the station building and an island platform. The actual separation of the two lines has already occurred a kilometre to the north at Gensingen-Horrweiler junction; the single-track Rheinhessen line towards Alzey now uses only the easternmost of the three tracks.

To the south-west, the line continues through Planig, which is no longer a station for passengers, on the east bank of the Nahe to Bad Kreuznach, where it converges with the Nahe Valley Railway in Bad Kreuznach station.

== Passenger services ==
There are no longer any long-distance services on this line. Today only two regional services run on the line, both hourly.

Regional-Express service RE 3 stops on the line only in Bad Kreuznach and Gensingen-Horrweiler, while Regionalbahn service RB 33 stops at all stations.

Between Büdesheim-Dromersheim station and Sonderlager siding also runs the RB 35 (Rheinhessenbahn) service also runs on the strategic line.

Line	Route
RE 3	(Frankfurt (Main) –) Mainz – Ingelheim – Gau Algesheim – Bad Kreuznach – Kirn – Idar-Oberstein – Türkismühle – Saarbrücken
RB 33	Mainz – Ingelheim – Gau Algesheim – Bad Kreuznach – Kirn – Idar-Oberstein
RB 35	Bingen (Rhein) Stadt – Gensingen-Horrweiler – Gau-Bickelheim – Armsheim – Alzey – Flörsheim-Dalsheim – Monsheim – Worms
