= Biebelsheim =

- Municipality
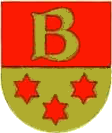
- Coat of arms

- Location of Biebelsheim within Bad Kreuznach district
- Interactive map of Biebelsheim
- Location within Germany Location within Rhineland-Palatinate
- Coordinates: 49°52′23″N 7°56′24″E
- Country: Germany
- State: Rhineland-Palatinate
- District: Bad Kreuznach
- Municipal assoc.: Bad Kreuznach

Government
  - Mayor (2019–24): Gabriele Schwarz-Müller

Area
  - Total: 3.10 km^{2} (1.20 sq mi)
- Elevation: 149 m (489 ft)

Population (2025-12-31)
  - Total: 729
  - Density: 235/km^{2} (609/sq mi)
- Time zone: UTC+01:00 (CET)
  - Summer (DST): UTC+02:00 (CEST)
- Postal codes: 55546
- Dialling codes: 06701
- Vehicle registration: KH
- Website: www.biebelsheim.de

Biebelsheim is an Ortsgemeinde – a municipality belonging to a Verbandsgemeinde, a kind of collective municipality – in the Bad Kreuznach district in Rhineland-Palatinate, Germany. It belongs to the Verbandsgemeinde of Bad Kreuznach, whose seat is in the like-named town, although this lies outside the Verbandsgemeinde.

== Geography ==
=== Location ===
Biebelsheim lies in Rhenish Hesse just east of the river Nahe some 6 km northeast of Bad Kreuznach, some 11 km south-southeast of Bingen am Rhein and 28 km southwest of Mainz. The municipality is characterized by agriculture and winegrowing.

=== Neighbouring municipalities ===
Clockwise from the north, Biebelsheim's neighbours are the municipality of Gensingen, the municipality of Welgesheim, the municipality of Zotzenheim, the municipality of Pfaffen-Schwabenheim and the town of Bad Kreuznach. Only the last two also lie within the Bad Kreuznach district, whereas all the others lie in the neighbouring Mainz-Bingen district.

== History ==
Indirect proof of the village's early existence comes from the Binger Mauerbauordnung (“Bingen Wall-Building Order”), which obliged, among many other places in the lower Nahe region, Biebelsheim to contribute to the Bingen town wall's upkeep. Biebelsheim, which from the latter half of the 13th century belonged exclusively to the Counts of Falkenstein and their heirs, was thereby annexed to the Habsburg hereditary domains. Biebelsheim was in this early time an exclave within the Falkenstein domains. Holding the title of Count at first were the Lords of Bolanden, with the Counts of Virneburg inheriting it in 1418. The county then went through a series of different landholders until it, along with Biebelsheim, eventually passed in 1667 to the Duke of Lorraine. With Duke of Lorraine Franz Stephan's marriage to Maria Theresa of Habsburg, Biebelsheim passed to Austria and was subject to the Oberamt of Winnweiler in Further Austria. Only the absorption of the village into French territory in the late 18th century and the attendant thorough change to the political map ended the more-than-500-year-old Falkenstein hegemony. In the 1560s – indeed no later than 1567 – Biebelsheim became Lutheran. Until the occupation of the region by the Spaniards early in the Thirty Years' War, only Protestant services were held at the church. However, it is unclear to what extent Catholics could use the church under Spanish military authority. During the tumultuous times of the 18th century and in the early 19th century, Biebelsheim shared the same fate as all the surrounding villages. It was occupied by French Revolutionary troops in 1792 and annexed under the terms of the Treaty of Campo Formio by France by reason of its once having been Austrian, and in 1814 the French forsook it, having been driven out in the last phase of the Napoleonic Wars. During French Revolutionary and Napoleonic times, Biebelsheim belonged to the Department of Mont-Tonnerre (or Donnersberg in German) and formed together with Ippesheim (now a constituent community of Bad Kreuznach) a mairie (“mayoralty”) that lasted until 1901. From 1814 to 1816, there was a joint Austrian-Bavarian administration in Kreuznach (later Worms). Then, in 1816, under the terms of the Congress of Vienna, Biebelsheim passed to the Grand Duchy of Hesse, where it was assigned to the newly created province of Rhenish Hesse. Details about events of any special meaning to Biebelsheim itself during this time are unknown. Biebelsheim's population development shows trends typical for the whole of Rhenish Hesse: in 1815, the village had 317 inhabitants. By 1846, the figure had risen by almost 120 to 435, and then by 1871, it had shrunk again to 384. In 1905, there was once again a higher figure, with 437 inhabitants. In the realm of social life, too, Biebelsheim did not distinguish itself from other places where it is known that from the mid 19th century there was lively club activity. In 1861, interested citizens got together in a singing club, although today this is no longer active. In 1883 came the gymnastic and sport club, while the volunteer fire brigade had been serving citizens at fires and other emergencies since 1891. Until 1901, the Bürgermeisterei (“Mayoralty”) of Biebelsheim-Ippesheim still existed, having been established during the French occupation. Biebelsheim then became a self-administering municipality for the first time. In 1911, the village received an electrical service from Worms. Watermains were installed along with sewerage in 1933. Since 1946, Biebelsheim has been part of the then newly founded state of Rhineland-Palatinate. But for a sudden growth in the population between the end of the Second World War and 1950, which saw the village's population swell to 514 with the arrival of ethnic Germans driven out of Germany's former eastern territories, Biebelsheim did not experience the quick rise in population that took place in other places nearby. From 1961 to 1970, the population even fell from 435 to 418.

=== Population development ===
Biebelsheim's population development since Napoleonic times is shown in the table below. The figures for the years from 1871 to 1987 are drawn from census data.

Year	Inhabitants
1815	317
1835	435
1871	384
1905	437
1939	390

Year	Inhabitants
1950	514
1961	435
1970	418
1987	512
2005	555

== Religion ==
As at 31 July 2013, there are 666 full-time residents in Biebelsheim, and of those, 251 are Evangelical (37.688%), 211 are Catholic (31.682%), 2 (0.3%) belong to the Alzey Free Religion Community, 39 (5.856%) belong to other religious groups and 163 (24.474%) either have no religion or will not reveal their religious affiliation.

== Politics ==
=== Municipal council ===
The council is made up of 12 council members, who were elected by majority vote at the municipal election held on 7 June 2009, and the honorary mayor as chairman.

=== Mayor ===
Biebelsheim's mayor is Gabriele Schwarz-Müller.

=== Coat of arms ===
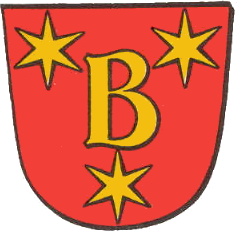
Other arms shown by rheinhessen.de

The German blazon reads: In geteiltem Schild oben ein goldener Buchstabe B in Rot, unten drei rote sechszackige Sterne in Gold.

The municipality's arms might in English heraldic language be described thus: Per fess gules the letter B Or and Or three mullets of the first.

The charge in the upper field, the letter B, refers to the village's name, Biebelsheim. The tinctures Or and gules (gold and red) are the ones formerly borne by the Lords of Bolanden as well as by their successors to the County of Falkenstein, the Counts of Virneburg and the Lords of Daun. The charges in the lower field, the three mullets (star shapes), are drawn from the 1537 Biebelsheim court seal. The website rheinhessen.de shows a different coat of arms for Biebelsheim, namely “Gules the letter B between three mullets, all Or” (shown at right).

== Culture and sightseeing ==
=== Buildings ===
The following are listed buildings or sites in Rhineland-Palatinate’s Directory of Cultural Monuments:

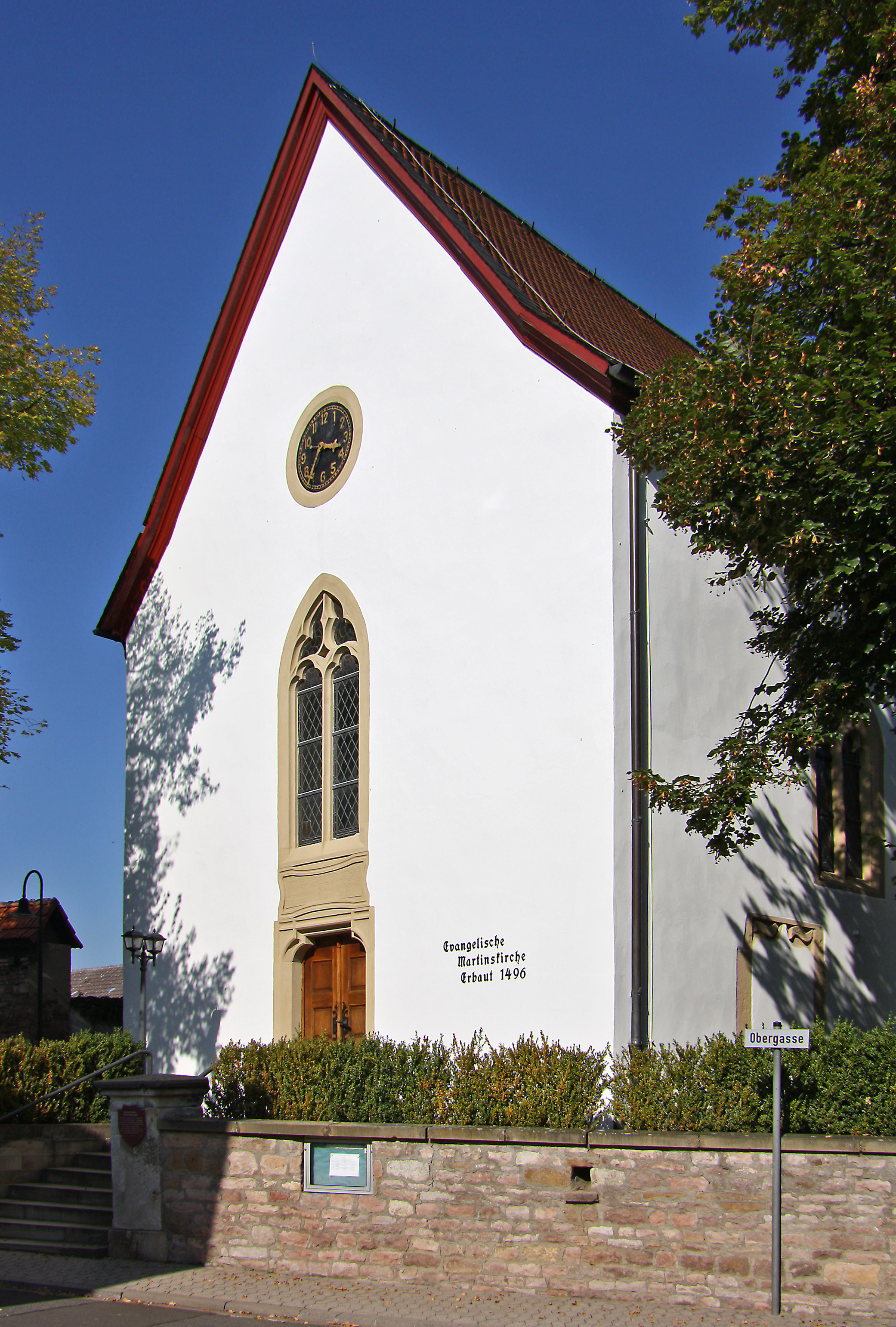
Obergasse 3: Saint Martin’s Evangelical Church

- Evangelical church, Obergasse 3 – formerly Saint Martin’s; Late Gothic aisleless church with reduced quire, marked 1496; at the church warriors’ memorial 1914-1918
- Backhausgasse 12 – estate complex, timber-frame house with gateway, marked 1808
- Backhausgasse 13 – three-sided estate, 18th or early 19th century
- Hauptstraße, at the graveyard – Johann Fischborn tomb, Late Gründerzeit aedicula with Renaissance motifs
- Hauptstraße 6 – winery; one-and-a-half-floor villalike clinker brick building, about 1890/1900
- Hauptstraße 30 – Villa Walldorf; Renaissance Revival, about 1880/90
- Obergasse 2 – timber-frame house, 17th century with window-height oriel
- Obergasse 4 – Baroque timber-frame house, 18th century
- (an) Obergasse 10 – Late Baroque portal with skylight, marked 1776
- Schulstraße 12 – former school; sandstone-block building, marked 1893
- Untergasse 4 – Baroque timber-frame house, 18th century

=== Clubs ===
The following clubs are active in Biebelsheim:

- Bauernverein Biebelsheim — farmers’ association
- Freiwillige Feuerwehr Biebelsheim — volunteer fire brigade
- Landfrauenverein Biebelsheim — countrywomen's club
- TSG Biebelsheim — gymnastic and sport club

== Economy and infrastructure ==
=== Winegrowing ===
Biebelsheim belongs to the “Bingen Winegrowing Area” within the Rheinhessen wine region. Fifteen winegrowing businesses are active in the village, and the area currently given over to vineyards is 109 ha. Roughly 63% of the grapes are white wine varieties (as at 2007). In 1979, there were still 36 such businesses, and the area then given over to vineyards was 123 ha. The local winemaking appellation – Großlage – is Sankt Rochuskapelle. Among other winegrowing operations in Biebelsheim are Weingut Herbert Hoch (Schulstraße 7), Weingut Johanninger (Hauptstraße 4-6), Weingut Rainer Köhler (Hauptstraße 12), Weingut Marco Mattioli (Hauptstraße 13), Weingut Gebrüder Mörsfelder (Backhausgasse 10), Weingut Schoeneck-Schnell (Obergasse 9) and Weingut Vogel-Fehlinger (outside the village at an Aussiedlerhof, a modern, post-war agricultural community). There is also a vine nursery, Rebschule Werner Magmer (Hauptstraße 19).

=== Transport ===
Biebelsheim lies not far from Bundesstraßen 41 and 50 and the Autobahn A 61. Serving Gensingen is a railway station where trains of both the Nahe Valley Railway (Bingen–Saarbrücken) and the Worms–Bingen Stadt railway stop.
