= Gensingen =

- Municipality
- Coat of arms

- Location of Gensingen within Mainz-Bingen district
- Interactive map of Gensingen
- Location within Germany Location within Rhineland-Palatinate
- Coordinates: 49°53′53″N 7°55′41″E
- Country: Germany
- State: Rhineland-Palatinate
- District: Mainz-Bingen
- Municipal assoc.: Sprendlingen-Gensingen

Government
  - Mayor (2019–24): Armin Brendel

Area
  - Total: 8.72 km^{2} (3.37 sq mi)
- Elevation: 90 m (300 ft)

Population (2025-12-31)
  - Total: 3,902
  - Density: 447/km^{2} (1,160/sq mi)
- Time zone: UTC+01:00 (CET)
  - Summer (DST): UTC+02:00 (CEST)
- Postal codes: 55457
- Dialling codes: 06727
- Vehicle registration: MZ
- Website: www.gensingen.de

Gensingen (German pronunciation: [ˈɡɛnzɪŋən]) is an Ortsgemeinde – a municipality belonging to a Verbandsgemeinde, a kind of collective municipality – in the Mainz-Bingen district in Rhineland-Palatinate, Germany.

== Geography ==
=== Location ===
Gensingen lies in Rhenish Hesse between Mainz and Bad Kreuznach on the river Nahe. It belongs to the Verbandsgemeinde of Sprendlingen-Gensingen, whose seat is in Sprendlingen.

=== Neighbouring municipalities ===
The municipality's neighbours are Grolsheim, Langenlonsheim, Horrweiler, Laubenheim, Welgesheim, Aspisheim, Biebelsheim, Ockenheim, Bretzenheim, Zotzenheim, Dorsheim, Sprendlingen and Bad Kreuznach-Ippesheim.

== Politics ==
=== Municipal council ===
The council is made up of 21 council members, counting the part-time mayor, with seats apportioned thus:

	SPD	CDU	FWG	Total
2004	9	7	4	20 seats

(as at municipal election held on 13 June 2004)

=== Coat of arms ===
The municipality's arms might be described thus: or, the letter G between three mullets of six sable.

While the letter G could stand for Gensingen, the arms’ meaning is not known. The six-pointed stars (“mullets of six”) are something of a mystery. The local court seal bore this composition in 1609.

== Culture and sightseeing ==
The Evangelical church has an historical Stumm organ built in 1774-1778 and restored in 2000. There are regular concerts.

== Economy and infrastructure ==
Two businesses in the municipality of Gensingen are the furniture manufacturer Bretz and the plant nursery company Kientzler.

=== Transport ===
The municipality is crossed by Bundesstraße 41. The Autobahn A 61 is right nearby, only a 3 km drive away. At the Gensingen railway station, trains on the Nahetalbahn and the Rheinhessenbahn (railway lines) stop.

== Famous people ==
- Reinhard Leisenheimer (b. 1939 in Gensingen), singer
