= Bingen (Rhein) Stadt station =

Railway station in Bingen am Rhein, Germany

Bingen (Rhein) Stadt
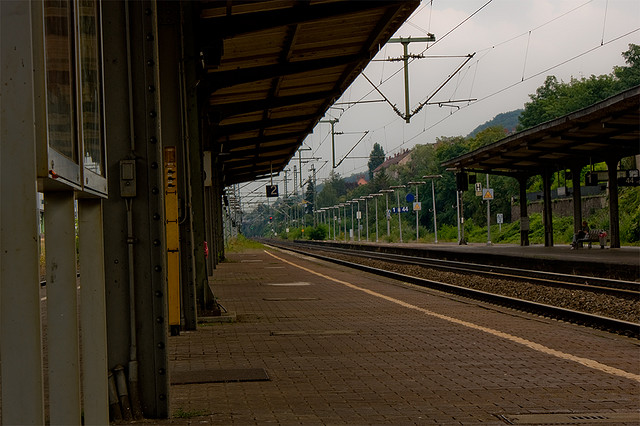

General information
- Location: Espenschiedstr. 1, Bingen am Rhein, Rhineland-Palatinate; Germany
- Coordinates: 49°58′11″N 7°54′19″E
- System: Through station
- Owner: Deutsche Bahn
- Operator: DB Station&Service
- Lines: West Rhine Railway (1.0 km) (KBS 470); Rheinhessen Railway (30.3 km) (KBS 662)
- Platforms: 4

Construction
- Architect: Hans Kleinschmidt

Other information
- Station code: 650
- DS100 code: FBGN
- IBNR: 8000976
- Category: 4
- Fare zone: RNN: 330; : 6880 (RNN transitional tariff)
- Website: www.bahnhof.de

History
- Opened: 1859

Services
Preceding station	DB Regio Mitte	Following station
Ingelheim towards Frankfurt (Main) Hbf	RE 2 Occasional services	Bingen Hbf towards Koblenz Hbf
Gensingen-Horrweiler towards Worms Hbf	RB 35	Terminus
Preceding station	Trans Regio	Following station
Bingen-Gaulsheim towards Mainz Hbf	RB 26	Bingen Hbf towards Köln Messe/Deutz
Location
- Location within Rhineland-Palatinate Location within Germany Location within Europe

Bingen (Rhein) Stadt station (Bingen town station) is, after Bingen Hauptbahnhof, the second largest station in the town of Bingen am Rhein in the German state of Rhineland-Palatinate. The station is located on the West Rhine Railway (German: Linke Rheinstrecke) between Koblenz to Mainz. Furthermore, the station is the beginning and end of the Rheinhessen Railway to/from Worms. The station is classified by Deutsche Bahn as a category 4 station.

== History ==
On 17 October 1859, the Hessian Ludwig Railway (Hessische Ludwigsbahn) opened the West Rhine Railway, which ran between Mainz and Bingen, initially only for freight operations. The station now called Bingen (Rhein) Stadt was opened with the line as the border station of the Grand Duchy of Hesse. On the other side of the border in Prussia, the Rhenish Railway Company operated its own station, then called Bingerbrück, but now called Bingen (Rhein) Hauptbahnhof (Bingen (Rhine) main station).

Around 1880 the station building was built to a design of the architect Hans Kleinschmidt. A relay interlocking in a gantry signal box spanning two tracks was put into operation in 1937. The Bingen Stadt signal box (Bnb) and the three signal boxes of Bingerbrück Ostturm (Bot), Bingerbrück Kreuzbach (Bkb) and Bingerbrück Westturm (Bwt) in the nearby Bingen Hbf were decommissioned on 3 February 1996 and replaced by the central interlocking Bf on the railway bridge at Bingen Hbf. Today, the Bingen Stadt Bnb signal box is protected as a monument.

== Location ==
Bingen (Rhein) Stadt station is two kilometres east of Bingen Hauptbahnhof, directly opposite the historic Rhine Crane and located in the centre of the town. The “town” station, through its adjoining bus station, has a better connection to the town’s bus network than the Hauptbahnhof.

== Platforms ==
Bingen (Rhein) Stadt station has four tracks on three platforms. The “home” platform on track 1 is served by MRB 32 services, running to Mainz Hauptbahnhof via Büdesheim (Bingen am Rhein), Gau-Algesheim, Ingelheim am Rhein, Heidesheim am Rhein, Heidenfahrt, Budenheim and Mainz-Mombach station. An underpass connects to the platform on tracks 2 and 3. Track 2 is served by trains towards Bingen Hauptbahnhof and continuing via Bacharach, Oberwesel, St. Goar and Boppard to Koblenz. Platform 3 serves only as an alternative track to allow the overtaking of slower trains. South of platform 1 is a bay platform with an extra platform. This platform is numbered 44. Platform 44 is used by the trains of the Rheinhessen Railway to Worms Hauptbahnhof via Gensingen-Horrweiler, Armsheim, Alzey and Monsheim.

Platform 44 is the only platform that has been made accessible for the disabled. The other three platforms and the underpass are not accessible.

== Rail services ==
Bingen (Rhein) Stadt station is mainly served by regional services, but the RE 2 service between Frankfurt and Koblenz occasionally stops. It is served by the MittelrheinBahn (RB 26, Koblenz–Boppard–Bingen–Mainz) service operated by trans regio. The station is the beginning of services operated by DB Regio on the Rheinhessen Railway to Worms (RB 35).

Line	Line name	Route	Frequency
RE 2	Südwest-Express	Frankfurt Hbf – Frankfurt Airport Regional – Rüsselsheim – Mainz Hbf – Bingen (Rhein) Hbf – Bingen (Rhein) Stadt – Boppard Hbf – Koblenz Hbf	Some trains
RB 26	Mittelrheinbahn	Cologne – Bonn – Remagen – Andernach – Koblenz – Boppard – Oberwesel – Bingen – Bingen (Rhein) Stadt – Ingelheim – Mainz	Hourly
RB 35	Rheinhessenbahn	Worms – Monsheim – Alzey – Armsheim – Gau-Bickelheim – Gensingen-Horrweiler – Bingen (Rhein) Stadt	Hourly
