= Aspisheim =

- Municipality
- Coat of arms

- Location of Aspisheim within Mainz-Bingen district
- Interactive map of Aspisheim
- Location within Germany Location within Rhineland-Palatinate
- Coordinates: 49°54′27″N 7°58′56″E
- Country: Germany
- State: Rhineland-Palatinate
- District: Mainz-Bingen
- Municipal assoc.: Sprendlingen-Gensingen

Government
  - Mayor (2019–24): Gunter Dautermann

Area
  - Total: 5.81 km^{2} (2.24 sq mi)
- Elevation: 175 m (574 ft)

Population (2025-12-31)
  - Total: 839
  - Density: 144/km^{2} (374/sq mi)
- Time zone: UTC+01:00 (CET)
  - Summer (DST): UTC+02:00 (CEST)
- Postal codes: 55459
- Dialling codes: 06727
- Vehicle registration: MZ
- Website: www.aspisheim.de

Aspisheim is an Ortsgemeinde – a municipality belonging to a Verbandsgemeinde, a kind of collective municipality – in the Mainz-Bingen district in Rhineland-Palatinate, Germany.

== Geography ==
=== Location ===
Aspisheim lies in Rhenish Hesse between Mainz and Bad Kreuznach. The municipality is administered by the Verbandsgemeinde of Sprendlingen-Gensingen, whose seat is in Sprendlingen.

== Politics ==
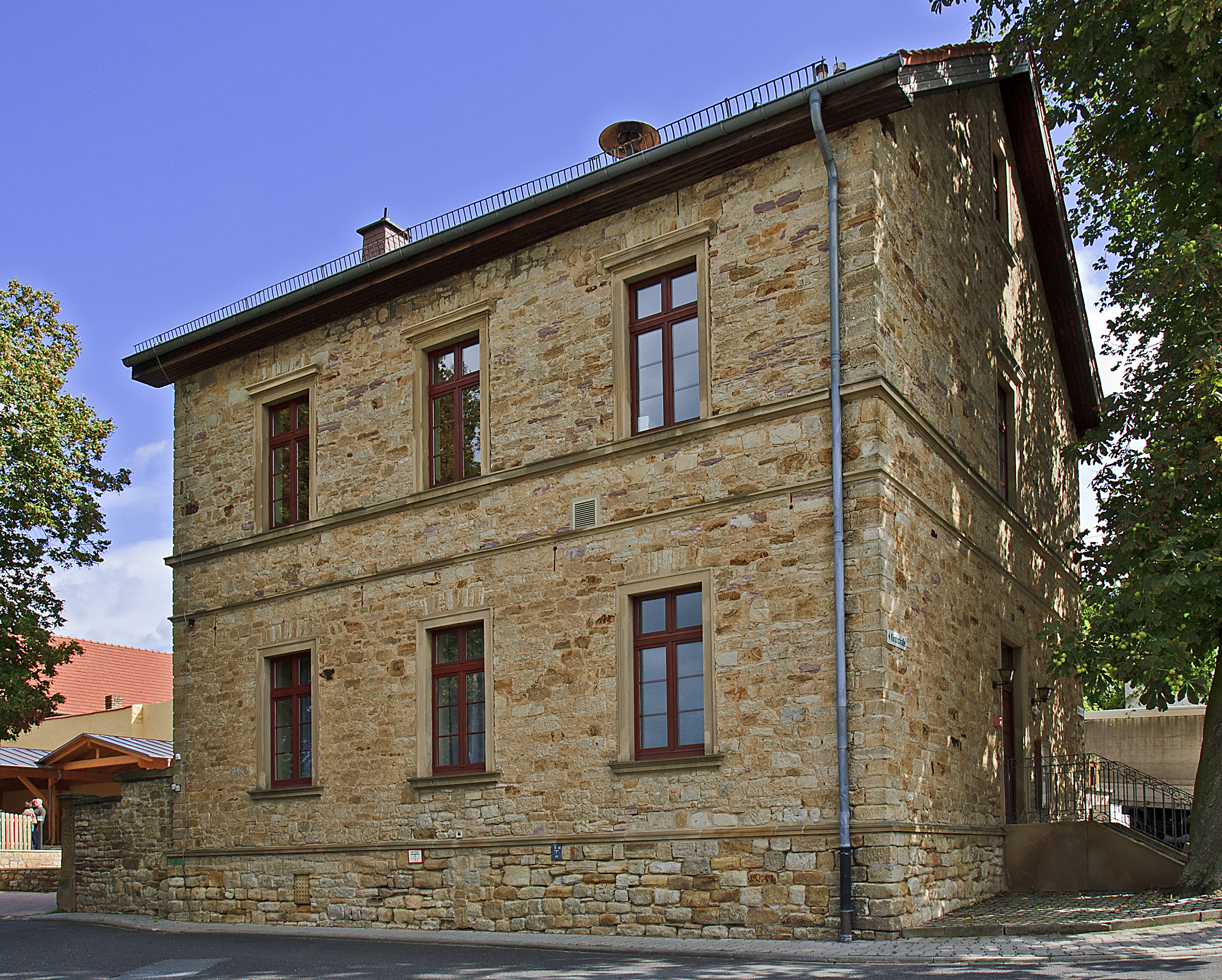
Aspisheim Town hall

=== Municipal council ===
The council is made up of 13 council members, counting the part-time mayor, with seats apportioned thus:

Elections	FDP	Free voters FWG	Free voters WGG	Total
2014	4	4	4	12 seats
2009	7	5	–	12 seats
2004	7	5	–	12 seats

- FWG = Freie Wählergruppe Aspisheim e.V.

=== Coat of arms ===
The municipality's arms might be described thus: Per pale Or a yarn swift sable palewise and sable a lion rampant Or armed argent and langued gules.

== Culture and sightseeing ==
=== Regular events ===
On the next-to-last weekend in August the municipality's residents stage the Rothesfest, a wine and street festival.

== Economy and infrastructure ==
=== Transport ===
The municipality is crossed by the L 414 state road . The A 61 motorway runs roughly 4 km away from the municipality.
