= Bad Kreuznach (Verbandsgemeinde) =

- Verbandsgemeinde
- Location of Bad Kreuznach within Bad Kreuznach district
- Interactive map of Bad Kreuznach
- Location within Germany Location within Rhineland-Palatinate
- Coordinates: 49°48′N 7°54′E
- Country: Germany
- State: Rhineland-Palatinate
- District: Bad Kreuznach
- Seat: Bad Kreuznach
- Subdivisions: 13 municipalities

Area
  - Total: 73.7 km^{2} (28.5 sq mi)

Population (2025-12-31)
  - Total: 13,715
  - Density: 186/km^{2} (482/sq mi)
- Time zone: UTC+01:00 (CET)
  - Summer (DST): UTC+02:00 (CEST)
- Website: www.vg-badkreuznach.de

Bad Kreuznach is a Verbandsgemeinde ("collective municipality") in the district of Bad Kreuznach, Rhineland-Palatinate, Germany. The seat of the Verbandsgemeinde is in the town Bad Kreuznach, itself not part of the Verbandsgemeinde. The municipalities lie south and east of the town of Bad Kreuznach. The entire Verbandsgemeinde is 73.7 square kilometers large and has about 14,000 inhabitants.

The Verbandsgemeinde Bad Kreuznach consists of the following Ortsgemeinden ("local municipalities"):

1. Altenbamberg
2. Biebelsheim
3. Feilbingert
4. Frei-Laubersheim
5. Fürfeld
6. Hackenheim
7. Hallgarten
8. Hochstätten
9. Neu-Bamberg
10. Pfaffen-Schwabenheim
11. Pleitersheim
12. Tiefenthal
13. Volxheim
