= Sprendlingen-Gensingen =

- Verbandsgemeinde
- Coat of arms

- Location of Sprendlingen-Gensingen within Mainz-Bingen district
- Interactive map of Sprendlingen-Gensingen
- Location within Germany Location within Rhineland-Palatinate
- Coordinates: 49°52′N 07°59′E
- Country: Germany
- State: Rhineland-Palatinate
- District: Mainz-Bingen
- Seat: Sprendlingen
- Subdivisions: 10 Ortsgemeinden

Government
  - Mayor (2018–26): Manfred Scherer

Area
  - Total: 56.07 km^{2} (21.65 sq mi)

Population (2025-12-31)
  - Total: 14,382
  - Density: 256.5/km^{2} (664.3/sq mi)
- Time zone: UTC+01:00 (CET)
  - Summer (DST): UTC+02:00 (CEST)
- Vehicle registration: MZ
- Website: www.sprendlingen-gensingen.de

Sprendlingen-Gensingen is a Verbandsgemeinde ("collective municipality") in the district Mainz-Bingen, in Rhineland-Palatinate, Germany. It is situated approximately 10 km (6.2 mi) south-east of Bingen, and 25 km (16 mi) south-west of Mainz. Sprendlingen is the seat of the municipality.

The Verbandsgemeinde Sprendlingen-Gensingen consists of the following Ortsgemeinden ("local municipalities"):

1. Aspisheim
2. Badenheim
3. Gensingen
4. Grolsheim
5. Horrweiler
6. Sankt Johann
7. Sprendlingen
8. Welgesheim
9. Wolfsheim
10. Zotzenheim
