= Sankt Johann, Mainz-Bingen =

Sankt Johann
- Municipality
- Coat of arms

- Location of Sankt Johann within Mainz-Bingen district
- Interactive map of Sankt Johann
- Location within Germany Location within Rhineland-Palatinate
- Coordinates: 49°52′06″N 08°01′09″E
- Country: Germany
- State: Rhineland-Palatinate
- District: Mainz-Bingen
- Municipal assoc.: Sprendlingen-Gensingen

Government
  - Mayor (2019–24): Hans Bergmann

Area
  - Total: 5.66 km^{2} (2.19 sq mi)
- Elevation: 150 m (490 ft)

Population (2025-12-31)
  - Total: 858
  - Density: 152/km^{2} (393/sq mi)
- Time zone: UTC+01:00 (CET)
  - Summer (DST): UTC+02:00 (CEST)
- Postal codes: 55578
- Dialling codes: 06701
- Vehicle registration: MZ
- Website: www.sprendlingen-gensingen.de

Sankt Johann (German pronunciation: [zaŋkt ˈjoːhan]) is an Ortsgemeinde – a municipality belonging to a Verbandsgemeinde, a kind of collective municipality – in the Mainz-Bingen district in Rhineland-Palatinate, Germany.

== Geography ==
The municipality lies in Rhenish Hesse and belongs to the Verbandsgemeinde of Sprendlingen-Gensingen, whose seat is in Sprendlingen.

== History ==
The typical Rhenish-Hessian wine village was known in the Middle Ages as Weiler Megelsheim (Weiler means “hamlet” in German) and had its first documentary mention in 1220.

== Culture and sightseeing ==
=== Buildings ===
The municipality's landmark is the High Gothic Evangelical Johanniskirche (Saint John's Church) with an important Oberndörfer organ from 1793. This church was built as a pilgrimage church in the latter half of the 14th century by the Counts of Sponheim. It is consecrated to John the Baptist. Worth seeing are the church's mediaeval wall paintings and the modern church windows by Heinz Hindorf.

=== Sport ===
Up above the community, on the Wißberg, is a golf course.

=== Regular events ===
There are regular concerts at Saint John's Church.

The Sankt Johanner Jahrmarkt, a yearly market, goes back to the Middle Ages and is held on the weekend following Midsummer

== Notable people ==
- Erika Hofmann, German Wine Queen, 1954/1955
