= Welgesheim =

- Municipality
- Coat of arms

- Location of Welgesheim within Mainz-Bingen district
- Interactive map of Welgesheim
- Location within Germany Location within Rhineland-Palatinate
- Coordinates: 49°52′56″N 07°57′43″E
- Country: Germany
- State: Rhineland-Palatinate
- District: Mainz-Bingen
- Municipal assoc.: Sprendlingen-Gensingen

Government
  - Mayor (2019–24): Michael Leisenheimer

Area
  - Total: 2.03 km^{2} (0.78 sq mi)
- Elevation: 105 m (344 ft)

Population (2025-12-31)
  - Total: 574
  - Density: 283/km^{2} (732/sq mi)
- Time zone: UTC+01:00 (CET)
  - Summer (DST): UTC+02:00 (CEST)
- Postal codes: 55576
- Dialling codes: 06701
- Vehicle registration: MZ
- Website: www.welgesheim.de

Welgesheim (German pronunciation: [ˈvɛlɡəshaɪm]) is an Ortsgemeinde – a municipality belonging to a Verbandsgemeinde, a kind of collective municipality – in the Mainz-Bingen district in Rhineland-Palatinate, Germany.

== Geography ==
Welgesheim lies in Rhenish Hesse between Mainz and Bad Kreuznach. It belongs to the Verbandsgemeinde of Sprendlingen-Gensingen, whose seat is in Sprendlingen.

== History ==
Welgesheim lies on the spot where once the old military road crossed the river Wiesbach. During excavation work several graves were unearthed, leading to the conclusion that there was once a Roman settlement in what is now Welgesheim's municipal area.

The place called Wellingesheim itself had its first documentary mention in 770 in the Lorsch codex. In 874 it appeared under the name Willengisheim and in 1178 as Wellengesheim. Under its current name it appeared about 1194, when Werner von Bolanden was enfeoffed with the church treasure at Welgesheim by Count Lon.

Later, Welgesheim belonged to the lordly domain of the Elector of the Palatinate, with whom the place remained until the late 18th century.

Under Napoleon, Welgesheim belonged as part of the department of Mont-Tonnerre (Donnersberg) from 1801 to 1814 to France, with its attendant laws, such as the Napoleonic Code.

In the wake of the Congress of Vienna in 1814 and 1815, the Rhenish-Hessian area was awarded to Hesse-Darmstadt, thereby likewise putting Welgesheim in the Grand Duchy of Hesse-Darmstadt, which was surrounded by the Bavarian Palatinate in the south, the Prussian Governmental Region of Koblenz in the west and the Duchy of Nassau in the north.

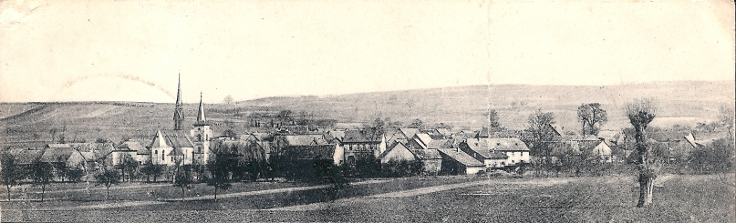
Panoramic view of Welgesheim from 1896

This was the case for a hundred years, until Germany's defeat in the First World War, when the Grand Duchy of Hesse-Darmstadt was dissolved. Thereafter the region of Rhenish Hesse belonged to the People's State of Hesse, which existed until 1945.

After the Federal Republic of Germany was founded in the wake of the Second World War, Welgesheim belonged to the newly founded state of Rhineland-Palatinate (Rheinland-Pfalz), and, now also lying within the district of Mainz-Bingen, it still does.

== Politics ==
=== Municipal council ===
The council is made up of 13 council members, counting the part-time mayor, with seats apportioned thus:

	SPD	CDU	FWG	Total
2004	2	3	7	12 seats

(as at municipal election held on 13 June 2004)

=== Coat of arms ===
The municipality's arms might be described thus: Or an arrow sable palewise, in chief sinister a crown azure with merlons fleuretty.

== Culture and sightseeing ==
=== Music ===
Several musical artists originate from this area including the musical group Alle-für-Alle.

=== Buildings ===
Welgesheim has three Heiligenhäuschen (small, chapel-like wayside buildings each consecrated to a saint), a monument, an Evangelical church and a Catholic church.

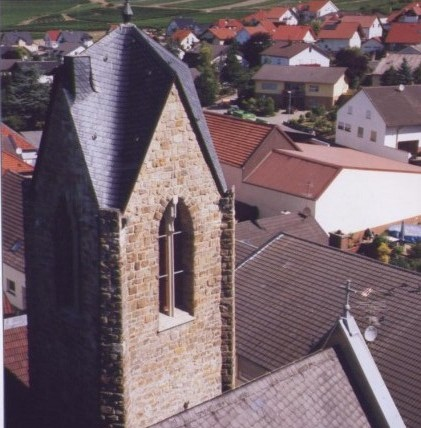
Churchtower at Welgesheim's Catholic church

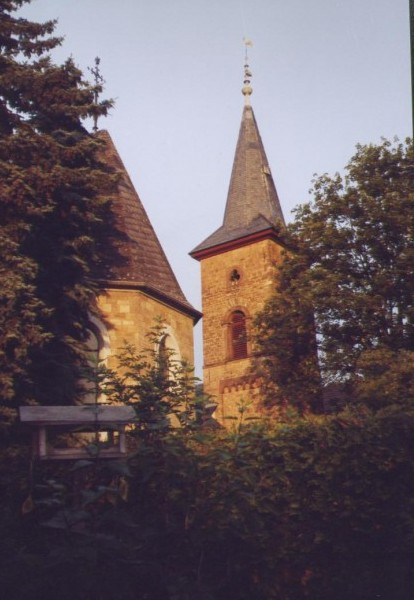
Churchtower at Welgesheim's Evangelical church

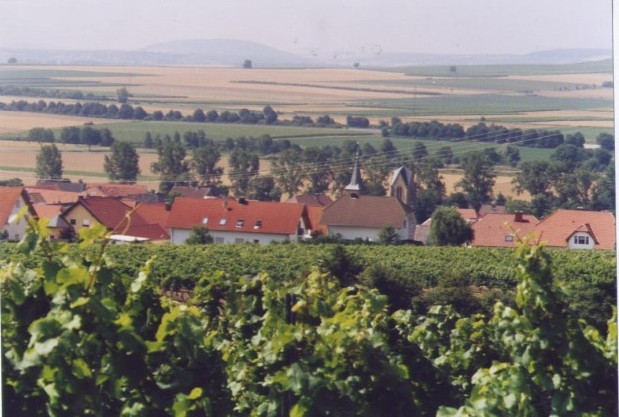
View over Welgesheim

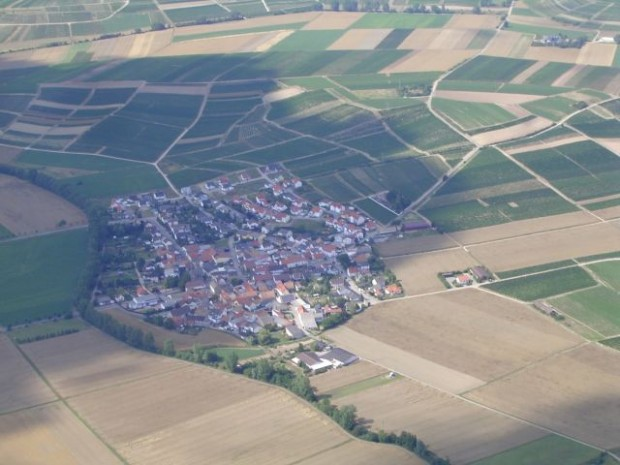
Aerial view of Welgesheim

=== Sport ===
Besides table tennis, gymnastics, badminton and dancing, there are in Welgesheim team handball players who mostly play in Zotzenheim/St. Johann/Sprendlingen. The Schneider family, above all, turns out many talented team handball players.

== Famous people ==
=== Honorary citizens ===
- Adelbert Lukas
- Joseph-Alfons Schnorrenberger

== Economy and infrastructure ==
=== Transport ===
- The Autobahn A 61 runs through the municipal area. The nearest interchange is Bad Kreuznach, some 3 km away.
- Welgesheim lies within the area served by the Rhein-Nahe-Nahverkehrsverbund (local transport association). In the municipality stands the railway station Welgesheim-Zotzenheim on the Rheinhessenbahn between Bingen and Worms. This is served hourly by DB Regio Regionalbahn trains.

=== Public institutions ===
- Edith Stein Catholic kindergarten
- Weindorfhalle at the old school building (mayor's seat with council chamber and municipal library)
- Weedestubb, a pleasantly comfortable room for festivals and family celebrations, which before its conversion housed the volunteer fire brigade. The name came about in the local speech from the building's location on the central square in Welgesheim, the Weedeplatz.
