= Grolsheim =

- Municipality
- Coat of arms

- Location of Grolsheim within Mainz-Bingen district
- Interactive map of Grolsheim
- Location within Germany Location within Rhineland-Palatinate
- Coordinates: 49°54′38″N 7°55′00″E
- Country: Germany
- State: Rhineland-Palatinate
- District: Mainz-Bingen
- Municipal assoc.: Sprendlingen-Gensingen

Government
  - Mayor (2019–24): Matthias Hang

Area
  - Total: 3.92 km^{2} (1.51 sq mi)
- Elevation: 99 m (325 ft)

Population (2025-12-31)
  - Total: 1,307
  - Density: 333/km^{2} (864/sq mi)
- Time zone: UTC+01:00 (CET)
  - Summer (DST): UTC+02:00 (CEST)
- Postal codes: 55459
- Dialling codes: 06727
- Vehicle registration: MZ
- Website: www.grolsheim.de

Grolsheim is an Ortsgemeinde – a municipality belonging to a Verbandsgemeinde, a kind of collective municipality – in the Mainz-Bingen district in Rhineland-Palatinate, Germany.

== Geography ==
=== Location ===
Grolsheim lies in Rhenish Hesse between Mainz and Bad Kreuznach on the river Nahe. It belongs to the Verbandsgemeinde of Sprendlingen-Gensingen, whose seat is in Sprendlingen.

== Politics ==
=== Municipal council ===
The council is made up of 13 council members, counting the part-time mayor, with seats apportioned thus:

| | Wählergruppe Nauheimer | Wählergruppe Bensch | Total |
| 2004 | 11 | 1 | 12 seats |

(as at municipal election held on 13 June 2004)

On 7 July 2008, the serving mayor (Bürgermeister) Frank Nauheimer tendered his resignation on grounds that were then unexplained. It later became known that the Mainz State Prosecutor (Staatsanwaltschaft Mainz) was investigating Frank Nauheimer on suspicion of his having misappropriated monies.

On 3 November 2008, charges were laid against Grolsheim's former mayor by the Mainz State Prosecutor. It was put to him that, in 91 cases, he had embezzled funds, and that in one case he had falsified a document. All together, the loss was said to have been €640,000. Beginning on 14 July 2008, Frank Nauheimer, who only days earlier had turned himself in to the Mainz State Prosecutor, found himself in custody at the Rohrbach detention centre in Wöllstein.

On 13 January 2009, Frank Nauheimer was sentenced by the Mainz State Court to a prison term of four years. He had earlier made a sweeping confession.

The case caused a sensation, as Frank Nauheimer had been admired as an outstanding politician who had an illustrious career behind him and had been greatly respected in his municipality.

=== Coat of arms ===
The municipality's arms might be described thus: Argent in base a mount of three vert, issuant from the higher, middle knoll a cross pattée sable, from each of the other two a rose gules barbed and slipped of the second and seeded Or.

== Economy and infrastructure ==
The Rumpfmühle is still an active mill today.

=== Transport ===
The municipality lies on Bundesstraße 50. The A 61 (Autobahn) runs right nearby.

A bus route between Bingen and Bad Kreuznach links Grolsheim to the local public transport network.
