= Badenheim =

- Municipality
- Coat of arms

- Location of Badenheim within Mainz-Bingen district
- Interactive map of Badenheim
- Location within Germany Location within Rhineland-Palatinate
- Coordinates: 49°50′37″N 7°58′06″E
- Country: Germany
- State: Rhineland-Palatinate
- District: Mainz-Bingen
- Municipal assoc.: Sprendlingen-Gensingen

Government
  - Mayor (2019–24): Jan Ott

Area
  - Total: 4.33 km^{2} (1.67 sq mi)
- Elevation: 120 m (390 ft)

Population (2025-12-31)
  - Total: 625
  - Density: 144/km^{2} (374/sq mi)
- Time zone: UTC+01:00 (CET)
  - Summer (DST): UTC+02:00 (CEST)
- Postal codes: 55576
- Dialling codes: 06701
- Vehicle registration: MZ
- Website: www.badenheim.de

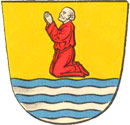
Badenheim's coat of arms about 1608

Badenheim (German pronunciation: [ˈbaːdn̩haɪm]) is an Ortsgemeinde – a municipality belonging to a Verbandsgemeinde, a kind of collective municipality – in the Mainz-Bingen district in Rhineland-Palatinate, Germany. It belongs to the Verbandsgemeinde of Sprendlingen-Gensingen, whose seat is in Sprendlingen.

== Geography ==
The municipality lies west of Bundesstraße 50 at the northwest outliers of the Rhenish Hesse hills some 10 km east of the town of Bad Kreuznach.

== Culture and sightseeing ==
Badenheim has a Catholic church from the Baroque period as well as an Evangelical church in the Classicist style. Also worth seeing are timber-frame houses and wineries.
