= Volxheim =

- Municipality
- Coat of arms

- Location of Volxheim within Bad Kreuznach district
- Interactive map of Volxheim
- Location within Germany Location within Rhineland-Palatinate
- Coordinates: 49°49′5.35″N 7°55′38.18″E
- Country: Germany
- State: Rhineland-Palatinate
- District: Bad Kreuznach
- Municipal assoc.: Bad Kreuznach

Government
  - Mayor (2024–29): Axel Walter

Area
  - Total: 4.91 km^{2} (1.90 sq mi)
- Elevation: 160 m (520 ft)

Population (2025-12-31)
  - Total: 1,152
  - Density: 235/km^{2} (608/sq mi)
- Time zone: UTC+01:00 (CET)
  - Summer (DST): UTC+02:00 (CEST)
- Postal codes: 55546
- Dialling codes: 06703
- Vehicle registration: KH
- Website: www.volxheim.de

Volxheim is a municipality in the district of Bad Kreuznach in Rhineland-Palatinate, in western Germany. It is situated 7 km south-east of Bad Kreuznach, and it is part of the Verbandsgemeinde Bad Kreuznach.
