= Horrweiler =

- Municipality
- Coat of arms

- Location of Horrweiler within Mainz-Bingen district
- Interactive map of Horrweiler
- Location within Germany Location within Rhineland-Palatinate
- Coordinates: 49°53′54″N 7°57′47″E
- Country: Germany
- State: Rhineland-Palatinate
- District: Mainz-Bingen
- Municipal assoc.: Sprendlingen-Gensingen

Government
  - Mayor (2019–24): Eckhard Siegfried

Area
  - Total: 4.39 km^{2} (1.69 sq mi)
- Elevation: 135 m (443 ft)

Population (2025-12-31)
  - Total: 871
  - Density: 198/km^{2} (514/sq mi)
- Time zone: UTC+01:00 (CET)
  - Summer (DST): UTC+02:00 (CEST)
- Postal codes: 55457
- Dialling codes: 06727
- Vehicle registration: MZ
- Website: www.horrweiler.de

Horrweiler (German pronunciation: [ˈhɔʁvaɪlɐ]) is an Ortsgemeinde – a municipality belonging to a Verbandsgemeinde, a kind of collective municipality – in the Mainz-Bingen district in Rhineland-Palatinate, Germany.

== Geography ==
Horrweiler lies in Rhenish Hesse between Mainz and Bad Kreuznach. It belongs to the Verbandsgemeinde of Sprendlingen-Gensingen, whose seat is in Sprendlingen.

== History ==
In the 12th century, Horrweiler was Salian, and then passed into Electorate of the Palatinate ownership and was annexed to the Amt of Stromberg as a subfief, with which it remained until the French Revolution. The tithes and patronage rights over the church were originally held by the Counts of Leiningen, who further conferred them upon members of the lower nobility. Owing to frequent conflicts, ever more mediation was needed. From 1518 to 1802, Saint Peter’s Monastery in Mainz held tithing rights in Horrweiler with the original right to place the local priest. In the wake of the Reformation, Saint Peter’s Monastery and the Reformed minister in Horrweiler ended up sharing the tithes (at 2/3 and 1/3 respectively). In pronouncements handed down in 1410 and 1552, Horrweiler was counted among the villages that had to bear the cost of maintaining Bingen’s town wall and defending it in wartime, for which the villagers enjoyed special rights in the town of Bingen. Rhenish Hesse was assigned to the French Department of Mont-Tonnerre (Donnersberg) in 1793. Horrweiler passed to the canton of Ober-Ingelheim. Under the terms of the Congress of Vienna, the area passed in 1816 to the Grand Duchy of Hesse and came to be known as Rheinhessen (Rhenish Hesse) to distinguish it from the state’s other regions, but also because it had its own special legal status, for example because of the lingering effects of the French Code civil. Rhenish Hesse’s days as part of Hesse ended with the onset of military occupation by the French in 1945 and with the founding of the state of Rhineland-Palatinate.

An important historical relic, besides the remnants of the old wall complexes built of elms, is the formerly fortified church, a Late Gothic hall structure with a quire enclosed on three sides and a ring of walls with what is perhaps also a Late Gothic, but Baroque-modified gatetower, which als serves as a belltower. Arising from municipal acts were the partial demolition of the wall and the total demolition of the defensive towers about 1840. The stones were used to build the schoolhouse.

== Politics ==
=== Municipal council ===
The council is made up of 13 council members, counting the part-time mayor, with seats apportioned thus:

	SPD	WG Horrweiler	Total
2004	7	5	12 seats

(as at municipal election held on 13 June 2004)

=== Coat of arms ===
The municipality’s arms might be described thus: Azure a cross bottonnée Or.

== Culture and sightseeing ==
=== Museums ===
At the Weindorfmuseum (“Wine Village Museum”), many exhibits can be seen that document this former life.

=== Music ===
The Horrweiler Trombone Choir (Posaunenchor Horrweiler) was founded in April 1927. Today it plays not only church music but secular as well. The Horrweiler Trombone Choir Promotional Association (Förderverein Posaunenchor Horrweiler e.V.) supports the choir financially and morally.

== Economy and infrastructure ==
=== Transport ===
- The municipality is crossed by the L 416 state road. The Autobahn A 61 runs right nearby, 2 km away.
- The municipality is linked to the local transport network by a bus route between Bingen and Bad Kreuznach.
