= Appelbach =

River in Germany

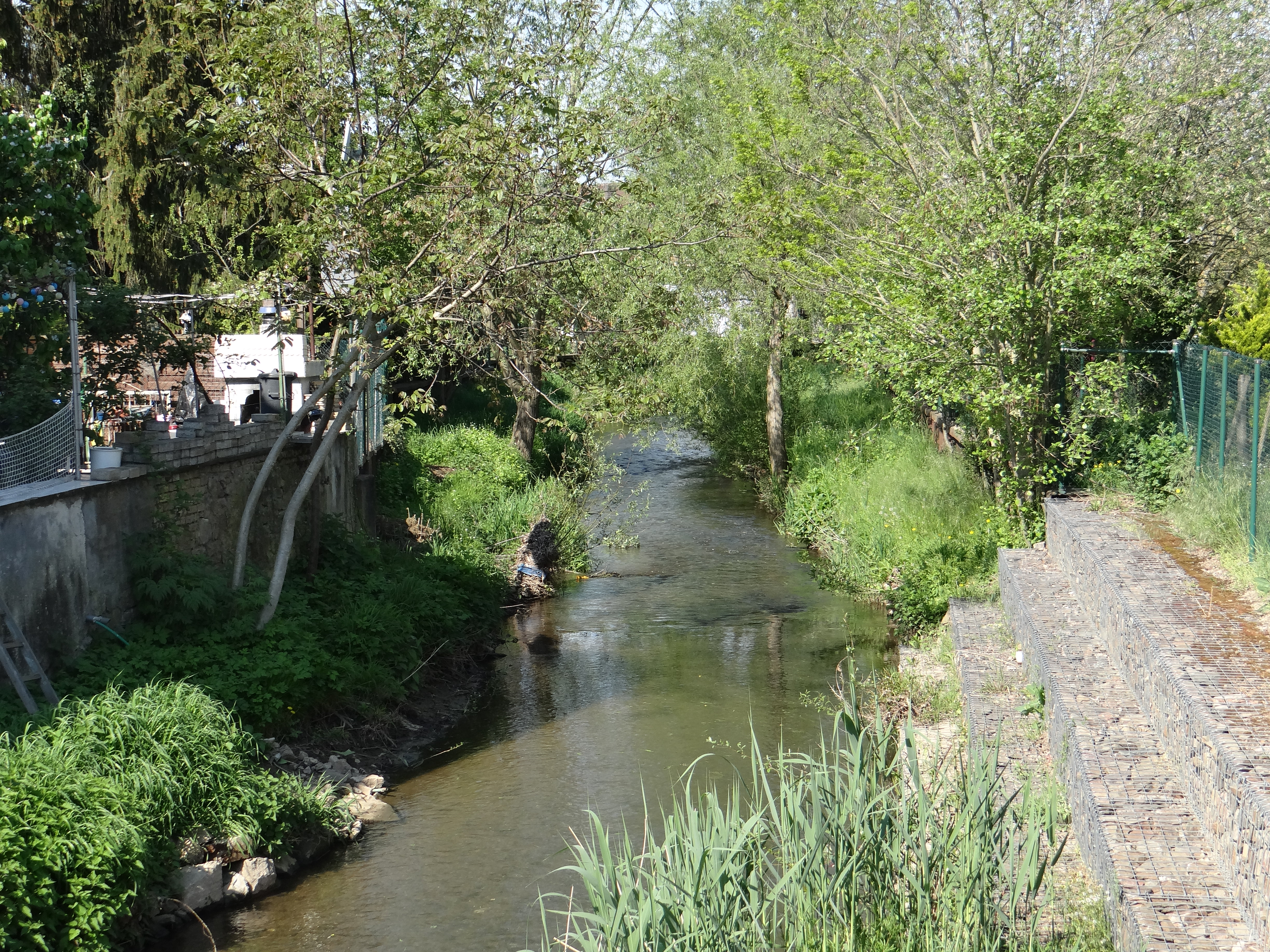
- The Appelbach in Planig

Location
- Country: Germany
- State: Rhineland-Palatinate

Physical characteristics
- Source
  - location: North of Falkenstein
  - coordinates: 49.6157°N 7.8815°E
- Mouth
  - location: At Bretzenheim into the Nahe
  - coordinates: 49.8744°N 7.9006°E

Basin features
- Progression: Nahe→ Rhine→ North Sea

Appelbach is a river of Rhineland-Palatinate, Germany. The river springs north of Falkenstein and discharges at Bretzenheim from the right into the Nahe.

== See also ==
- List of rivers of Rhineland-Palatinate
