= Worms–Bingen Stadt railway =

Railway line in Germany

Worms Hbf–Bingen (Rhein) Stadt railway
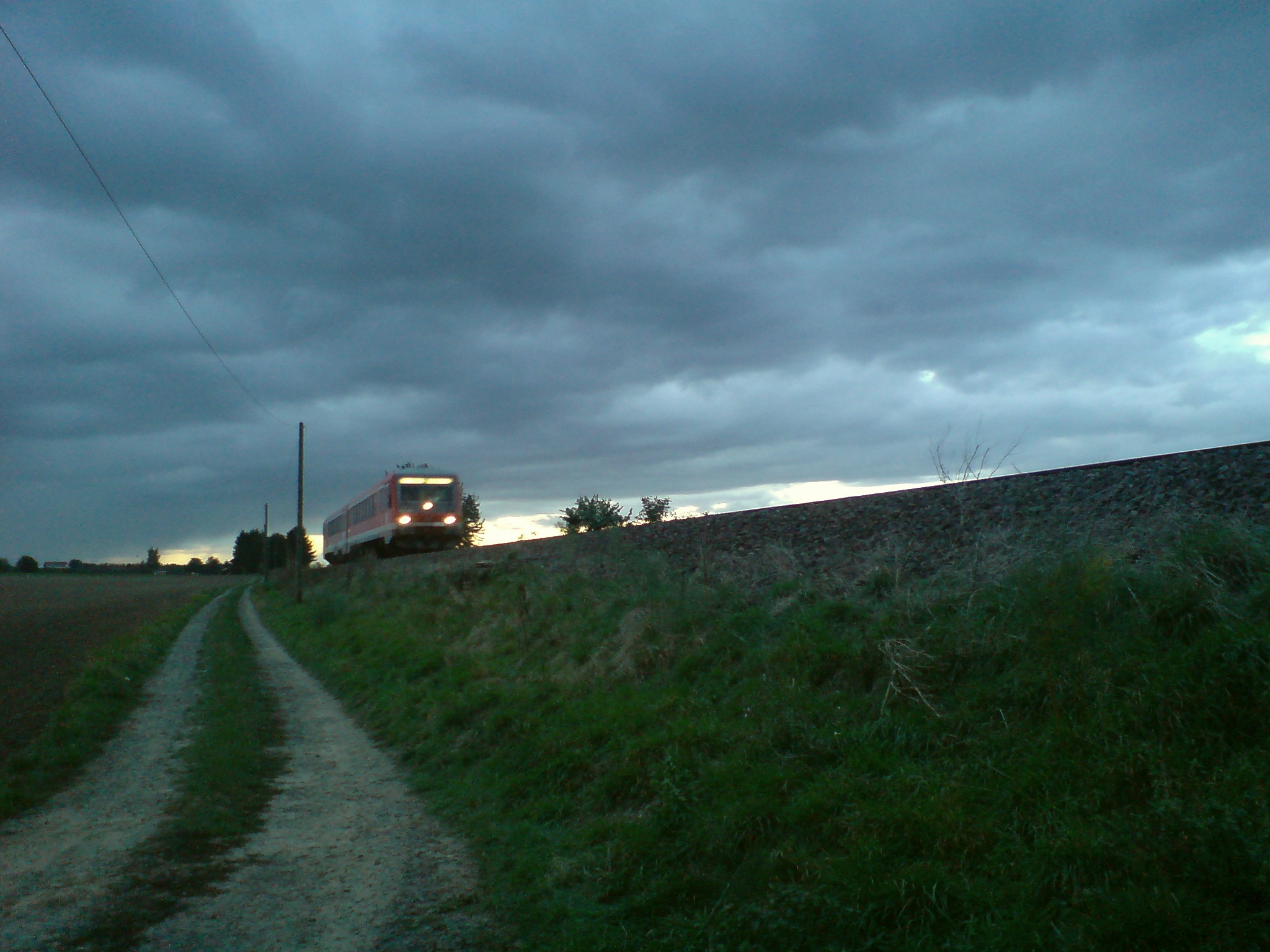
- Regionalbahn service near Monsheim running towards Worms

Overview
- Line number: 3512, 3560, 3569
- Locale: Rhineland-Palatinate, Germany

Service
- Route number: 662

Technical
- Line length: 62.9 km (39.1 mi)
- Track gauge: 1,435 mm (4 ft 8 1/2 in) standard gauge

The Worms–Bingen Stadt railway or Rheinhessenbahn (Rhenish Hesse railway) is a non-electrified line that links Worms via Alzey to Bingen Stadt in the German state of Rhineland-Palatinate.

== Route ==
The line is known as the Rheinhessenbahn because it runs over its entire length through the middle of the Rhineland-Palatinate region and former Grand Duchy of Hesse province of Rheinhessen (Rhenish Hesse). Services on the line are operated as timetable line 662. Between Worms and Gensingen-Horrweiler it has the line number of 3560, between Gensingen-Horrweiler and Büdesheim-Dromersheim junction it has the line number of 3512 (used for the Gau Algesheim–Bad Kreuznach railway), and between Büdesheim-Dromersheim and Bingen it has the line number of 3569. The line has both single and double-track sections.

== History ==
The line was opened in three different sections successively between 1864 and 1871 by the private Hessian Ludwig Railway (Hessische Ludwigsbahn, HLB). Along with the HLB, the line was nationalised on 1 April 1897 and became part of the Prussian-Hessian Railway Operation and Financial Association (German: Preußisch-Hessische Eisenbahnbetriebs- und Finanzgemeinschaft). This organisation later shared the fate of the Prussian state railways and was absorbed into the Deutsche Reichsbahn.

== Operation ==
The line is operated by Deutsche Bahn.

It is served by class 628/629 diesel multiple units, and occasionally by trains hauled by class 218 locomotives. Between Monsheim and Worms there is a service about every half-hour. Hourly services run from Bingen Stadt to Worms. The additional trains to Monsheim are hauled by class 218 locomotives and continue from Alzey to Mainz.

On Saturdays and Sundays the trains of Worms continue to Mannheim to combine with the RB44 between Worms and Mannheim to produce a 30-minute interval service.

Following the announcement of the new Southwest diesel network (Dieselnetzes Südwest) from December 2014, LINT rolling stock will be used on this line.

Verkehrsverbund Rhein-Neckar (Rhine-Neckar Transport Association, VRN) fares apply between Worms and Alzey and Rhein-Nahe-Nahverkehrsverbund (Rhine-Nahe Transport Association, RNN) fares apply between Worms and Bingen.

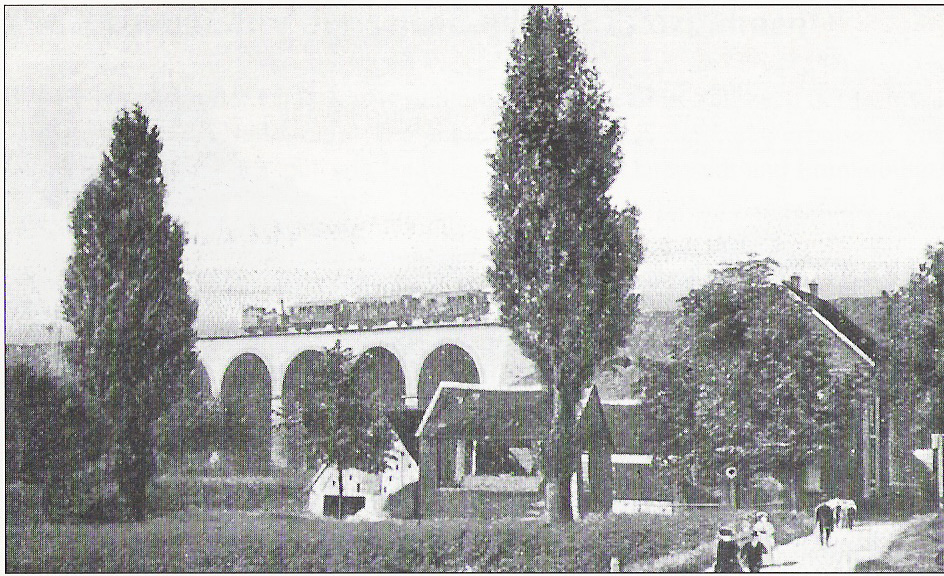
Rail bridge in Alzey in about 1900

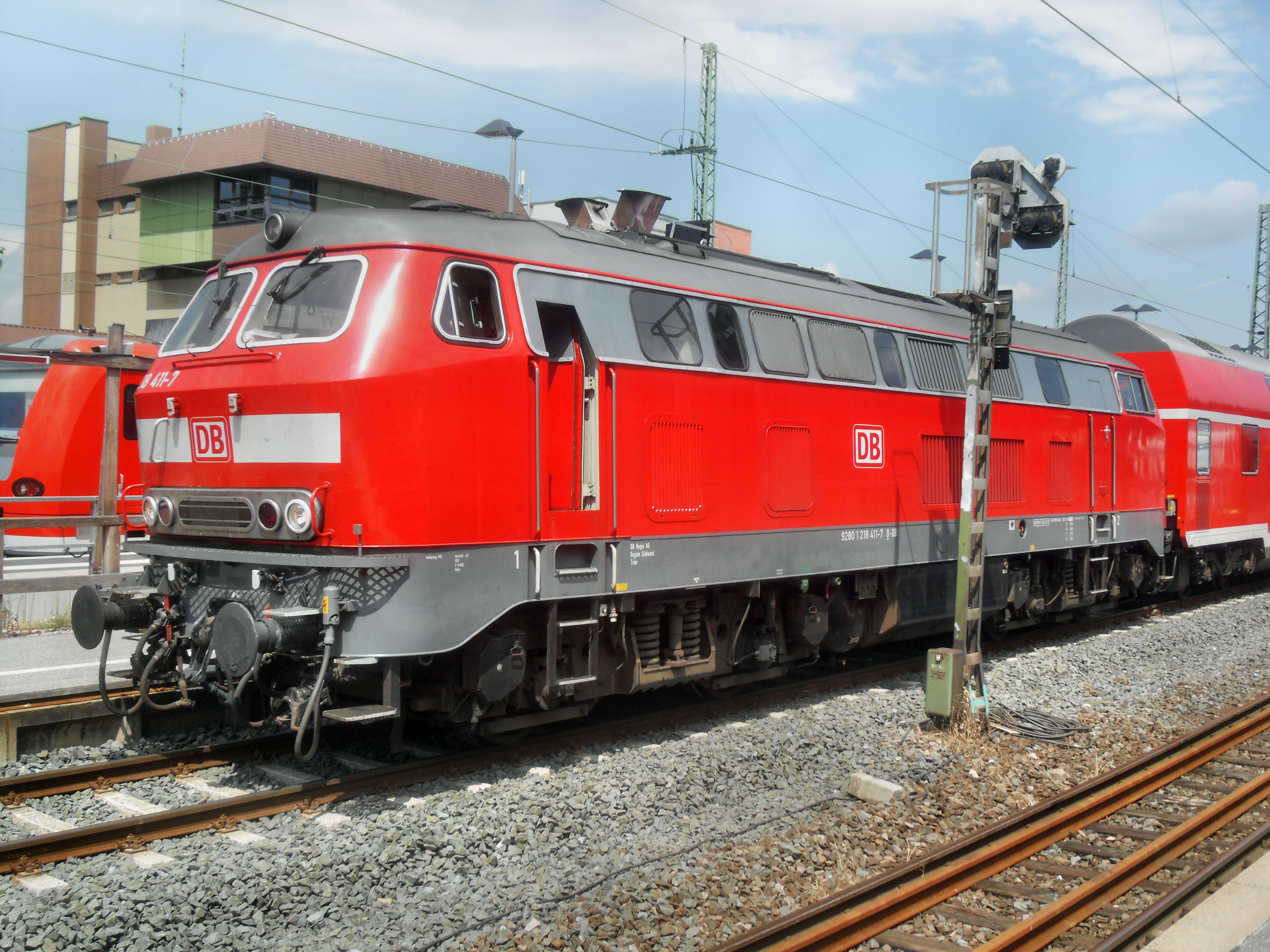
Regional-Express hauled by Diesel locomotive of class 218 in Worms on its way to Mainz

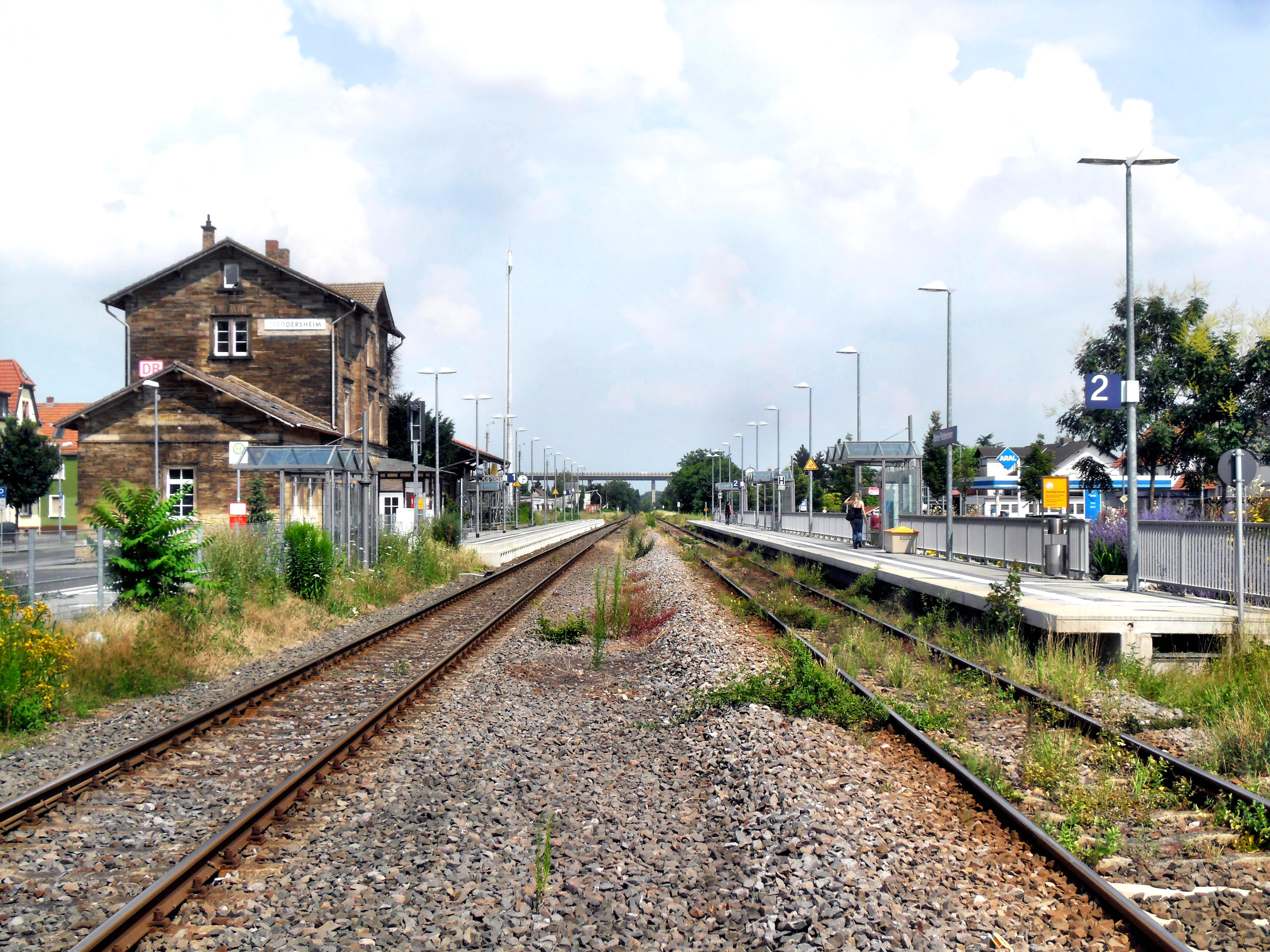
The Rheinhessen Railway in Pfeddersheim station
