= Zotzenheim =

- Municipality
- Coat of arms

- Location of Zotzenheim within Mainz-Bingen district
- Interactive map of Zotzenheim
- Location within Germany Location within Rhineland-Palatinate
- Coordinates: 49°52′27″N 07°58′08″E
- Country: Germany
- State: Rhineland-Palatinate
- District: Mainz-Bingen
- Municipal assoc.: Sprendlingen-Gensingen

Government
  - Mayor (2019–24): Alexander Strack

Area
  - Total: 3.18 km^{2} (1.23 sq mi)
- Elevation: 105 m (344 ft)

Population (2025-12-31)
  - Total: 634
  - Density: 199/km^{2} (516/sq mi)
- Time zone: UTC+01:00 (CET)
  - Summer (DST): UTC+02:00 (CEST)
- Postal codes: 55576
- Dialling codes: 06701
- Vehicle registration: MZ
- Website: www.sprendlingen-gensingen.de

Zotzenheim (German pronunciation: [ˈtsɔtsn̩haɪm]) is an Ortsgemeinde – a municipality belonging to a Verbandsgemeinde, a kind of collective municipality – in the Mainz-Bingen district in Rhineland-Palatinate, Germany.

== Geography ==
The municipality lies in Rhenish Hesse. It belongs to the Verbandsgemeinde of Sprendlingen-Gensingen, whose seat is in Sprendlingen.

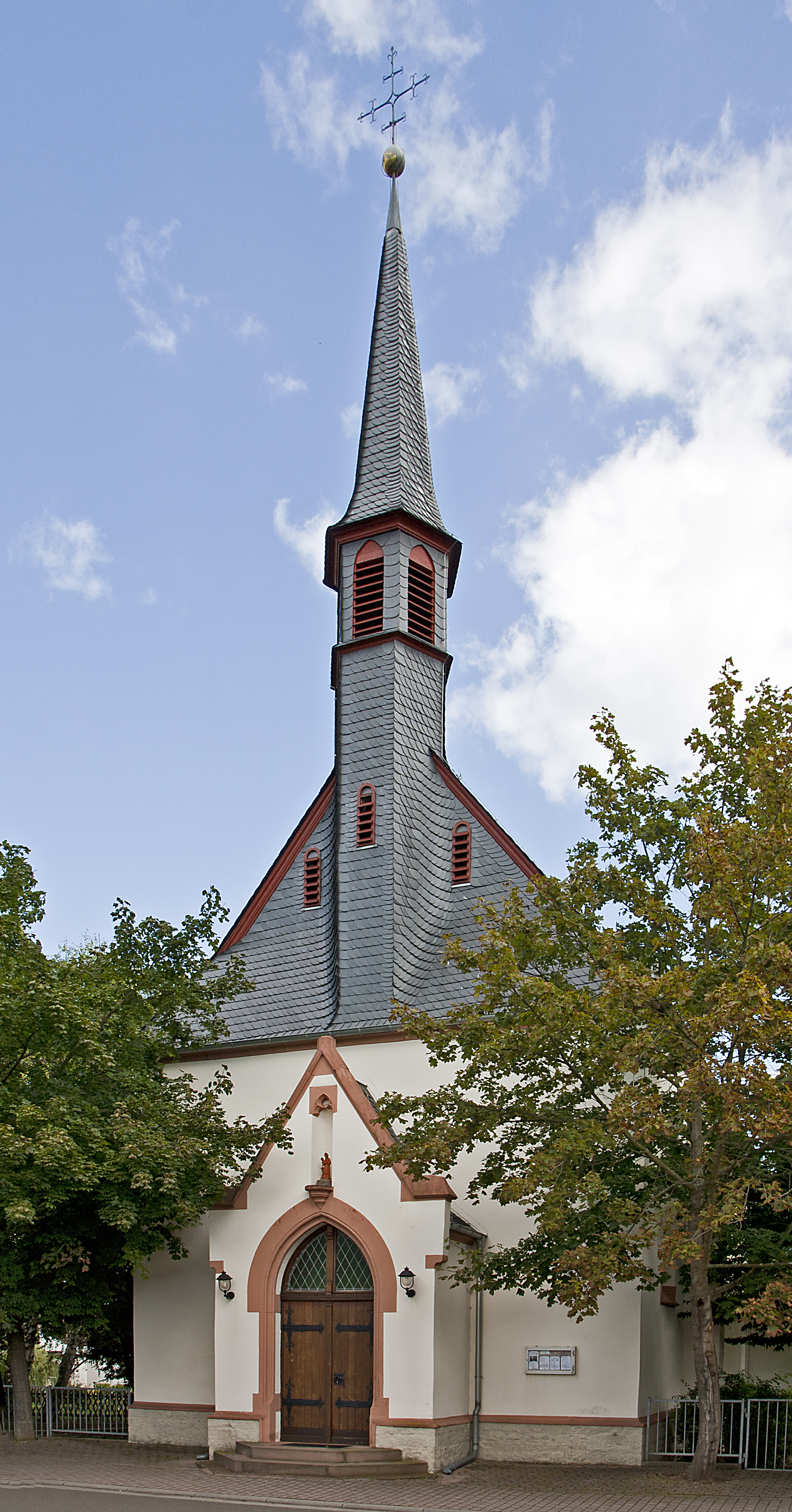
Zotzenheim St. Martin

== Culture and sightseeing ==
=== Sport ===
On Kreuznacher Straße is found a cinder team handball court and a clubhouse. HSG Zotzenheim/St. Johann/Sprendlingen is a successful team handball club that grew out of TV Zotzenheim 1901 (gymnastic club) and has already played several times in the third handball league.

=== Regular events ===
- On 1 May near the Napoleonshöhe mountain, or Gipfel des Horns, or in the local speech also “Hörnchen” (“Little Horn”), the so-called Fire Brigade Festival (Feuerwehrfest) takes place.
- In May on the weekend at Ascension Day, a folk festival for the region and beyond is held. In 2006, among others, the bands Paddy Goes To Holyhead, Dhalia's Lane, Galahad and WirrWarr appeared.
- On the second weekend in July, a fair is held in Zotzenheim with a wine tent, a few stands and a handball tournament.
- Zotzenheim is especially well known for the ZDF (Zotzenheimer Dorf-Fassenacht – the Carnival). Each year there are four “sessions” at the village community centre.

== Economy and infrastructure ==
=== Wineries ===
Zotzenheim is home to five major wineries:

- Weingut Werner Pitthan
- Weingut Philipp Schnell
- Weingut Siebenhof
- Weingut Scheffer
- Weingut Saulheimer

There are also several smaller wineries and those who do it as a hobby.

=== Other businesses ===
In the industrial park outside Zotzenheim on the street Am neuen Graben, several small businesses have set up shop, among them the Sand Barth shipping company.
