= Sprendlingen =

- Municipality
- Coat of arms

- Location of Sprendlingen within Mainz-Bingen district
- Interactive map of Sprendlingen
- Location within Germany Location within Rhineland-Palatinate
- Coordinates: 49°51′42″N 07°59′15″E
- Country: Germany
- State: Rhineland-Palatinate
- District: Mainz-Bingen
- Municipal assoc.: Sprendlingen-Gensingen

Government
  - Mayor (2019–24): Manfred Bucher

Area
  - Total: 13.03 km^{2} (5.03 sq mi)
- Elevation: 110 m (360 ft)

Population (2025-12-31)
  - Total: 3,961
  - Density: 304.0/km^{2} (787.3/sq mi)
- Time zone: UTC+01:00 (CET)
  - Summer (DST): UTC+02:00 (CEST)
- Postal codes: 55576
- Dialling codes: 06701
- Vehicle registration: MZ
- Website: www.sprendlingen.de

Sprendlingen (German pronunciation: [ˈʃpʁɛndlɪŋən]) is an Ortsgemeinde – a municipality belonging to a Verbandsgemeinde, a kind of collective municipality – in the Mainz-Bingen district in Rhineland-Palatinate, Germany.

== Geography ==
=== Location ===
Sprendlingen lies in Rhenish Hesse between Mainz and Bad Kreuznach on the Wiesbach. It is the seat of the Verbandsgemeinde of Sprendlingen-Gensingen.

=== Neighbouring municipalities ===
These are Badenheim, Pfaffen-Schwabenheim, Zotzenheim, Mainz-Bingen and Gau-Bickelheim.

== History ==
In 767, Sprendlingen had its first documentary mention in a record from the Lorsch Abbey. King Charles the Bald donated the village in 877 to the Monastery of Saint Gertrude at Nivelles in Brabant. In later times, the place ended up in the ownership of the County of Sponheim. In 1279 the archbishop of Mainz fought against the Count of Sponheim in the Battle of Sprendlingen. In 1707, Sprendlingen became a Badish holding and formed an Amt of the Margraviate of Baden.

In the late 18th century, Sprendlingen was conquered by the French and became part of the French First Republic. At the Congress of Vienna, Sprendlingen was awarded to Grand Duchy of Hesse.

== Politics ==
The council consists of 20 Sprendlingen Council members in the local elections on 7 June 2009 and the honorary mayor as chairman .

=== Coat of arms ===
The municipality's arms might be described thus: Gules a fess counter compony of seven azure and Or, in chief a mullet of six per fess and in base another per pale, both of the last.

The municipality's oldest known seal dates from the 15th century and yielded the current arms. The fess counter compony (that is, the horizontal stripe with a two-row chequered pattern) is the arms once borne by the Counts of Sponheim. The two mullets of six (six-pointed star shapes) were apparently added to distinguish the municipality's arms from the noble family's. Otherwise, their meaning is unknown.

=== Town partnerships ===
- Genlis, Côte-d'Or, France
- Longecourt-en-Plaine, Côte-d'Or, France

== Culture and sightseeing ==
Since 2004, there has been the Wißberghalle, a cultural and sport hall. Active in the community are two Carnival clubs and two theatre groups.

=== Buildings ===
There are a local history museum housed in an old timber-frame house and the old Town Hall on the marketplace. The Gertrudenviertel (neighbourhood) harbours many more older buildings. Caring for the Via Vinea, an adventure path through the vineyards, is the Sprendlingen Farmer's and Winegrower's Club.

=== Natural monuments ===
The Steinberg (also called Napoleonshöhe) is one of the fossil-bearing places in Rhenish Hesse with mammalian remnants that are some ten million years old from the Prehistoric Rhine's Deinotherium Sands, so called because they have so often yielded up fossil remains of the extinct proboscid Deinotherium.

=== Sport ===
In Sprendlingen there are several sport clubs, among them the successful team handball club HSG Zotzenheim/St.-Johann/Sprendlingen, TSG Sprendlingen 1861, the Sprendlingen Tennis Club, the Sprendlingen Karate Dojo and the Sprendlingen Dart Club. Facilities include a stadium, several sport halls, a tennis park, an outdoor swimming pool, a riding hall and signposted hiking trails through the region.

=== Music ===
There are a wind orchestra and a men's singing club.

== Economy and infrastructure ==
Sprendlingen is characterized by winegrowing, and as a midpoint community has a good retail infrastructure and several industrial employers such as the recreational vehicle manufacturer Eura Mobil and the building service provider K.H. Gaul.

=== Transport ===
Sprendlingen lies on the Rheinhessenbahn (railway) doing the Bingen–Alzey–Worms run. At the Sprendlingen (Rheinhessen) railway station there is hourly service by DB Regio AG Regionalbahn trains. Furthermore, Sprendlingen is served by Rhein-Nahe-Nahverkehrsverbund buses 650 and 657.

Sprendlingen lies right on Bundesstraße 50 between Bingen and Gau-Bickelheim. The Autobahn A 61 crosses the municipal area; The nearest interchange is Gau-Bickelheim.

=== Education ===
Sprendlingen has a communal kindergarten and two others, one each Catholic and Evangelical.

There are a primary school and an integrated comprehensive school in Sprendlingen, both of which also offer all-day daycare. Moreover, there is the Elisabethenschule, a special school, which likewise has all-day daycare.
