= Kümbdchen =

- Municipality
- Coat of arms

- Location of Kümbdchen within Rhein-Hunsrück-Kreis district
- Interactive map of Kümbdchen
- Location within Germany Location within Rhineland-Palatinate
- Coordinates: 49°59′29″N 7°30′38″E
- Country: Germany
- State: Rhineland-Palatinate
- District: Rhein-Hunsrück-Kreis
- Municipal assoc.: Simmern-Rheinböllen

Government
  - Mayor (2019–24): Günter Kunz

Area
  - Total: 3.21 km^{2} (1.24 sq mi)
- Elevation: 345 m (1,132 ft)

Population (2025-12-31)
  - Total: 487
  - Density: 152/km^{2} (393/sq mi)
- Time zone: UTC+01:00 (CET)
  - Summer (DST): UTC+02:00 (CEST)
- Postal codes: 55471
- Dialling codes: 06761
- Vehicle registration: SIM
- Website: www.kuembdchen.de

Kümbdchen is an Ortsgemeinde – a municipality belonging to a Verbandsgemeinde, a kind of collective municipality – in the Rhein-Hunsrück-Kreis (district) in Rhineland-Palatinate, Germany. It belongs to the Verbandsgemeinde Simmern-Rheinböllen, whose seat is in Simmern.

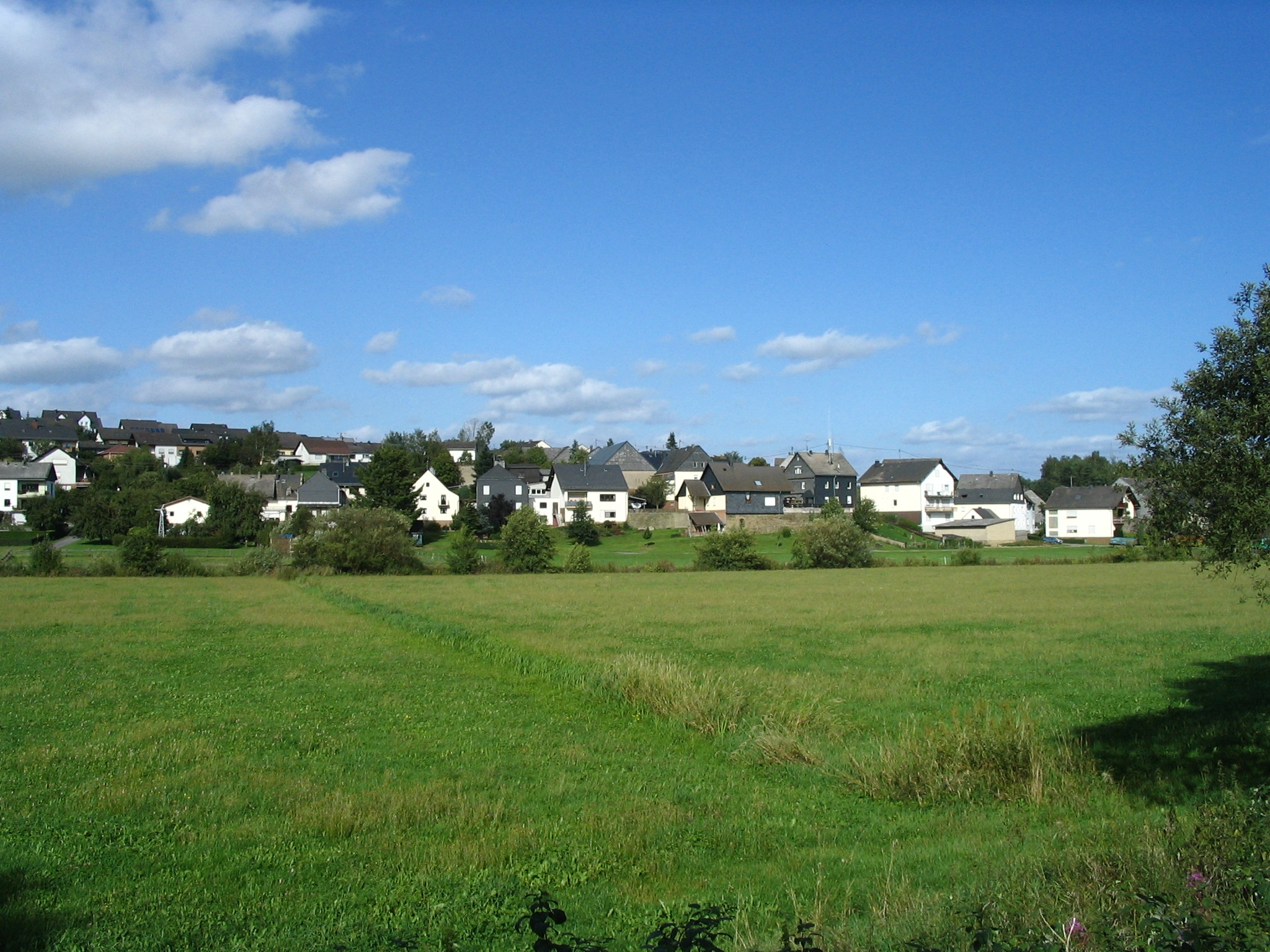
Kümbdchen seen from the west, photographed from the Schinderhannes Cycle Path

== Geography ==
=== Location ===
The municipality lies in the Hunsrück on the west slope of the Külzbach valley and in the Kondbach valley. Within municipal limits, the Kondbach empties into the Külzbach. Kümbdchen lies well within a kilometre of both Simmern and Keidelheim. Rheinböllen lies roughly 12 km to the east, while another 8 km beyond, the Rhine flows by Bacharach. Kümbdchen currently has somewhat more than 500 inhabitants. The municipal area measures 362 ha, of which 330 ha is given over to agriculture while the other 32 ha is wooded.

== History ==
Kümbdchen is among the Hunsrück's oldest villages. In the countryside around Kümbdchen, there have been both Roman and Stone Age finds. As early as Roman times, two rural settlements are known to have been here. Over the last one thousand and more years, Kümbdchen's history has been tightly bound to the town of Simmern.

In 1072, Kümbdchen had its first documentary mention. Kümbdchen belonged to the old mother church in Simmern and later passed along with Simmern to the Raugraves at the Altenbaumburg (castle, now in ruins, in today's Ortsgemeinde of Altenbamberg near Bad Kreuznach), in whose ownership it remained until they sold the town of Simmern to the Counts Palatine in 1359.

In the Raugraves’ time, Kümbdchen was known as Endilskomede and was mentioned several times under this name. The inhabitants were “outer townsmen” (Außenbürger in German) of Simmern, putting them under the town council and court. The spelling of the village's name was quite variable over time. Endilskomede eventually became Chumbd über dem Berge (the last three words mean “above the mountain”), and as late as the 18th century it was still Cümbgen über Berg, and then Chümbdchen, and finally, beginning in 1920, Kümbdchen.

In 1368, there erupted disputes between the landholders in Kümbdchen as to who was lord of what. A legal investigation was undertaken in Simmern, which was attended by, among others, the Schultheiß, the Schöffen (roughly “lay jurists”) and the municipality of Simmern. Here, it was sworn under oath that Endilskomede had long been Raugravial domain and that all inhabitants of Endilskomede had to go to Simmern to attend court. In 1555, serfdom was abolished in both Kümbdchen and Simmern. In 1557, the Reformation was introduced. The worldly lordship, though, was the same as ever: from 1359 to 1793, there was the Electorate of the Palatinate rule, between 1793 and 1814 it was the French, and thereafter the Prussians.

As a constituent community (Stadtteil) of Simmern, Kümbdchen had an elected representative on town council. It can clearly be seen that the old Hunsrück farming families lasted quite a long time. Names that cropped up a hundred or more years ago are still found now, such as Frank, Konrad, Jungherz, Berg, Schmitt and Schüler. In 1823, the Schöffen Jungherz and Peter Weyrich from Kümbdchen submitted a petition to Simmern town council for Kümbdchen to become a municipality in its own right. The request was denied several times by both the town and the government in Koblenz. On 14 April 1862, there was a separation agreement that determined ownership of various properties that had been in contention. Kümbdchen got the schoolhouse, a herdsman's house, a fire pump with 200 fire pails and all lands as specified on an attached map. Kümbdchen elected its own council for the first time on 1 October 1862, and finally became a municipality in its own right on 1 January 1863. It has been an autonomous entity since this time, although ecclesiastically, it is still tied to Simmern.

Beginning in 1794, Kümbdchen lay under French rule. In 1815 it was assigned to the Kingdom of Prussia at the Congress of Vienna. Since 1946, it has been part of the then newly founded state of Rhineland-Palatinate.

== Politics ==
=== Municipal council ===
The council is made up of 12 council members, who were elected by majority vote at the municipal election held on 7 June 2009, and the honorary mayor as chairman.

=== Mayor ===
Kümbdchen's mayor is Günter Kunz.

=== Coat of arms ===
The municipality's arms might be described thus: Per pale chequy of twenty-four Or and azure and vert a bend wavy argent, on a chief sable a lion passant of the first armed, langued and crowned gules.

The charge on the chief is the Palatine Lion, recalling Kümbdchen's former status as a part of Simmern, whose arms bear this same charge in the same tinctures and attitude. The gold and blue “chequy” field on the dexter (armsbearer's right, viewer's left) side refers to the “Further” County of Sponheim, under whose authority Kümbdchen once lay. The municipality's mainly agricultural structure finds expression in the green field on the sinister (armsbearer's left, viewer's right) side. The silver “bend wavy” with which this is charged symbolizes a brook and refers to Kümbdchen's origins. The brook Kond rises near the old Kumbd Convent and flows through Kumbd and Niederkumbd to Kümbdchen, where it empties into the Külzbach.

The village square in Kümbdchen, which was dedicated in 1992, is laid out with similar symbolism to what is seen in the municipality's arms.

== Culture and sightseeing ==
=== Buildings ===
The following are listed buildings or sites in Rhineland-Palatinate’s Directory of Cultural Monuments:

- Külztalstraße 32 – estate complex, whole complex of buildings; timber-frame house, partly plastered or slated, mid 19th century, timber-frame stable-barn, latter half of the 19th century

=== Sport and leisure ===
Cyclists, hikers and inline skaters can use the Schinderhannes-Radweg (cycle path), which runs right through the municipal area.

== Economy and infrastructure ==
Once there were 33 agricultural operations in the municipality, but this has now dwindled to one operation that treats farming as its main business and a handful of others who work the land as a sideline.

The village itself has 12 streets, a community centre, a fire station, a kindergarten and a gymnasium. Four new building zones have been laid out over the years: “In der Au” (1962),“Gartenstrasse” (1973), “Im Gieren” (1979) and “Am Külzer Pfad” (1996, in three sections).
