= Keidelheim =

- Municipality
- Coat of arms

- Location of Keidelheim within Rhein-Hunsrück-Kreis district
- Interactive map of Keidelheim
- Location within Germany Location within Rhineland-Palatinate
- Coordinates: 49°59′28″N 7°29′58″E
- Country: Germany
- State: Rhineland-Palatinate
- District: Rhein-Hunsrück-Kreis
- Municipal assoc.: Simmern-Rheinböllen

Government
  - Mayor (2019–24): Karsten Krämer

Area
  - Total: 2.72 km^{2} (1.05 sq mi)
- Elevation: 320 m (1,050 ft)

Population (2025-12-31)
  - Total: 339
  - Density: 125/km^{2} (323/sq mi)
- Time zone: UTC+01:00 (CET)
  - Summer (DST): UTC+02:00 (CEST)
- Postal codes: 55471
- Dialling codes: 06761
- Vehicle registration: SIM
- Website: www.keidelheim.de

Keidelheim (German pronunciation: [ˈkaɪdl̩haɪm]) is an Ortsgemeinde – a municipality belonging to a Verbandsgemeinde, a kind of collective municipality – in the Rhein-Hunsrück-Kreis (district) in Rhineland-Palatinate, Germany. It belongs to the Verbandsgemeinde Simmern-Rheinböllen, whose seat is in Simmern.

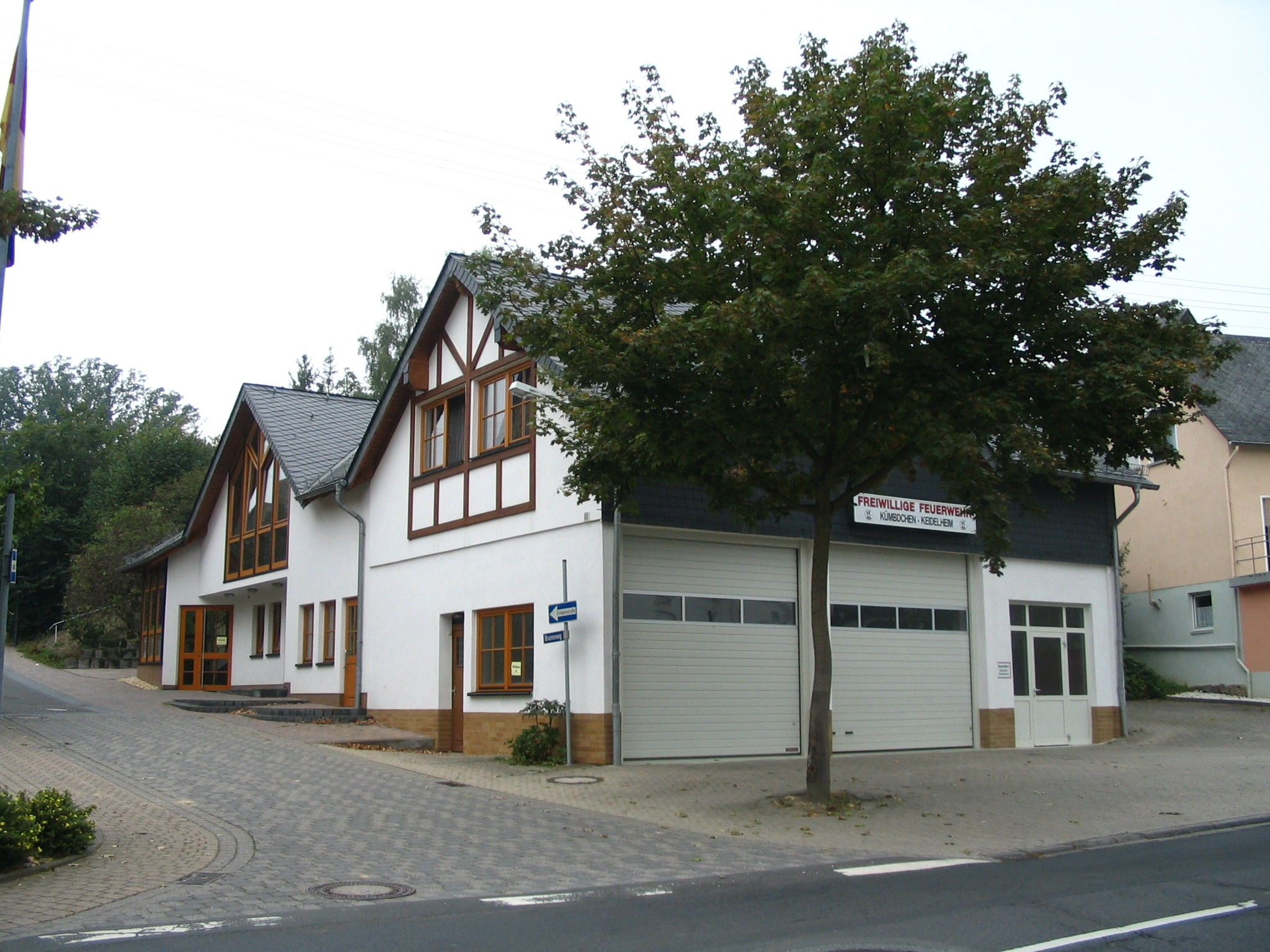
Multipurpose building

== Geography ==
=== Location ===
The municipality lies in the middle of the Hunsrück between Simmern and Kastellaun, right on the Schinderhannes-Radweg (cycle path) at a mean elevation of 320 m above sea level. The Külzbach marks the boundary between Keidelheim and the neighbouring village of Kümbdchen.

== History ==
Sometime between 1330 and 1335, Keidelheim (then Kudelnheim) was first mentioned in a document in the taxation register kept by the Count of Sponheim. The register listed a whole series of taxes and other comital levies, among which were the soul tax, the head tax and tithes.

Another compilation of taxes from about 1400 lists for the first time the village's inhabitants (it was then called Kudillenheim). The monasterial lordship over Keidelheim ended in 1566 with the dissolution of the Ravengiersburg Augustinian Canonical Foundation. The Duchy of Simmern passed as an Oberamt to the Electorate of the Palatinate. Over the next 120 years, the countryside was heavily stricken with many wars, bad harvests and sicknesses. The villages of Nannhausen, Fronhofen, Biebern, Reich, Wüschheim, Eichkülz and Keidelheim together formed a Schultheißerei. In 1683, Michel Huth from Keidelheim was the Schultheiß.

On 19 October 1794, French troops marched into Simmern, ending the Electorate of the Palatinate rule. Patrimonial hierarchy (Erbuntertänigkeit – an arrangement similar to serfdom, but without the lord's actual ownership of the subjects), with its compulsory labour for the enfeoffed lord and its tithes was then abolished, but new compulsory labour for the French army weighed even more heavily on the people. The official cession of the Rhine’s left bank to France in 1797 led to administrative restructuring. The nobility lost their holdings, churches and monasteries were expropriated and estates could be acquired by those who had hitherto been their tenants. Keidelheim was grouped with 12 other municipalities into the Mairie (“Mayoralty”) of Simmern in the Canton of Simmern, thereby making it part of the Department of Rhin-et-Moselle, whose seat was at Koblenz. As French citizens, young men were then required to do military service. With Napoleon's defeat in Russia began a time in which Austrians, Russians, Bavarians and Prussians quartered themselves locally and imposed more compulsory labour on the people. At first, the area was governed by an Austrian-Bavarian administration commission. In an 1813 statistical publication, the following figures were noted for Keidelheim: 114 souls, 25 houses and 25 windows.

On 28 May 1815, the Prussians took over the lands on the Rhine's left bank, and from the French arrondissement of Simmern arose the district (Kreis) of Simmern. The municipality of Keidelheim passed to the Bürgermeisterei (“Mayoralty”) of Simmern, and is still part of that – in its newer incarnation as a Verbandsgemeinde – even now. Despite progressive Prussian measures in agriculture and road building, bad harvests and a sharp rise in population led to gradual impoverishment. The municipalities had to take measures to save the inhabitants from going hungry. Many citizens emigrated to the United States.

After 1900, an economic upswing took hold, which nevertheless took a sharp blow with the outbreak of the First World War in 1914. When the war ended in 1918, the Rhine's left bank was once more occupied by the French. There followed hard times with currency values swiftly falling. In 1913, an American dollar was equal to 4.20 marks, but by 1918, it was equal to 6 marks. In September 1923, the rate had become one dollar to 98,200,000 marks, and a mere two months later, this had become 4,200,000,000,000 marks to the dollar.

The Third Reich brought along with it ideological change and also altered municipal politics, with Keidelheim being no different in this respect to any other place in Germany. Keidelheim and Kümbdchen together formed all the local Nazi Party groups for which Nazi Germany came to be known. The Second World War brought the Nazis’ activities to an end. On 15 March 1945, the Americans took Simmern, and the next day, they came to Keidelheim. The village was occupied, and the inhabitants were ordered to vacate their houses. On 10 July 1945, history repeated itself yet again when the French relieved the Americans. The local farmers were burdened time and again by newly assigned requirements, contributions and requisitions. The harsh winter of 1946-1947 and the summertime drought that followed once again brought the French zone of occupation dangerously close to famine. In late 1945, trade unions and political parties were once again allowed in the three Western zones. The first municipal election was held on 15 September 1946. With currency reform and an unexpectedly good harvest in 1948, as well as help from the Marshall Plan, things began to turn round.

In the 1950s, structural change began in agriculture, leading to the Kümbdchen-Keidelheim Flurbereinigung. From 1961 to 1963, the village saw the construction of new watermains and sewers. At roughly the same time, the Kümbdchen-Keidelheim school board built the new school. In 1967, the municipal council refused a proposal to amalgamate Kümbdchen and Keidelheim into one municipality. Under the last administrative reforms on 7 July 1969, the district of Simmern was dissolved and merged with parts of the Sankt Goar and Zell districts into the new Rhein-Hunsrück-Kreis. In 1972 began the “Im Schneebäcker” building development.

== Politics ==
=== Municipal council ===
The council is made up of 8 council members, who were elected by majority vote at the municipal election held on 7 June 2009, and the honorary mayor as chairman.

=== Mayor ===
Keidelheim's mayor is Karsten Krämer.

=== Coat of arms ===
The municipality's arms might be described thus: Per fess sable a crown Or and argent on ground vert an oaktree of the same.

== Culture and sightseeing ==
=== Buildings ===
The following are listed buildings or sites in Rhineland-Palatinate’s Directory of Cultural Monuments:

- Hauptstraße/corner of Brunnenweg – cast-iron fountain basin, Rheinböllen Ironworks, latter half of the 19th century

=== Natural monuments ===
Keidelheim is home to three notable oak trees. The Assmannseiche is named for the house on whose lot it originally stood (Assmann was the family’s name, and eiche means “oak” in German). It is believed to have been planted in 1780. The tree's height is 25 m, its circumference at chest height is 370 cm and its crown has a diameter of 30 m. The Bismarckeiche was planted in 1890 in the then Imperial Chancellor's honour. The tree's height is 21 m, its circumference at chest height is 295 cm and its crown has a diameter of 22 m. The Keidelheimer Dorfeiche (“Village Oak”) or Wappeneiche (“Heraldic Oak”) stands as a charge in the municipality's coat of arms. It is found in a meadow just before the forest on the way out of the village to the barbecue pits. If the village chronicle is to be believed, it is more than one thousand years old. Since the oak stands in a spot that was once a much broader expanse of meadowland, it is assumed that it was once used as a sheltering tree. The tree's height is 21 m, its circumference at chest height is 500 cm and its crown has a diameter of 23 m. All three of these trees are protected as natural monuments.

Keidelheim also has a notable beech tree standing on a slope before the former level crossing on the road to Simmern. French prisoners of war used the tree as their morning meeting place during the Second World War and carved their names in it, as did local youths in the years after the war.

=== Sport and leisure ===
Cyclists, hikers and skaters have the Schinderhannes-Radweg (cycle path) at their disposal running along the old Hunsrückbahn (railway) right-of-way.
