= Frei-Laubersheim fibula =

Archeological finding

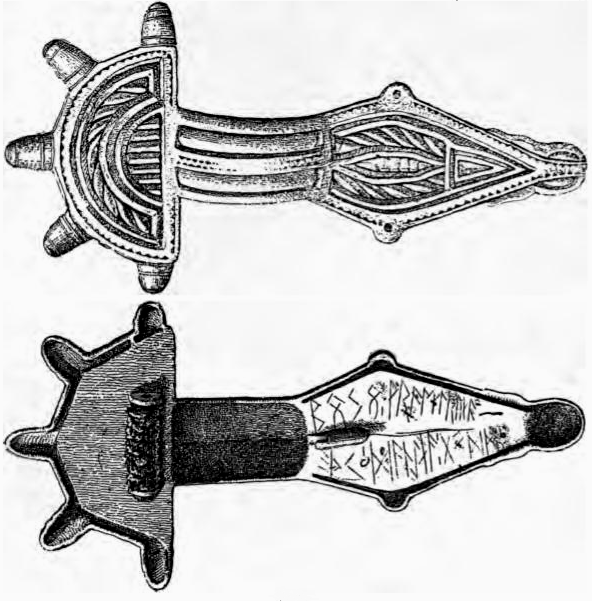
The Frei-Laubersheim fibula.

The Frei-Laubersheim fibula is a silver-gilt bow-style fibula found in Frei-Laubersheim, Bad Kreuznach (Rhineland-Palatinate) in 1872. The grave in which it was found, dates to approximately the 6th century. It was that of a presumably Frankish woman. The fibula is one of a pair, and bears a runic inscription in the Elder Futhark.

== Inscription ==
The fibula bears a runic inscription divided into two lines, with some of the individual words separated by punctuating colons. The final characters of both lines are largely illegible due to normal wear caused by securing the now-missing pin under the catch plate. As a result, the inscription has been interpreted in various ways. The first line clearly reads:

ᛒᛟᛋᛟ ᛬ ᚹᚱᚨᛖᛏ {} ᚱᚢᚾᚨ
boso : wraet (:) runa

The first word, boso, represents a man's name found in Old High German (Poso, Buoso or Buaso), Old English (Bōsa) and Old Norse (Bōsi). Since boso also appears in dithematic names such as Bosogast and Bosochind, boso in the inscription may be a shortened form of a longer name. It could also be connected with Bosenheim (Bad Kreuznach), a small town located a few miles to the north of Frei-Laubersheim which is believed to have taken its name from the Boso clan which settled there in the middle of the 5th century. The second word, wraet, is understood as a dialectal variant of West Germanic *wrait, the 3rd person singular past form of the verb *wrītan (to engrave, write), a term regularly appearing in runic inscriptions to describe the practice of carving or engraving runes. By the time of attestation, this *ai had undergone monophthongization in most West Germanic dialects: Old Saxon wrêt, Old Frisian wrêt, Old English wrât, but Old High German reiz. The ae in wraet may represent a transitional stage between the diphthong *ai and the long vowel which was to replace it, which may indicate a Low German origin for the inscription. The third word, runa, is either the accusative plural or singular collective form of the word 'rune'. Thus, the first part of the inscription reads "Boso wrote (the) runes".

The second line of the inscription is more difficult to interpret. It reads:

ᚦᚲ ᛫ ᛞᚨᚦᛇᚾᚨ ᛬ ᚷᛟᛚᛁᛞᚨ
þ(i)k (:) {daþïna (dalïna?)} : {golida (godda?)}

The first word, þ(i)k, is generally interpreted as the West Germanic form of the second person singular accusative pronoun *þik from an earlier Common Germanic *þek '(to) you'. Alternative interpretations include þo 'then' and ik 'I'. The second word, daþïna or dalïna, is understood to be a woman's name, possibly either an early attestation of the modern name Tedina or a feminine form of the well-attested Old High German masculine name Tallo. The appearance of the rune ᛇ (ï) in the name is significant in that it is one of only three verified attestations of the use of the rune in the south Germanic area, the others being contained in the inscription on the Pforzen buckle and in the so-called Breza fuþark. The last word has proven to be the most difficult to interpret. It is apparently a finite verb inflected in the past third person singular, though the stem remains entirely uncertain, as does the subject of the verb. Suggestions include golda or golida 'greeted', godda 'gave', and goida 'spoke'. Accordingly, the second line of the inscription has been variously interpreted as reading "Daþina greeted you", "(He) greeted you, Daþïna", "I, Daþina, spoke [the charm]", "Then Dalena spoke [the charm]", or "To you, Dalena, (he) gave [presents]".

== Heraldry ==
Frei-Laubersheim's coat of arms

The Frei-Laubersheim fibula appears as a charge in Frei-Laubersheim's municipal coat of arms. It occupies the field in base (the lower section) on an escutcheon that is tierced in mantle (divided into three in a somewhat "coatlike" pattern).

== See also ==
- Nordendorf fibulae
- Pforzen buckle
