= Raugraves =

German noble family

Arms of the Raugraves

Arms of a lateral branch of the Raugraves

The Raugraves were a German noble family, which had its center of influence in the former Nahegau. They descended from the Emichones (Counts of Nahegau).

== History ==
=== First family in the 12th until 15th centuries ===
The family of the Raugraves (the "Rough Counts") were descended from a division of the Wildgraves (the "Wild Counts") around 1148 (heirs of the Emichones). The first Raugrave was Emich I (ca. 1128-1172), second son of the Wildgrave Emich VI and brother of Wildgrave Konrad. Perhaps on account of the rough and mountainous quality of his lordships Emich named himself Raugrave (German: Raugraf; Latin: comes hirsutus; with the first part of the term "Rau" meaning "raw," undeveloped land plus the common Germanic title -graf, with a similar connotation to Wildgrave -Waldgraf - a ruler over a "wild," - Wald, forest - densely wooded area). The second line originated from a first heritage division of the county in Nahegau in 1113 was that of the Counts of Veldenz. The family seat (Stammburg) of the Raugraves was the Baumburg near the present-day village of Altenbamberg south of Bad Münster am Stein, which was built before 1146.

The sons of Raugrave Emich II divided his possessions, thus establishing the Stolzenberger and Baumburger lines. In 1253 the New Baumburg (Neubamberg) rose as the seat of a further line and the Stolzenberg line died out with Raugrave Wilhelm in 1358. In the same year disagreements in arms took place about the Stolzenburg. The lords of Bolanden inherited the lands of the extinct Stolzenberg line and sold Simmern to the Electorate of the Palatinate in 1359. In 1385 the Altenbaumburg line died out and in 1457 the last member of the Neuenbaumburg line died. Most of the estate went to the Electorate of the Palatinate.

=== Second family in the 17th century ===
When the Raugrave possessions passed to the Electorate of the Palatinate, the Raugrave title was taken over by Charles I Louis, Elector Palatine who purchased the estates. In 1667 it fell to the children of the Elector's second marriage. In 1658 the Elector contracted a morganatic, arguably bigamous (cf. Cuius regio, eius religio) second marriage at Frankenthal to Baroness Luise von Degenfeld. From 31 December 1667, the Elector accorded Luise the title of "the Raugravine" (Raugräfin), and the corresponding titles of Raugrave/Raugravine (Raugraf/Raugräfin), without territorial suffix, to each of her children, distinguishing them from his first, dynastic family; the Electress (née Landgravine Charlotte of Hesse-Kassel, who always refused to acknowledge divorce from her husband, and her children, the future Elector Palatine Charles II and the future Duchess of Orleans, Elisabeth Charlotte. Thirteen children were born to the Elector and the Raugravine between October 1658 and April 1675, and she died in the castle of Friedrichsburg in Mannheim on 28 March 1677.

On 26 February 1677, Charles I Louis invested his two elder sons by Luise von Degenfeld, the Raugraves Karl-Ludwig and Karl-Eduard, with the lordship of Stebbach in Kraichgau. A portion of this estate had belonged in fief to the von Gemmingen family since 1577 and when it came in its entirety to the Elector Palatine in 1677 under the administration of the city of Hilsbach, he transferred his rights therein to the two raugraves.

Charles I died in 1680, followed by his son and heir by his first wife, Charles II, in 1685. The new Elector Palatine Philip William of Neuburg, a distant, Catholic relative, seized Stebbach upon Karl-Eduard's death in 1690. But in addition to several living daughters, Charles I still had a living son of his second marriage, Raugrave Karl-Moritz. Thanks to the protests of his maternal uncle, Baron Ferdinand von Degenfeld, the estate was deeded over to Karl-Moritz, the last raugrave, on 27 September 1695.

Stebbach was again seized by the Elector Palatine upon the latter's death in 1702. A successful appeal against this act was made, this time on behalf of the two surviving daughters of Charles I and Luise von Degenfeld, the Raugravines Luise (1661-1733) and Amalia (1663-1709), the former of whom managed the estates of her brother-in-law, the renowned general, Meinhard, 3rd Duc de Schomberg, 1st Duke of Leinster. When Luise died her niece, Lady Maria von Schomberg (1692-1762), who had married her mother's cousin, Count Christopher von Degenfeld-Schonberg (1689-1762), inherited Stebbach. The estate remained henceforth among the properties of the Degenfeld-Schonberg counts, even after the town's merger with Gemmingen in 1974.

== Property ==
The main properties of the Raugraves lie south of the Nahe in the Alsenz, south of Kirn, where the seat of the Becherbach, near Alzey, where they were seneschals of the Palatine counts, as well as in Simmern. Their castles were the Altenbaumburg, the Ebernburg, the Stolzenburg, the Naumburg, the Neu Baumburg (new Baumburg) and a castle in Simmern/Hunsrück.

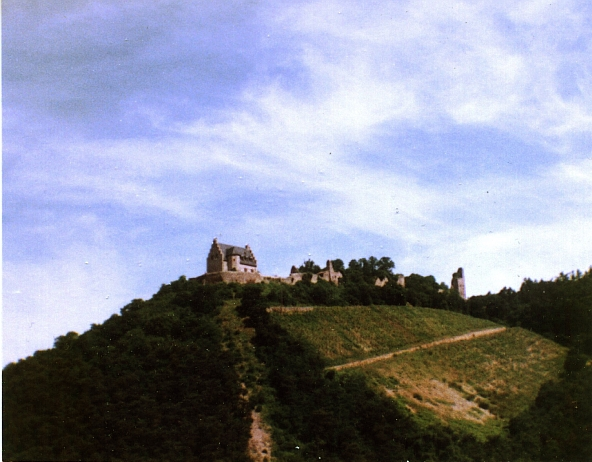
Altenbaumburg

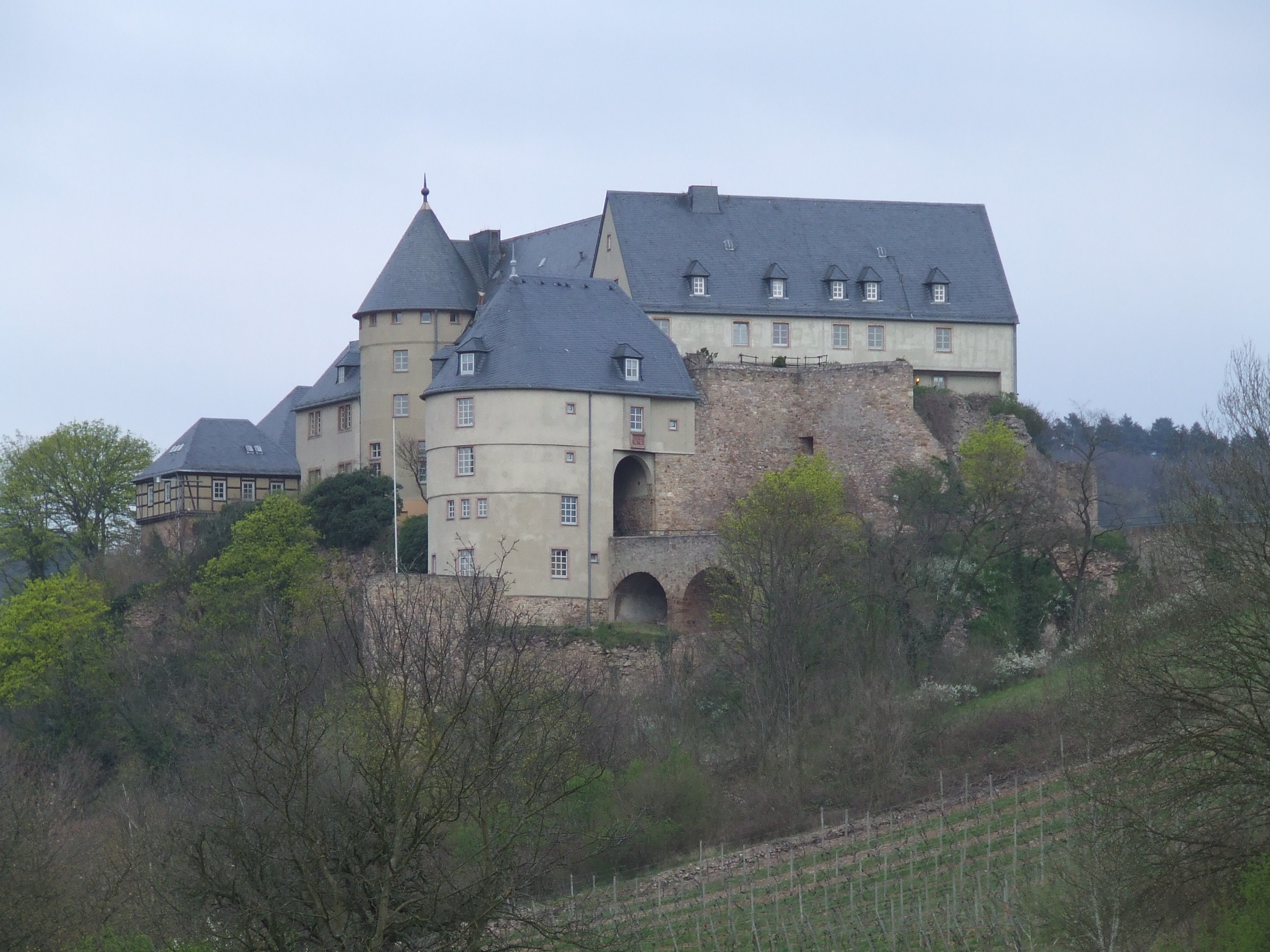
Ebernburg

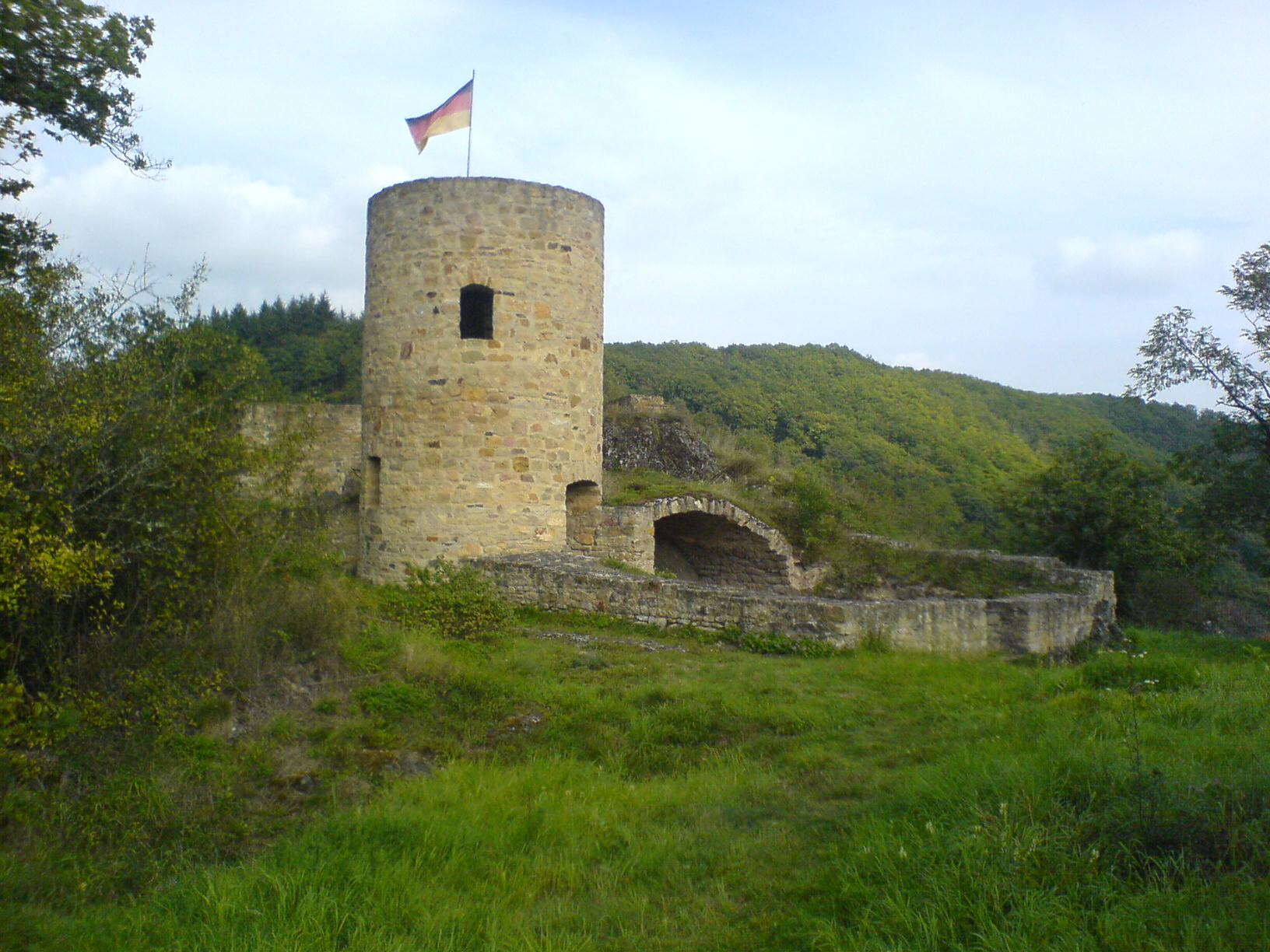
Naumburg

== Coat of arms ==
The stem arms (Stammwappen) of the Raugraves were vertically divided red and gold.

== Literature ==
- (in German) Dotzauer, Winfried: Geschichte des Nahe-Hunsrück-Raumes von den Anfängen bis zur Französischen Revolution; Stuttgart: Steiner, 2001, ISBN 3-515-07878-9 (online at Google Books)
- (in German) Fabricius, Wilhelm: Die Herrschaften des unteren Nahegebietes. Der Nahegau und seine Umgebung; Geschichtlicher Atlas der Rheinprovinz 6; Bonn: H. Behrend, 1914
- (in German) Köbler, Gerhard: Historisches Lexikon der deutschen Länder. Die deutschen Territorien und reichsunmittelbaren Geschlechter vom Mittelalter bis zur Gegenwart. 6. Auflage. Beck, München 1999, ISBN 3-406-44333-8
