= Frei-Laubersheim =

- Municipality
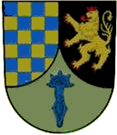
- Coat of arms

- Location of Frei-Laubersheim within Bad Kreuznach district
- Interactive map of Frei-Laubersheim
- Location within Germany Location within Rhineland-Palatinate
- Coordinates: 49°48′02″N 7°53′58″E
- Country: Germany
- State: Rhineland-Palatinate
- District: Bad Kreuznach
- Municipal assoc.: Bad Kreuznach

Government
  - Mayor (2024–29): Steffen Zorn (SPD)

Area
  - Total: 9.88 km^{2} (3.81 sq mi)
- Elevation: 180 m (590 ft)

Population (2025-12-31)
  - Total: 1,041
  - Density: 105/km^{2} (273/sq mi)
- Time zone: UTC+01:00 (CET)
  - Summer (DST): UTC+02:00 (CEST)
- Postal codes: 55546
- Dialling codes: 06703, 06709
- Vehicle registration: KH
- Website: www.frei-laubersheim.de

Frei-Laubersheim is an Ortsgemeinde – a municipality belonging to a Verbandsgemeinde, a kind of collective municipality – in the Bad Kreuznach district in Rhineland-Palatinate, Germany. It belongs to the Verbandsgemeinde of Bad Kreuznach, whose seat is in the like-named town, although this lies outside the Verbandsgemeinde. Frei-Laubersheim is a wine-growing village.

== Geography ==
=== Location ===
Frei-Laubersheim lies, like Fürfeld and Neu-Bamberg, in the Rheinhessische Schweiz – Rhenish-Hessian Switzerland – a recreational region. The village lies roughly 7 km from the gates of the spa town and district seat of Bad Kreuznach and is framed by some 125 ha of vineyards and 313 ha of wooded land bordering on Bad Kreuznach's municipal forest at Forsthaus (“forester’s house”) Spreitel.

=== Neighbouring municipalities ===
Clockwise from the north, Frei-Laubersheim's neighbours are the municipalities of Hackenheim, Volxheim, Wöllstein, Neu-Bamberg, Fürfeld and Altenbamberg and the town of Bad Kreuznach. All lie in the Bad Kreuznach district except Wöllstein, which lies in the neighbouring Alzey-Worms district.

=== Constituent communities ===
Also belonging to Frei-Laubersheim are the outlying homesteads of Am Bahnhof Laubersheim, Hof bei der Römerstraße, Johanneshof, Lindenhof and Rheingrafenhof.

== History ==
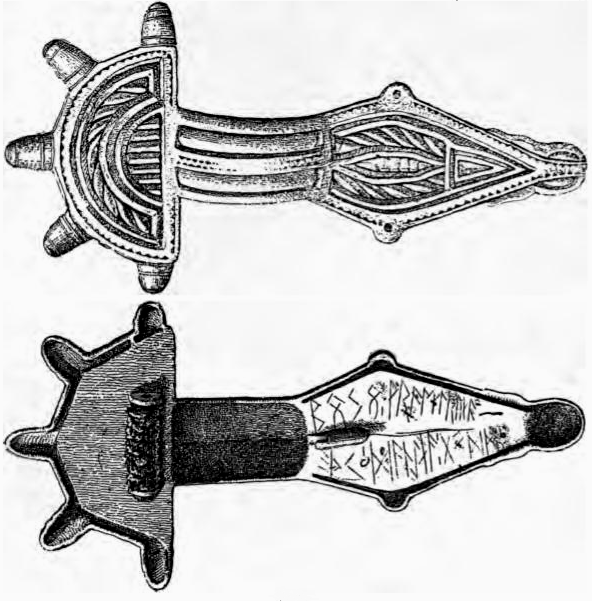
The Frei-Laubersheim fibula

Unearthed in Frei-Laubersheim in 1872 was the Frei-Laubersheim fibula, a Frankish artefact bearing a partially legible runic inscription. It is believed to date from about the 6th century AD, and it represents proof that the Frei-Laubersheim area was settled in those days. In 767/768 and 771 – some two centuries later – Frei-Laubersheim had its first documentary mentions as Liubherisheim in two donation documents that bestowed holdings upon Lorsch Abbey, and are therefore found in the Lorsch codex. Transferred to the Abbey by these acts were, among other things, vineyards within what are now Frei-Laubersheim's limits. Frei-Laubersheim can thus look back on a history well over 1,200 years long, as well as a winegrowing tradition of that same length. During the Middle Ages, many monasteries had holdings in the village at their disposal. Among these very early on, besides Lorsch, was Prüm Abbey in the Eifel, which in an 823 exchange agreement acquired, besides holdings in Grolsheim, Horrweiler and Stein-Bockenheim, also property within Frei-Laubersheim's limits. It is assumed that the village then belonged to the Altenbamberg region of the Bishopric of Verdun. Unmistakably, Tholey Abbey’s holdings leant on Verdun’s. Tholey was the village’s most influential monastery. Besides collation rights (the right to assign priests), which were part of the general use of the ecclesiastical estate and other kinds of income, the abbot collected all the produce and wine tithes. The monastery further owned an estate whose building complex is still preserved today and is mainly found within the Görtz property. The holders of power within the village throughout the Middle Ages and beyond were the Counts of Sponheim and their heirs (who were various and often changed after the Sponheims died out). Besides these lords, other nobles also held other rights in Frei-Laubersheim, mostly relating to smaller landholds. According to the official description of the Amt of Kreuznach from the former “Further” County of Sponheim, in 1601, Frei-Laubersheim was a big village with 92 households or hearths. This would yield a population figure of some 400 souls. In 1672, the village only had a few more than 200 inhabitants, proof of how sorely it had suffered in the ravages of the Thirty Years' War (1618-1648). When broad swathes of the Palatinate and the Rhineland were laid waste in the Nine Years' War (known in Germany as the Pfälzischer Erbfolgekrieg, or War of the Palatine Succession), Frei-Laubersheim, too, was affected. The number of Reformed families sank from 60 to 37. Well-to-do townsmen's houses, the church and the rectory lay in ruins. Beginning in 1707, Frei-Laubersheim belonged wholly to Electoral Palatinate as a result of a partition agreement. It was assigned to the Oberamt of Kreuznach. In the late 18th century, the village had 115 families with 464 souls, along with two churches and two schoolhouses alongside the 115 private houses. The municipal area was made up of 1,123 Morgen of cropland, 9 Morgen of vineyards, 75 Morgen of meadows and 745 Morgen of woods. After the French had overrun and occupied the German lands on the Rhine’s left bank in 1794, the region belonged from 1798 to the French First Republic, and more locally to the newly created Department of Mont-Tonnerre (or Donnersberg in German) and the Canton of Wöllstein. Frei-Laubersheim was also the seat of a mairie (“mayoralty”) as of 1800, to which Volxheim also belonged. As they did throughout Rhenish Hesse in the time of French Revolutionary rule, liberty poles, tricolour cockades and red Phrygian caps held their place in Frei-Laubersheim's everyday life. The simple peasants now became citizens, the clergyman a “folk teacher” and the church a “gathering house”. Thus was the situation after the French Revolutionary troops’ arrival in 1797 described by Pastor Fritsch, who worked as the Evangelical clergyman in Frei-Laubersheim from 1899 to 1934. In 1813 and 1814, part of the beaten Napoleonic army came through Frei-Laubersheim on its retreat, bringing with them Lazarettfieber (literally “field hospital fever” – this was a general term for any of a number of sicknesses, including gangrene, pyaemia, shingles and typhus), and this claimed 57 lives. A few months later, a new misfortune befell the village when 60,000 Russian troops on their way to the Battle of Waterloo marched through the village's streets. Such a great number of them could not have been billeted very easily, or comfortably. Under the terms of the Congress of Vienna, the land now known as Rhenish Hesse (or Rheinhessen in German, even though it is nowadays no longer in Hesse) was assigned to the Grand Duchy of Hesse. Quite possibly, in connection with the Revolutions of 1848, things such as freedom, constitution and parliament were already being hotly debated, but at the same time, one of the leading minds of the Freischärler ("irregulars") movement was living with the Frei-Laubersheim Evangelical clergyman, Pastor Matty. Details, however, are unknown. On the other hand, much is known about Frei-Laubersheim's population development in the earlier half of the 19th century. There were 590 citizens in the village in 1815, at the time when the Napoleonic Wars ended. By 1854, this had risen to 771. The century's last decades brought quiet times, and clubs began to form in the village, as they did elsewhere in the land. Frei-Laubersheim's oldest is the singing club, founded in 1882. A volunteer fire brigade followed in 1886 and a gymnastic and sport club in 1900. A particularly important event in the village's history was the opening of the railway from Sprendlingen to Fürfeld in 1898. Frei-Laubersheim got its own station on the line. The Bawettche, as the line was known locally, ran until 1954, at least for passengers. Goods service continued for a while, but in the end, the tracks were torn up in 1960. In 1880, the schoolhouse that still stands today was built. In 1917 came electric light, from neighbouring Bad Kreuznach. Only in 1954 was the watermain built. Until then, people in Frei-Laubersheim fetched water from one of the many household wells.

The town celebrated its 1250th birthday on August 13, 2017.

=== Jewish history ===
The former Jewish community in Frei-Laubersheim was always quite small and was considered an offshoot of the Jewish community in neighbouring Fürfeld, where the synagogue, which was desecrated and vandalized on Kristallnacht (9–10 November 1938), and the religious school could be found. More about the community as a whole can be found in the relevant section in the Fürfeld article. In Frei-Laubersheim, 21 Jews were counted in 1830, 25 in 1861, 18 in 1905, 16 in 1924 and in 1932, on the eve of the Third Reich, there were 11, all of whom subsequently moved away or emigrated in the face of antisemitic laws that stripped Jews of their rights, the economic boycott and other repressive measures. According to writer Arnsberg, two of the Jews from Frei-Laubersheim emigrated to the United Kingdom, three went to the United States, five went to Worms and one went to Frankfurt. According to the Gedenkbuch – Opfer der Verfolgung der Juden unter der nationalsozialistischen Gewaltherrschaft in Deutschland 1933-1945 (“Memorial Book – Victims of the Persecution of the Jews under National Socialist Tyranny”) and Yad Vashem, of all Jews who either were born in Frei-Laubersheim or lived there for a long time, 7 were the victims of Nazi persecution (birthdates in brackets):

1. Flora Baum (1920)
2. Johanna (Anna) Baum (1907)
3. Mathilde Baum (1873)
4. Rosel Baum née Baum (1913)
5. Salomon Baum (1875)
6. Wilhelmine Baum (1870)
7. Henriette Hirsch née Scharff (1897)

=== Municipality’s name ===
The village's name is typical of those of Frankish origin. It is interpreted as meaning “Liubrit’s Home” or “Liubher’s Home”. Over time, the old form Liubherisheim mutated into today's Laubersheim. The distinctive prefix “Frei-” was quite likely only added in 1261 on the occasion of the bestowing of church patronage rights on Tholey Abbey by the Chancellery of the Archbishop of Mainz, Werner. The popular prefix, “Cappes-” (meaning “cabbage”, nowadays usually spelt with a K) only cropped up in the 15th century, and since then has often been used in writing. Even today, the village is often called Cappes-Laubersheim. Apparently, cabbage-growing was once of great importance in Frei-Laubersheim.

=== Population development ===
Frei-Laubersheim's population development since Napoleonic times is shown in the table below. The figures for the years from 1871 to 1987 are drawn from census data:

Year	Inhabitants
1815	590
1835	786
1871	805
1905	835
1939	770

Year	Inhabitants
1950	952
1961	921
1970	952
1987	994
2005	1,077

== Religion ==
As at 31 August 2013, there are 1,021 full-time residents in Frei-Laubersheim, and of those, 513 are Evangelical (50.245%), 313 are Catholic (30.656%), 12 (1.175%) belong to other religious groups and 183 (17.924%) either have no religion or will not reveal their religious affiliation.

== Politics ==
=== Municipal council ===
The council is made up of 16 council members, who were elected by proportional representation at the municipal election held on 7 June 2009, and the honorary mayor as chairman. The municipal election held on 7 June 2009 yielded the following results:

Year	SPD	CDU	WG 1	WG 2	Total
2009	3	4	2	7	16 seats
2004	3	5	2	6	16 seats

“WG” means Wählergruppe – “voters’ group”.

=== Mayor ===
Frei-Laubersheim's mayor is Steffen Zorn, he was elected in 2024.

=== Coat of arms ===
The municipality's arms might be described thus: Tierced in mantle dexter chequy of twenty-four azure and Or, sinister sable a lion rampant of the second armed, langued and crowned gules and in base argent the Frei-Laubersheim fibula of the first.

The “chequy” field on the dexter (armsbearer's right, viewer's left) side is a reference to the village's former allegiance to the Counts of Sponheim. The charge on the sinister (armsbearer's left, viewer's right) side is also a reference to former lords, in this case Electoral Palatinate. The other charge, in base, is the Frei-Laubersheim fibula (brooch), found in the municipality in 1872 and not only a symbol but also proof that the Franks were living in the area very early on.

== Culture and sightseeing ==
=== Buildings ===
The following are listed buildings or sites in Rhineland-Palatinate’s Directory of Cultural Monuments:

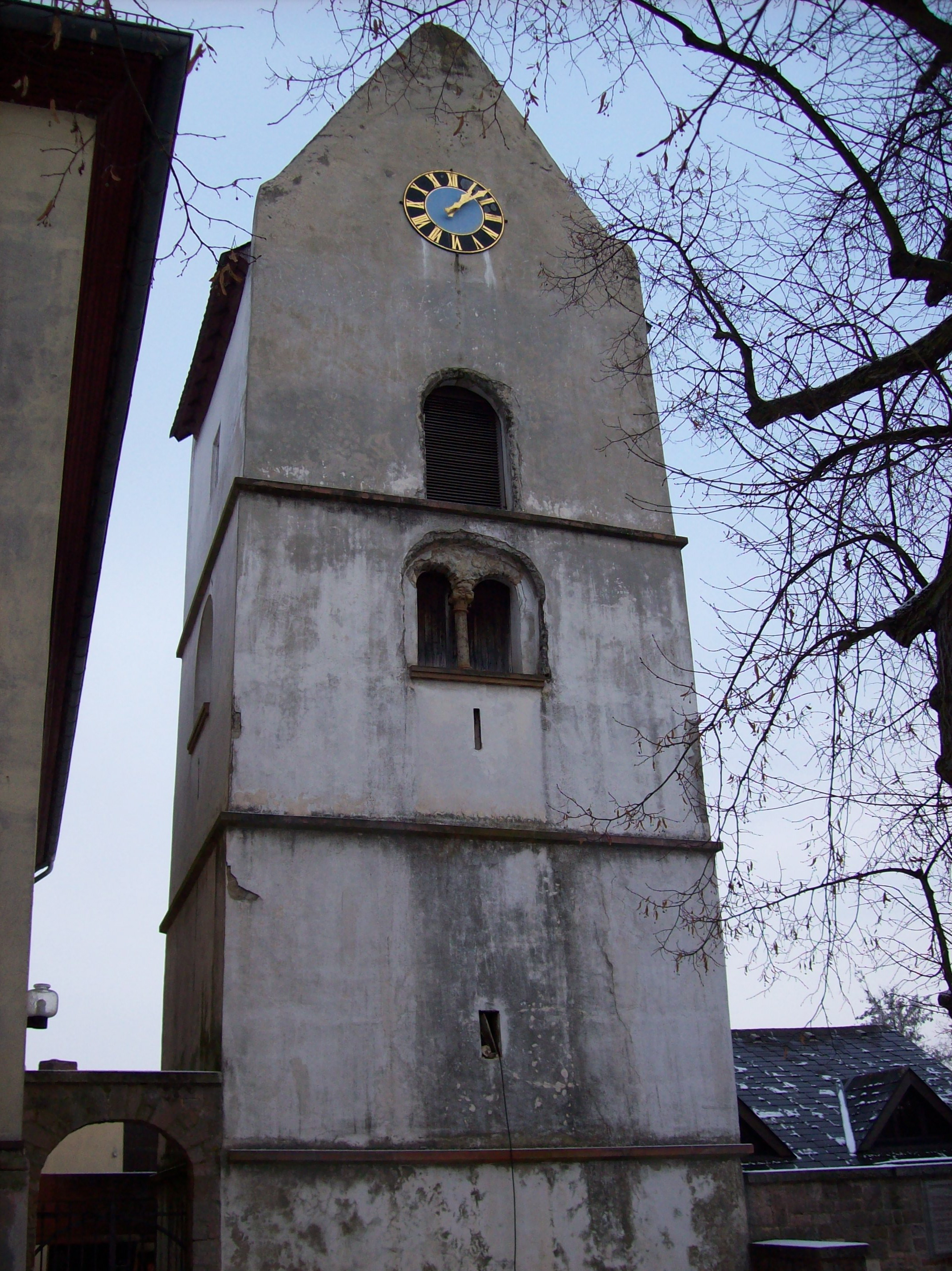
Kirchenpforte 9/11 – Saint Maurice’s Catholic Parish Church

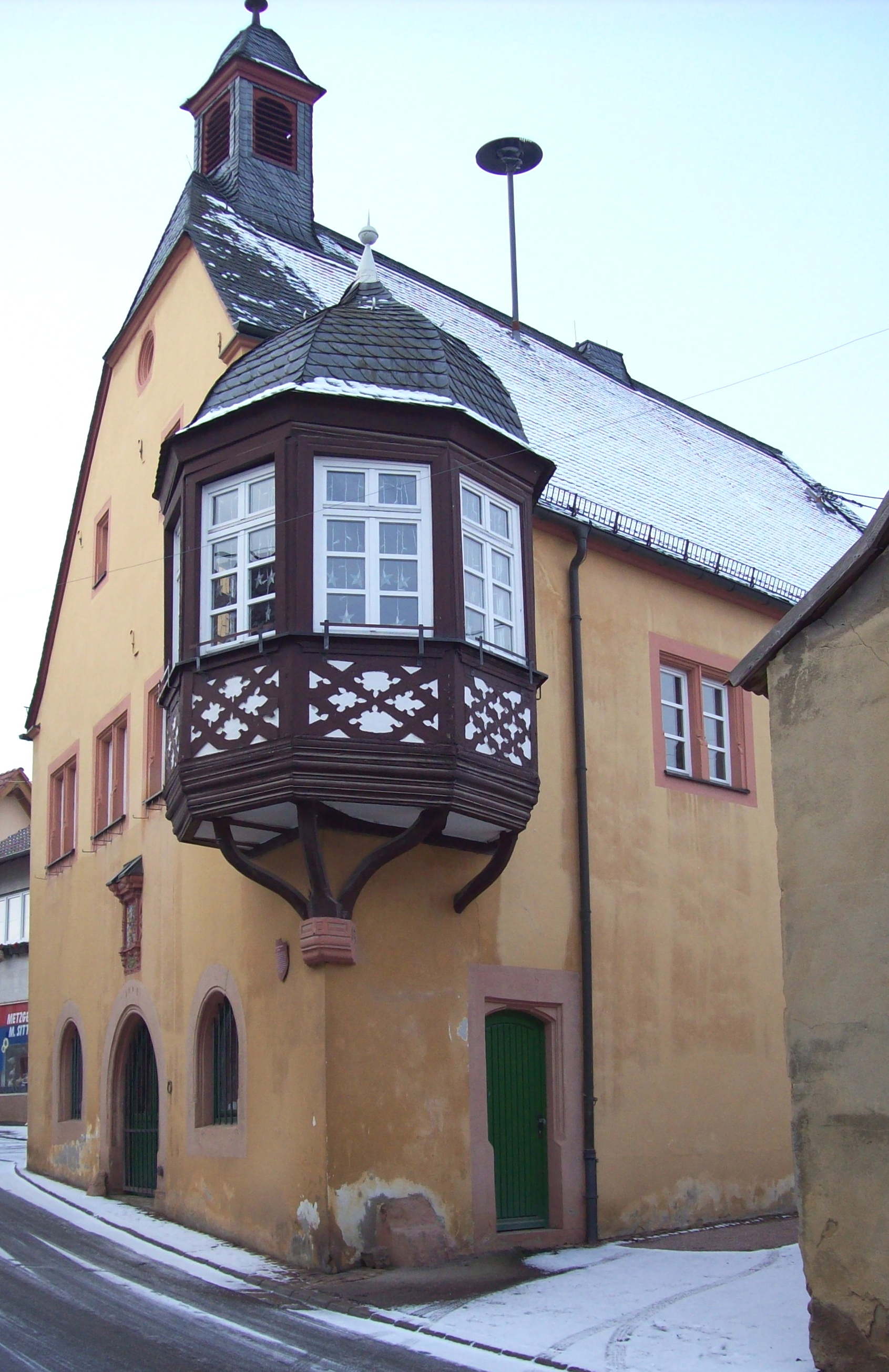
Rathausstraße 9 – Town hall

- Saint Maurice’s Catholic Parish Church (Pfarrkirche St. Mauritius), Kirchenpforte 9/11 – Late Baroque aisleless church, 1792–1796, Romanesque tower, earlier half of the 13th century; warriors’ memorial 1914-1918, Muschelkalk pillar, 1920s/1930s
- Village core, Rathausstraße 1–3, 2–6, 9, 10–16 and Philipp-Wehr-Straße 1 (monumental zone) – contiguous building structure of the 17th to 19th century with two-floor buildings throughout, among them two timber-frame houses, a hook-shaped estate with gateway complex as well as a four-sided estate with a gatehouse
- Am Bahnhof Laubersheim 1 – former railway station; two-and-a-half-floor building with half-hip roof, sandstone-block, one-floor addition, about 1880/1890
- Am Johannisgarten 1 – Evangelical rectory; Late Classicist plastered building, 1836–1838; setting exposed to entrance to village
- Fronpforte 3 – estate complex; Baroque timber-frame house, plastered, earlier half of the 18th century
- Fronpforte 7 – Baroque timber-frame house, partly solid, 1726, on cellars from 1571
- Kirchenpforte 4 – estate complex with gateway complex, marked 1749; Baroque house, partly timber-frame
- Kirchenpforte 5 – former Tholey Abbey chaplaincy estate; one-floor Baroque building with mansard roof, 18th century
- Kirchenpforte 7 – former Tholey Abbey priory (former Catholic rectory); estate complex; Baroque house, 18th century; in the Catholic rectory a Baroque sculpture; at the gateway arch a post-Baroque Crucifix, marked 1814
- Nachtigallenweg, Jewish graveyard (monumental zone) – area laid out in 1820, on it some 30 gravestones up to 1934
- Philipp-Wehr-Straße 3 – Late Baroque timber-frame house, partly solid, marked 1763
- Philipp-Wehr-Straße 22 – Late Baroque house, partly timber-frame, late 18th century, gateway complex marked 1774
- Philipp-Wehr-Straße 25 – three-sided estate with gateway complex, earlier half of the 19th century
- Philipp-Wehr-Straße 29 – Baroque timber-frame house, partly solid, about 1700
- Rathausstraße 2 – Baroque timber-frame house, plastered, 17th/18th century, gateway complex, earlier half of the 19th century
- Rathausstraße 6 – Baroque timber-frame house, to a great extent plastered, marked 1728
- Rathausstraße 9 – town hall; Renaissance building with ground-floor hall, timber-frame oriel window, marked 1603
- Rathausstraße 16 – “Hof Sponheimer”, former estate of Altmünster Abbey at Mainz; Late Gothic solid building, marked 1604, 1753 and remodelled in the 19th century
- Rathausstraße 19 – Baroque estate complex, partly timber-frame, 18th century
- Rathausstraße/Ecke Philipp-Wehr-Straße – Gothic Revival fountain, marked 1884
- Rheingrafenstraße 7 – hook-shaped estate; timber-frame house, plastered, early 19th century
- Schulstraße 1 – school, Late Classicist, marked 1880
- Ruin of Saint Catherine's Chapel (Katharinenkapelle) – foundation of the former Late Gothic aisleless church, possibly from the 13th or 14th century

=== Clubs ===
The following clubs are currently active in Frei-Laubersheim:

- Bauernverein Frei-Laubersheim — farmers’ association
- Förderverein Freunde der Feuerwehr Frei-Laubersheim — “Friends of the Fire Brigade” promotional association
- Förderverein Grundschule Frei-Laubersheim — primary school promotional association
- Förderverein Jugend und Freizeitanlage Hönig e.V. Frei-Laubersheim — youth and leisure complex promotional association
- Freiwillige Feuerwehr Frei-Laubersheim — fire brigade
- Landfrauenverein Frei-Laubersheim — countrywomen's club
- Museumsverein Frei-Laubersheim — museum club
- Musikzug TuS Frei-Laubersheim — band
- Spiel- und Unterhaltungsverein Frei-Laubersheim — game and conversation club
- Spiessbratenclub — spit roast club
- Turn- und Sportverein 1900 Frei Laubersheim — gymnastic and sport club
- VdK-Ortsverband Frei-Laubersheim - Neu-Bamberg — social advocacy group

=== Regular events ===
Frei-Laubersheim's kermis (church consecration festival, locally known as the Kerwe) is held each year on the third weekend in September. Also held then is the Offene Ateliers event.

== Economy and infrastructure ==
=== Education ===
Frei-Laubersheim has one primary school. Housed at the town hall is the municipal library.

=== Winegrowing ===
Frei-Laubersheim belongs to the “Bingen Winegrowing Area” within the Rhenish Hesse wine region. In business in the village are 20 winegrowing operations, and the area of vineyard planted is 121 ha. Some 77% of the wine grown here (as at 2007) is white wine varieties. In 1979, there were still 48 winegrowing operations, and the vineyard area, at 116 ha, was slightly less than what it is now.

=== Transport ===
Running through Frei-Laubersheim is Bundesstraße 420. To the northeast is found the Autobahn A 61. Serving nearby Bad Kreuznach is a railway station on the Alsenz Valley Railway (Alsenztalbahn) and the Nahe Valley Railway (Bingen–Saarbrücken).

== Famous people ==
=== Sons and daughters of the town ===
- Bernd Rusinski (b. 30 January 1954; d. 2 December 2004), Schlager singer

=== Famous people associated with the municipality ===
- Siegfried Kärcher (b. 4 October 1974), visual artist, Moldau-Stipendium recipient (Hesse) 2009
