= Hackenheim =

- Municipality
- Coat of arms

- Location of Hackenheim within Bad Kreuznach district
- Interactive map of Hackenheim
- Location within Germany Location within Rhineland-Palatinate
- Coordinates: 49°49′30″N 7°53′58″E
- Country: Germany
- State: Rhineland-Palatinate
- District: Bad Kreuznach
- Municipal assoc.: Bad Kreuznach

Government
  - Mayor (2019–24): Sylvia Fels

Area
  - Total: 4.31 km^{2} (1.66 sq mi)
- Elevation: 180 m (590 ft)

Population (2025-12-31)
  - Total: 2,186
  - Density: 507/km^{2} (1,310/sq mi)
- Time zone: UTC+01:00 (CET)
  - Summer (DST): UTC+02:00 (CEST)
- Postal codes: 55546
- Dialling codes: 0671
- Vehicle registration: KH
- Website: www.hackenheim.de

Hackenheim (German pronunciation: [ˈhakn̩haɪm]) is an Ortsgemeinde – a municipality belonging to a Verbandsgemeinde, a kind of collective municipality – in the Bad Kreuznach district in Rhineland-Palatinate, Germany. It belongs to the Verbandsgemeinde of Bad Kreuznach, whose seat is in the like-named town, although this lies outside the Verbandsgemeinde. Hackenheim is a winegrowing village.

== Geography ==
=== Location ===
Hackenheim lies just outside the district seat of Bad Kreuznach, roughly 3 km east of the Nahe and 16 km south of the Rhine at Bingen. On the Kirchberg, 220 m above sea level (NN), there is a good view of the Hunsrück, the Rhein-Nahe-Eck (the point of land at the mouth of the Nahe where it empties into the Rhine) and on into the cleared land around Rüdesheim am Rhein, whereon stands the Niederwalddenkmal. Beyond that stretches the Rheingaugebirge, the westernmost part of the High Taunus, with the Kalte Herberge (which despite its name, which means “Cold Hostel”, is a mountain) and the Hohe Kanzel (“High Pulpit”) above Wiesbaden. Yet farther on, the Feldberg area can be seen with the Kleiner Feldberg, the Großer Feldberg and the Altkönig. Towards the east, the view is over the hills of the Rhenish-Hessian Switzerland, on a clear day as far as the Odenwald.

=== Neighbouring municipalities ===
Clockwise from the north, Hackenheim's neighbours are the town of Bad Kreuznach and the municipalities of Volxheim and Frei-Laubersheim, all of which likewise lie within the Bad Kreuznach district.

=== Constituent communities ===
Also belonging to Hackenheim are the outlying homesteads of Antoniushof, Bonnheimer Hof, Darmstädter Hof, Im Rosengarten and Weingut Rosenhof.

== History ==
It is hard to determine whether a place mentioned several times in the Lorsch codex, called Hagenheim can in any instance be identified as the village now known as Hackenheim. Even if it can be established that Hackenheim already existed in 1124, and even if it can be established that its name in those days was indeed Hagenheim, the references in the Lorsch codex rather seem likelier to be to the place now called Hahnheim on the River Selz. It is believed, however, that Hackenheim goes back to Frankish times, and a documentary mention would even have been possible as far back as the 8th century. The name is interpreted to mean “Hajo’s Home” or “Hacko’s Home”. Hackenheim's first documentary mention is thus quite uncertain, but it may be a mention found in one of Emperor Henry II's documents, issued in 1023.

Defining for the village in the centuries that followed was the influence exercised by the Counts of Sponheim. In Hackenheim, they were, however, not the only fiefholders, for there were quite a few other ecclesiastical and secular landlords. Among them were the monks at Pfaffen-Schwabenheim Abbey. The Disibodenberg Monastery, too, owned an estate, although about 1600, this was pledged to Electoral Palatinate. Hackenheim was once quite a small village. In 1601, there were only 40 hearths (for which read “households”), from which it can be concluded that the number of inhabitants was roughly 160. After the Counts of Sponheim died out, the territory of the Hackenheim region was divided and knew a whole succession of oft-changing lords. As of 1707, however, Hackenheim was wholly owned by Electoral Palatinate.

In the time of the Thirty Years' War, the population shrank considerably. In 1652 (four years after the war ended), only nine family heads could be counted all together. By 1787, though, Hackenheim had sprung back from that war (and later ones in the 17th century) for there were now 46 houses used by 43 families, representing about 200 inhabitants. One important mediaeval establishment was long preserved: the old high court with its gallows, which supposedly stood on the flat-topped ridge of the Galgenberg (“Gallows Mountain”) at the passing place on the road from Kreuznach to Hackenheim near the Darmstädter Hof. The rural cadastral name “Am Hochgericht” (“At the High Court”) even today identifies the place where death sentences passed by the Kreuznacher Landgericht were carried out. Until the 1930s it was still recognizable as a patch of waste ground of about 40 m^{2} with sparse grass growth. In the locals’ view, the place was cursed, for nothing but weeds grew there. This old folk belief was only laid to rest in recent times. Today, the former hanging place lies in the middle of land used as vineyards and can no longer be recognized for what it once was centuries ago.

From the time of Revolutionary and then later Napoleonic French rule, very little in the way of details about what happened locally has reached the present day. It is known, however, that Hackenheim belonged to the Mairie (“Mayoralty”) of Bosenheim, the Canton of Wöllstein and the Department of Mont-Tonnerre (or Donnersberg in German) and only became a self-administering municipality once again after the Congress of Vienna had assigned the region to the Grand Duchy of Hesse in 1816, after that state along with two others, and the Kingdom of Prussia and the Austrian Empire, concluded a territorial deal of their own in that year. Hesse grouped Hackenheim into the Province of Rhenish Hesse (Rheinhessen).

After the cantons within Rhenish Hesse had been abolished, the village passed in 1835 to the newly established Bingen district, and then in 1852 to the Alzey district. The border had been drawn between the Grand Duchy and the Kingdom of Prussia right near Hackenheim. The Darmstädter Hof, an outlying homestead of Hackenheim, lay on the Hessian side, whereas what is now the Desoi winery (whose address is “Am Darmstädter Hof, Bad Kreuznach”) lay just beyond the border on the Prussian side. Consequently, the Darmstädter Hof was a rather important customs post. Especially dutiable were foodstuffs, drinks and tobacco, and among those, especially wine. This was very cheap in Hesse, which led to widespread smuggling.

The Darmstädter Hof was also well known for its dancing events, which were held every four weeks in a great, wooden-walled tent. The advantage of Hackenheim having a further great hall right in the village and its favourable location at the borders of not only Hesse and Prussia but also the Kingdom of Bavaria (to which the Congress of Vienna had awarded a sizeable exclave in the Palatinate) led the whole region's Jewish population to hold a great ball here each year in late autumn. Some 400 to 500 people would come to this ball, dance to music played by an orchestra from Kreuznach, exchange news and enjoy some good wine. The Hackenheim Jewish ball came to an end about 1850 when the gathering's usual host emigrated to the United States.

In the course of the general local developments, the population reached 568 in 1846, only to shrink back to 503 by 1871. The commercial and industrial development of the town of Bad Kreuznach in the last quarter of the 19th century, with its rising demand for workers and the resulting growth in population in its suburbs made itself felt in Hackenheim: in 1905, the village already had 770 inhabitants, and by 1936, this had risen to 978. As early as 1903, the village joined the Nahe-Appelbach area's water collective and got itself a watermain. A year later, sewerage was laid under Hauptstraße (“Main Street”), a remarkable feature for that time. In 1917, Hackenheim got electrical power from Kreuznach. In the course of post-war development, many people from neighbouring Bad Kreuznach moved to Hackenheim. This population growth brought about a structural shift within the village: Agriculture, which had been the dominant livelihood in Hackenheim right up to the 1950s shrank in importance, and the village became first and foremost a bedroom community for workers from all walks of life.

=== Population development ===
Hackenheim's population development since Napoleonic times is shown in the table below. The figures for the years from 1871 to 1987 are drawn from census data:

| Year | Inhabitants |
|---|---|
| 1815 | 253 |
| 1835 | 568 |
| 1871 | 503 |
| 1905 | 770 |
| 1939 | 978 |

| Year | Inhabitants |
|---|---|
| 1950 | 1,104 |
| 1961 | 1,135 |
| 1970 | 1,531 |
| 1987 | 1,709 |
| 2005 | 2,019 |

== Religion ==
As at 30 September 2013, there are 2,103 full-time residents in Hackenheim, and of those, 582 are Evangelical (27.675%), 1,060 are Catholic (50.404%), 3 are Greek Orthodox (0.143%), 2 are Russian Orthodox (0.095%), 43 (2.045%) belong to other religious groups and 413 (19.639%) either have no religion or will not reveal their religious affiliation.

== Politics ==
=== Municipal council ===
The council is made up of 16 council members, who were elected by proportional representation at the municipal election held on 7 June 2009, and the honorary mayor as chairwoman. The municipal election held on 7 June 2009 yielded the following results:

| Year | SPD | CDU | FWG | Total |
|---|---|---|---|---|
| 2009 | 2 | 5 | 9 | 16 seats |
| 2004 | 2 | 5 | 9 | 16 seats |

=== Mayor ===
Hackenheim's mayor is Sylvia Fels.

=== Coat of arms ===
The German blazon reads: Im Schildfuß ein geteiltes Wappen. Die obere Hälfte ist in Blau und Gold geschachtet. In der unteren Hälfte in Grün zwei gekreuzte silberne Hacken. Über diesem Schild vor blauem Himmel die silberne Ganz-Figur des heiligen Michael als Drachentöter.

The municipality's arms might in English heraldic language be described thus: Azure on ground Or Saint Michael with wings erect proper with nimbus of the second slaying a dragon gules at his feet with a lance of the second, surmounting the whole in base an inescutcheon party per fess chequy of fifteen azure and Or and vert two hoes in saltire argent.

In the Middle Ages, Hackenheim belonged to the “Further” County of Sponheim, and then passed after that house had died out into joint rule by the Margraviate of Baden and Electoral Palatinate. From 1707 until the late 18th century, the latter was the only lord. The inescutcheon, or small shield within the arms, is partly canting (the two hoes, which are called Hacken in German) and partly drawn from the arms once borne by the Counts of Sponheim (the “chequy” pattern). The inescutcheon is inspired by an old court seal known to have been used in 1584 and 1604 (an original seal stamp is kept at the Darmstadt State Archive, with a plaster copy at the Mainz State Archive). Saint Michael is the local church patron, whom the municipality wanted to combine with the historical composition in the inescutcheon. The inescutcheon is also about the only part of the arms for which the German blazon names tinctures. The arms have been borne since 1953 when they were approved by the Rhineland-Palatinate Ministry of the Interior.

=== Town partnerships ===
Hackenheim fosters partnerships with the following places:

- Tossiat, Ain, France since 1992

A “twinning committee” was set up in 1997, registered as Freunde Der Partnerschaft Tossiat - Hackenheim e.V. in Germany, and is made up of 60 households who wish to develop relations between Tossiat's and Hackenheim's inhabitants, in tight collaboration with the commune. After a few informal exchanges, the twinning charter was signed in 1992. Ever since, strong bonds have been woven between clubs (in sport, music and firefighting, for instance) and schools. Summer holidays are a time when youth meetings can take place between groups from each country, and a junior youth bureau came into being in 2001. There is no dearth of opportunities for each of the members to welcome those from across the Rhine, or to go and visit them.

== Culture and sightseeing ==
=== Buildings ===
The following are listed buildings or sites in Rhineland-Palatinate’s Directory of Cultural Monuments:

- Hauptstraße 28 – former Saint Michael’s Catholic Quasiparish Church (Pfarrkuratiekirche St. Michael); post-Baroque aisleless church, 1807–1809, expanded 1890/1891
- Hauptstraße 29/31 – long timber-frame house, plastered, essentially possibly from the early 17th century, marked 1761
- Hauptstraße 30 – former school; Late Classicist building with half-hip roof, marked 1884

=== Regular events ===
Besides the wine festival held by the Verbandsgemeinde of Bad Kreuznach, which is held each year in June in one of the constituent municipalities, there has also been since 2004 the Rendezvous am Kapellsche. This wine festival on the Kirchberg is always held in July. Then there is the kermis (church consecration festival, locally known as the Kerb) each September. The sport club TuS Hackenheim stages each year on the night of German Unity Day (3 October) the Kölschstandparty (Kölsch being a kind of beer). The music club, on the other hand, organizes the Vati-Party (“Daddy Party”) on Father's Day (Ascension Day in Germany).

=== Clubs ===
- Bauern- und Winzerverein Hackenheim — farmers’ and winegrowers’ association
- Chorgemeinschaft “Frohsinn” 1952 Hackenheim e.V. — choir association
- Feuerwehrförderverein Hackenheim — fire brigade promotional association
- Freiwillige Feuerwehr Hackenheim — volunteer fire brigade
- Freunde Der Partnerschaft Tossiat-Hackenheim e.V. — town partnership committee
- Karnevalverein “Hackenemer Nachteulen” — Shrovetide Carnival (Fastnacht) club (“Night Owls”)
- Katholischer Kirchenchor St. Michael Hackenheim — Catholic church choir
- Musikverein “Gemütlichkeit” Hackenheim 1923 e.V. Hackenheim — music club
- Orgelbauverein Hackenheim — organ-building club
- Tennisclub 1972 im TuS Hackenheim — tennis club
- Turn- u. Sportverein 1863 Hackenheim — gymnastic and sport club
- Volksbildungswerk Hackenheim — public education

== Economy and infrastructure ==
=== Winegrowing ===
Hackenheim belongs to the “Bingen Winegrowing Area” within the Rhenish Hesse wine region. In business in the village are 14 winegrowing operations, and the area of vineyard planted is 146 ha. Some 72% of the wine grown here (as at 2007) is white wine varieties. In 1979, there were still 47 winegrowing operations, and the vineyard area, at 127 ha, was somewhat less than what it is now.

=== Transport ===
Hackenheim lies right on Bundesstraße 428 and Landesstraße 412. The feeder road to the Autobahnen A 61 (Koblenz–Ludwigshafen) and A 63 lies some 5 km away. Serving nearby Bad Kreuznach is a railway station served by trains on the Alsenz Valley Railway (Alsenztalbahn) and the Nahe Valley Railway (Bingen–Saarbrücken).

=== Education ===
Hackenheim has a kindergarten and a primary school. A public education association (Volksbildungswerk) offers adults, youths and children various educational programmes.
