= Graf =

Historical title of the German nobility

Image of a Grafenkrone, the heraldic coronet of a titular Graf

Heraldic headpiece of a mediatised Graf

Graf (German pronunciation: [ɡʁaːf]; feminine: Gräfin [ˈɡʁɛːfɪn]) is a historical title of the German nobility and later also of the Russian nobility, usually translated as "count". Considered to be intermediate among noble ranks, the title is often treated as equivalent to the British title of "earl" (whose female version is "countess").

The German nobility was gradually divided into high and low nobility. The high nobility included those counts who ruled immediate imperial territories of "princely size and importance" for which they had a seat and vote in the Imperial Diet.

== Etymology and origin ==
The word Graf derives from Middle High German: grave, which is usually derived from Latin: graphio. Graphio is in turn thought to come from the Byzantine title grapheus, which ultimately derives from the Greek verb γρᾰ́φειν (graphein) 'to write'. Other explanations have been put forward, however; Jacob and Wilhelm Grimm, while still noting the potential of a Greek derivation, suggested a connection to Gothic: gagrêfts, meaning 'decision, decree'. However, the Grimms preferred a solution that allows a connection to Old English: gerēfa 'reeve', in which the ge- is a prefix, and which the Grimms derive from Proto-Germanic *rōva 'number'.

== History ==
The comital title of Graf is common to various European territories where German was or is the official or vernacular tongue, including Austria, Germany, Switzerland, Luxembourg, Liechtenstein, Alsace, the Baltic states and other former Habsburg crown lands. In Germany, all legal privileges of the nobility have been officially abolished since August 1919, and Graf, like any other hereditary title, is treated as part of the legal surname. In Austria, its use is banned by law, as with all hereditary titles and nobiliary particles. In Switzerland, the title is not acknowledged in law. In the monarchies of Belgium, Liechtenstein and Luxembourg, where German is one of the official languages, the title continues to be recognised, used and, occasionally, granted by the national fons honorum, the reigning monarch.

From the Middle Ages, a Graf usually ruled a territory known as a Grafschaft ('county'). In the Holy Roman Empire, many Imperial counts (Reichsgrafen) retained near-sovereign authority in their lands until the Congress of Vienna subordinated them to larger, neighboring monarchs through the German mediatisation process of 1815, preserving their precedence, allocating familial representation in local legislatures, some jurisdictional immunities and the prestigious privilege of Ebenbürtigkeit. In regions of Europe where nobles did not actually exercise Landeshoheit over the populace, the Graf long retained specific feudal privileges over the land and in the villages in his county, such as rights to peasant service, to periodic fees for use of common infrastructure such as timber, mills, wells and pastures.

These rights gradually eroded and were largely eliminated before or during the 19th century, leaving the Graf with few legal privileges beyond land ownership, although comital estates in German-speaking lands were often substantial. Nonetheless, various rulers in German-speaking lands granted the hereditary title of Graf to their subjects, particularly after the abolition of the Holy Roman Empire in 1806. Although lacking the prestige and powers of the former Imperial counts, they remained legal members of the local nobility, entitled to whatever minor privileges were recognised at the ruler's court. The title, translated as "count", was generally accepted and used in other countries by custom.

Many Continental counts in Germany and Austria were titled Graf without any additional qualification. Except in the Kingdom of Prussia from the 19th century, the title of Graf was not restricted by primogeniture: it was inherited by all legitimate descendants in the male line of the original titleholder, the males also inheriting an approximately equal share of the family's wealth and estates. Usually a hyphenated suffix indicated which of the familial lands a particular line of counts held, e.g. Castell-Rudenhausen.

In the medieval Holy Roman Empire, some counts took or were granted unique variations of the gräfliche title, often relating to a specific domain or jurisdiction of responsibility, e.g. Landgraf, Markgraf, Pfalzgraf (Count Palatine), Burggraf, Wildgraf, Waldgraf, Altgraf, Raugraf, etc. Although as a title Graf ranked, officially, below those of Herzog (duke) and Fürst (prince), the Holy Roman Emperor could and did recognise unique concessions of authority or rank to some of these nobles, raising them to the status of gefürsteter Graf or "princely count". But a grafliche title with such a prefix did not always signify a higher than comital rank or membership in the Hochadel. Only the more important of these titles, historically associated with degrees of sovereignty, remained in use by the 19th century, specifically Markgraf and Landgraf.

In Russia, the title of Graf (Russian: Граф; feminine: Графиня, romanized Grafinya) was introduced by Peter the Great. The first Russian graf (or count) was Boris Petrovich Sheremetev, elevated to this dignity in 1706 for the pacification of the Astrakhan uprising (1705–1706). Then Peter granted six more graf dignities. Initially, when someone was elevated to the graf's dignity of the Russian Empire, the elevated person's recognition by the German Emperor in the same dignity of the Holy Roman Empire was required. Subsequently, the latter ceased to be obligatory.

== Nobiliary titles containing the term Graf ==
Some are approximately of comital rank, some higher, some lower. The more important ones are treated in separate articles (follow the links); a few minor, rarer ones only in sections below.

German	English	Comment/ etymology
Markgraf	Margrave (only continental) or Marquess	Mark 'march, border province' + Graf. Exercised authority over territory on the border of the Empire.
Landgraf	Landgrave	Land 'country' + Graf. Exercised authority over an entire province.
Reichsgraf	Imperial Count	Reich 'Empire' + Graf. Imperial count, whose title was granted or recognised by the Emperor.
Gefürsteter Graf	Princely Count	German verb for "made into a Reichsfürst" + Graf.
Pfalzgraf	Count Palatine or Palsgrave (archaic)	Pfalz 'palatial estate, Palatinate' + Graf. Originally ruled "with the authority of the Imperial Palace"; later, ruler of the "Palace-land", i.e., the Palatinate.
Rheingraf	Rhinegrave	Rhein 'river Rhine' + Graf. Ruled territory bordering the Rhine River.
Burggraf	Burgrave	Burg 'castle, burgh' + Graf. Ruled territory surrounding or dominated by a fortified castle.
Altgraf	Altgrave	alt 'old' + Graf. A count whose title pre-dated Imperial grants of the comital title. Unique to the Salm family.
Freigraf	Free Count	frei 'free' (allodial?) + Graf. Both a feudal title of comital rank and a more technical office.
Gaugraf	Gaugrave	Gau 'imperial territory' + Graf. Ruler of a gau in the Carolingian Empire. Most gäue later became counties (Grafschaften).
Waldgraf	Wildgrave	Wald 'forest' + Graf. Ruled a heavily forested area.
Raugraf	Raugrave	Rau ('raw, uninhabited, wilderness') + Graf. Ruled territory centered on an undeveloped area of land.
Vizegraf	Viscount	Vize 'vice-, substitute' + Graf.

== Reichsgraf ==
A Reichsgraf was a nobleman whose title of count was conferred or confirmed by the Holy Roman Emperor, and meant "Imperial Count", i.e., a count of the Holy Roman Empire. Since the feudal era, any count whose territory lay within the Empire and was under the immediate jurisdiction of the Emperor with a shared vote in the Reichstag came to be considered a member of the "upper nobility" (Hochadel) in Germany, along with princes (Fürsten), dukes (Herzöge), electors (Kurfürsten), and the emperor himself. A count who was not a Reichsgraf was likely to possess only a mesne fief (Afterlehen) — he was subject to an immediate prince of the empire, such as a duke or prince elector.

However, the Holy Roman Emperors also occasionally granted the title of Reichsgraf to subjects and foreigners who did not possess and were not granted immediate territories — or, sometimes, any territory at all. Such titles were purely honorific.

In English, Reichsgraf is usually translated simply as count and is combined with a territorial suffix (e.g., Count of Holland, Count Reuss) or a surname (Count Fugger, Count von Browne). Even after the abolition of the Holy Roman Empire in 1806, the Reichsgrafen retained precedence above other counts in Germany. Those who had been quasi-sovereign until German mediatisation retained, until 1918, status and privileges pertaining to members of reigning dynasties.

Notable Reichsgrafen have included:

- Castell
- Fugger
- Henneberg, a title merged into the imperial dignity
- Leiningen
- Nassau-Weilburg since 26 September 1366 (previously, simply Graf)
- Pappenheim
- Stolberg
- Tyrol as a dominion of the Austrian crown

A complete list of Reichsgrafen with immediate territories as of 1792 can be found in the List of Reichstag participants (1792).

== Margrave ==
A Markgraf or Margrave was originally a military governor of a Carolingian "mark" (march), a border province. In medieval times the borders of the Holy Roman Empire were especially vulnerable to foreign attack, so the hereditary count of these "marches" of the realm was sometimes granted greater authority than other vassals to ensure security. They bore the title "margrave" until the few who survived as sovereigns assumed higher titles when the Empire was abolished in 1806.

Examples: Margrave of Baden, Margrave of Brandenburg-Bayreuth. Since the abolition of the German Empire at the end of World War I, the heirs of some of its former monarchies have resumed use of margrave as a title of pretence, e.g. Maria Emanuel, Margrave of Meissen and Maximilian, Margrave of Baden.

== Landgrave ==
A Landgraf or Landgrave was a nobleman of comital rank in feudal Germany whose jurisdiction stretched over a territory larger than usually held by a count within the Holy Roman Empire. The status of a landgrave was elevated, usually being associated with suzerains who were subject to the Holy Roman Emperor but exercised sovereign authority within their lands and independence greater than the prerogatives to which a simple Graf was entitled, but the title itself implied no specific, legal privileges.

Landgraf occasionally continued in use as the subsidiary title of such minor royalty as the Elector of Hesse or the Grand Duke of Saxe-Weimar, who functioned as the Landgrave of Thuringia in the first decade of the 20th century. The jurisdiction of a landgrave was a Landgrafschaft or landgraviate, and the wife of a landgrave was a Landgräfin or landgravine.

Examples: Landgrave of Thuringia, Landgrave of Hesse, Landgrave of Leuchtenberg, Landgrave of Fürstenberg-Weitra. The title is now borne by the hereditary heirs to the deposed monarchs of Hesse (Donatus, Landgrave of Hesse and Wilhelm, Landgrave of Hesse-Philippsthal-Barchfeld), who lost their throne in 1918.

== Gefürsteter Graf ==
A gefürsteter Graf (English: princely count) is a Reichsgraf who was recognised by the Holy Roman Emperor as bearing the higher rank or exercising the more extensive authority of an Imperial prince (Reichsfürst). While nominally retaining only a comital title, he was accorded princely rank and, usually, arms by the emperor. An example of this would be the Princely County of Habsburg, the namesake of the Habsburg Dynasty, which at various points in time controlled vast amounts of lands throughout Europe.

== Burgrave/Viscount ==
A Burggraf, or Burgrave, was a 12th- and 13th-century military and civil judicial governor of a castle (compare castellan, custos, keeper) of the town it dominated and of its immediate surrounding countryside. His jurisdiction was a Burggrafschaft, burgraviate.

Over time the office and domain to which it was attached tended to become hereditary by Imperial grant or retention over generations by members of the same family.

Examples: Burgrave of Nuremberg, Burgrave of (Burggraf zu) Dohna-Schlobitten, Burg grafschaft Colditz.

Initially burgrave suggested a similar function and history as other titles rendered in German by Vizegraf, in Dutch as Burggraaf or in English as Viscount (Latin: Vicecomes); the deputy of a count charged with exercising the count's prerogatives in overseeing one or more of the count's strongholds or fiefs, as the burgrave dwelt usually in a castle or fortified town. Some became hereditary and by the modern era obtained rank just below a count, though above a Freiherr' (baron) who might hold a fief as vassal of the original count.

== Rhinegrave, Wildgrave, Raugrave, Altgrave ==
Unlike the other comital titles, Rhinegrave, Wildgrave (Waldgrave), Raugrave, and Altgrave are not generic titles. Rather, each is linked to a specific countship, whose unique title emerged during the course of its history. These unusually named countships were equivalent in rank to other Counts of the Empire who were of Hochadel status, being entitled to a shared seat and vote in the Imperial Diet and possessing Imperial immediacy, most of which would be mediatised upon dissolution of the Empire in 1806.

- Rhinegrave (German: Rheingraf) was the title of the count of the Rheingau, a county located between Wiesbaden and Lorch on the right bank of the Rhine. Their castle was known as the Rheingrafenstein Castle. After the Rhinegraves inherited the Wildgraviate (see below) and parts of the Countship of Salm, they called themselves Wild-and-Rhinegraves of Salm.
- When the Nahegau (a countship named after the river Nahe) split into two parts in 1113, the counts of the two parts, belonging to the House of Salm, called themselves Wildgraves and Raugraves, respectively. They were named after the geographic properties of their territories: Wildgrave (German: Wildgraf; Latin: comes sylvanus) after Wald ("forest"), and Raugrave (German: Raugraf; Latin: comes hirsutus) after the rough (i.e. mountainous) terrain.
  - The first Raugrave was Count Emich I (died 1172). The dynasty died out in the 18th century. Charles I Louis, Elector Palatine purchased the estates, and after 1667 accorded the wife and children of his arguably bigamous (morganatic) second marriage to Baroness Marie Luise von Degenfeld, the title of "Raugravine/Raugrave".
- Altgrave (German: Altgraf, "old count") was a title used by the counts of Lower Salm to distinguish themselves from the Wild- and Rhinegraves of Upper Salm, since Lower Salm was the senior branch of the family.

== In Scandinavia ==
The corresponding titles in Scandinavia are greve (m.) and grevinna (f.) and would commonly be used in the third-person in direct address as a mark of courtesy, as in grevinnan.

== Modern usage in German surnames ==
German nobility, although not abolished (unlike the Austrian nobility by the new First Austrian Republic in 1919), lost recognition as a legal class in Germany under the Weimar Republic in 1919 under the Weimar Constitution, article 109. Former hereditary noble titles legally simply transformed into dependent parts of the legal surname (with the former title thus now following the given name, e.g. Otto Graf Lambsdorff). As dependent parts of the surnames (nichtselbständige Namensbestandteile), they are ignored in alphabetical sorting of names, as is any nobiliary particle, such as von or zu, and might or might not be used by those bearing them. The distinguishing main surname is the name following the Graf, or Gräfin, and the nobiliary particle if any. Today, having lost their legal status, these terms are often not translated, unlike before 1919. The titles do, however, retain prestige in some circles of society.

== Other uses ==
The suffix -graf occurs in various office titles which did not attain nobiliary status but were either held as a sinecure by nobleman or courtiers, or functional officials such as the Deichgraf (in a polder management organization).

== See also ==
- History of Germany
- List of German monarchs
- Reichstag (Holy Roman Empire)
- Sendgraf

== Sources and references ==
(incomplete)

- WorldStatesmen: see every modern state; here Germany/Holy Roman Empire
- Arsenyev, Konstantin; Petrushevsky, Fyodor (1893). Brockhaus and Efron Encyclopedic Dictionary (in Russian). Vol. IXА. Гравилат – Давенант. Friedrich A. Brockhaus (Leipzig), Ilya A. Efron (St. Petersburg). pp. 576–577.
