= Altenbamberg =

- Municipality
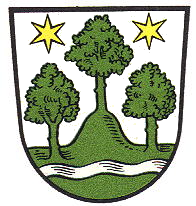
- Coat of arms

- Location of Altenbamberg within Bad Kreuznach district
- Interactive map of Altenbamberg
- Location within Germany Location within Rhineland-Palatinate
- Coordinates: 49°47′12″N 07°49′55″E
- Country: Germany
- State: Rhineland-Palatinate
- District: Bad Kreuznach
- Municipal assoc.: Bad Kreuznach

Government
  - Mayor (2019–24): Holger Markus Conrad

Area
  - Total: 7.53 km^{2} (2.91 sq mi)
- Elevation: 130 m (430 ft)

Population (2025-12-31)
  - Total: 845
  - Density: 112/km^{2} (291/sq mi)
- Time zone: UTC+01:00 (CET)
  - Summer (DST): UTC+02:00 (CEST)
- Postal codes: 55585
- Dialling codes: 06708
- Vehicle registration: KH

Altenbamberg is an Ortsgemeinde – a municipality belonging to a Verbandsgemeinde, a kind of collective municipality – in the Bad Kreuznach district in Rhineland-Palatinate, Germany. It belongs to the Verbandsgemeinde of Bad Kreuznach, whose seat is in the like-named town.

== Geography ==
=== Location ===
The recreational village of Altenbamberg lies in the Alsenz valley on the edge of the North Palatine Uplands at an elevation of 130 m above sea level. The municipal area measures 753 ha, of which 286.5 ha is wooded, 50 ha is used for winegrowing (vineyards) and 226 ha is used for agriculture.

=== Neighbouring municipalities ===
Altenbamberg borders in the north on the town of Bad Münster am Stein-Ebernburg, in the northeast on the town of Bad Kreuznach, in the east on the municipalities of Frei-Laubersheim and Fürfeld, in the south on the municipality of Hochstätten and in the west on the municipality of Feilbingert.

== History ==
The narrow stretch of the Alsenz valley where Altenbamberg now lies is known to have been settled even in prehistoric times. The Stone Age archaeological finds from the Altenbamberg and Neu-Bamberg area have yielded clues as to a settlement here in the New Stone Age. Traces of Bronze Age dwellings have been confirmed in this same area and also near Frei-Laubersheim and Siefersheim (the latter in the neighbouring Alzey-Worms district). It may be assumed that Bronze Age dwellings were represented in the North Palatine-Rhenish-Hessian region rather densely. In 1903, near the Schäferplacken (a wooded area) within Altenbamberg's limits, an archaeological dig at the Hünengräber ("Huns' Graves" – actually barrows) was undertaken with great eagerness. Recovered from this operation were grave goods that were most important to confirming the presence of an Iron Age culture in the area from about 750 to 15 BC. Right from the beginning, Altenbamberg's history has been bound to the castle, Altenbaumburg. This castle, which had its first documentary mention in 1129, was seat to the line of the Raugraves, descendants of the Emichones, who from 960 were counts in the Nahegau. The village's name has nothing to do with the Franconian town of Bamberg, but rather derives from the castle's name. Other names that the village has borne over the ages are as follows:

- 1140: Bomeneburg
- 1181: Boumburg
- 1186: Boimeneburg
- 1325: Burg Alten-Beymborg
- 1391: Alten-Beimborg
- 1394: Alten Beumburg
- 1412: Alten Beinborg
- 1429: Altenbeymburg
- 1444: Alten Baymberg
- 1518: Altenbaumburg
- 1528: Altenbeymburg
- 1681: Altenbaumberg
- 1828: Altenbamberg
- 1837: Altenbaumberg

In 1798, as a result of administrative restructuring in the wake of the French Revolution, Altenbamberg found itself in the Department of Mont-Tonnerre (or Donnersberg in German). After the Congress of Vienna, Altenbamberg passed to the Kingdom of Bavaria where it became part of the Rheinkreis, as the kingdom called the Palatinate, which was now a Bavarian exclave. The village remained with Bavaria until the end of the Second World War. In the course of administrative restructuring in Rhineland-Palatinate, Altenbamberg was transferred in 1969 from the Rockenhausen district (which itself was dissolved) to the Bad Kreuznach district, in which it remains today. With regard to ecclesiastical organization, Altenbamberg belongs as before to the Evangelical Church of the Palatinate and the Roman Catholic Diocese of Speyer.

=== Population development ===
The table shows Altenbamberg's population development. The figures in the table from 1871 to 1987 are based on censuses:

Year	Inhabitants
1815	343
1835	465
1871	559
1905	608
1939	573

Year	Inhabitants
1950	678
1961	617
1970	684
1987	646
2005	806

== Religion ==
As at 31 August 2013, there are 739 full-time residents in Altenbamberg, and of those, 346 are Evangelical (46.82%), 203 are Catholic (27.47%), 1 is Russian Orthodox (0.135%), 1 is Lutheran (0.135%), 26 (3.518%) belong to other religious groups and 162 (21.922%) either have no religion or will not reveal their religious affiliation.

== Politics ==
=== Municipal council ===
The council is made up of 12 council members, who were elected by majority vote at the municipal election held on 7 June 2009, and the honorary mayor as chairman.

=== Mayor ===
Altenbamberg's mayor is Holger Markus Conrad, elected in 2019.

=== Coat of arms ===
The municipality's arms might be described thus: Argent in base ground with a mount in the middle vert upon which and to each side a tree of the same, under the trees a bar wavy of the field and in chief, each side of the middle tree two mullets Or.

The arms violate a traditional rule of heraldry by placing a metal upon another metal (the gold mullets on the silver field).

== Culture and sightseeing ==
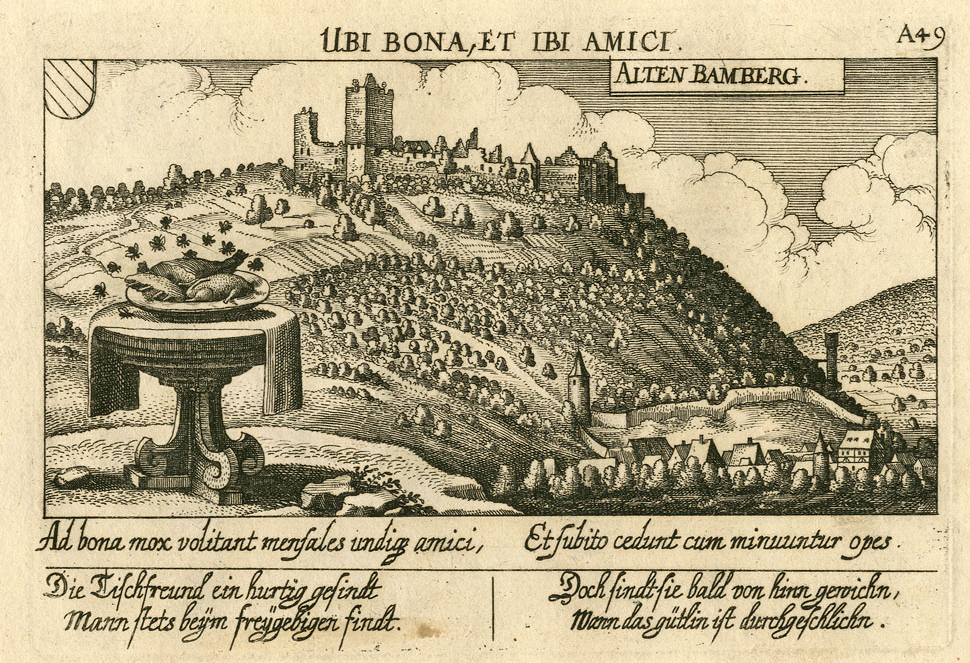
Altenbamberg in the 17th century with Castle Altenbaumburg looming over it

=== Buildings ===
The following are listed buildings or sites in Rhineland-Palatinate's Directory of Cultural Monuments:

- Hauptstraße 39 – Catholic Church of the Nativity of Mary and Saint Maurice (Katholische Kirche Maria Geburt und St. Mauritius); Late Baroque aisleless church, 1783
- Hauptstraße – Protestant church; Classicist aisleless church, 1821–1823
- New Jewish Graveyard (monumental zone) – walled area with 23 gravestones, 1884 to 1937, at the Christian graveyard
- Am Rödelstein – railway station; Gründerzeit building, partly timber-frame, timber-frame goods shed, late 19th century
- Am Rödelstein 2 – villa, about 1860, one-floor addition
- At Burgstraße 4 – house door with fanlight, marked 1809
- Burgstraße 12 (?) – Baroque timber-frame house, marked 1770
- Burgstraße 20 – timber-frame house, Renaissance portal, 16th century, ground floor altered in the 19th century
- Burgstraße 22 – Baroque timber-frame house, 18th century
- Burgstraße 26 – timber-frame house, 18th or early 19th century
- At Burgstraße 27 – spolia marked 1580
- Graveyard – Kastl-Voelker gravestone, façade, relief of a mourner, about 1900
- Old Jewish Graveyard (monumental zone), Am Judengraben/Narrenbrunnen am Schloßberg – area laid out in 1750 with 10 gravestones
- Brücklocherhof, on Kreisstraße 85 – 18th and earlier half of the 19th century; commercial building partly timber-frame
- Am Bernhardsschlößchen – Castle Treuenfels ruin (so-called Bernhardschlößchen), quarrystone walls of castle ruin, 1253; built as free-standing outwork of Castle Altenbaumburg (see next entry)
- Castle Altenbaumburg (monumental zone) – neck ditch and shield wall, rectangular tower, wall remnants 13th century, remnants of Gothic dwelling buildings and the Gothic chapel of the Raugraves' castle seat mentioned in 1129 and fallen into ruin in 1482; the Gothic palas reconstructed in 1981–1983 (see also gallery below)
- Eilbacher Hang – vineyard house; Gründerzeit clinker brick building, about 1890
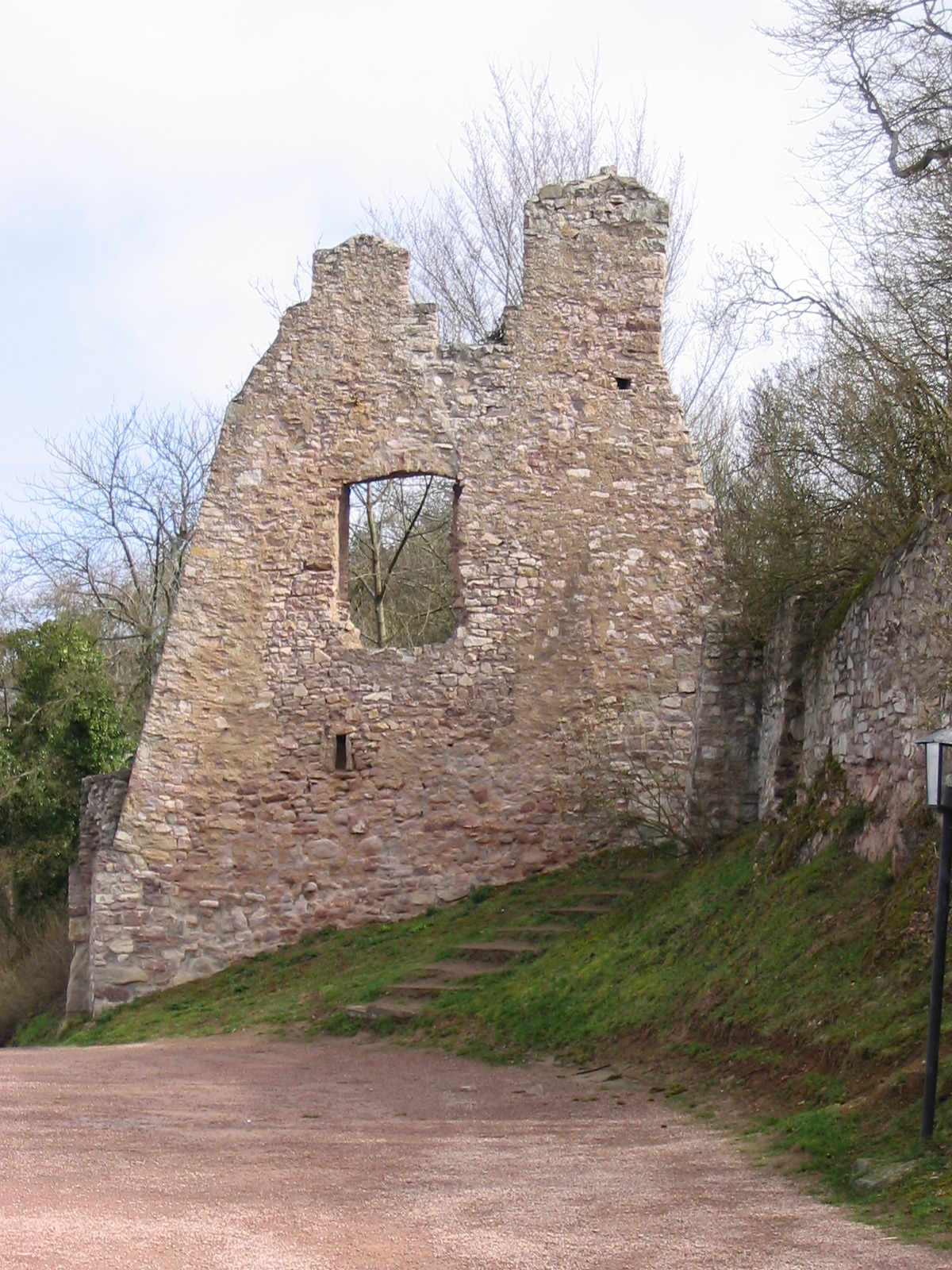
View of the Altenbaumburg towards the way up to the middle bailey from the lower bailey (today the carpark)

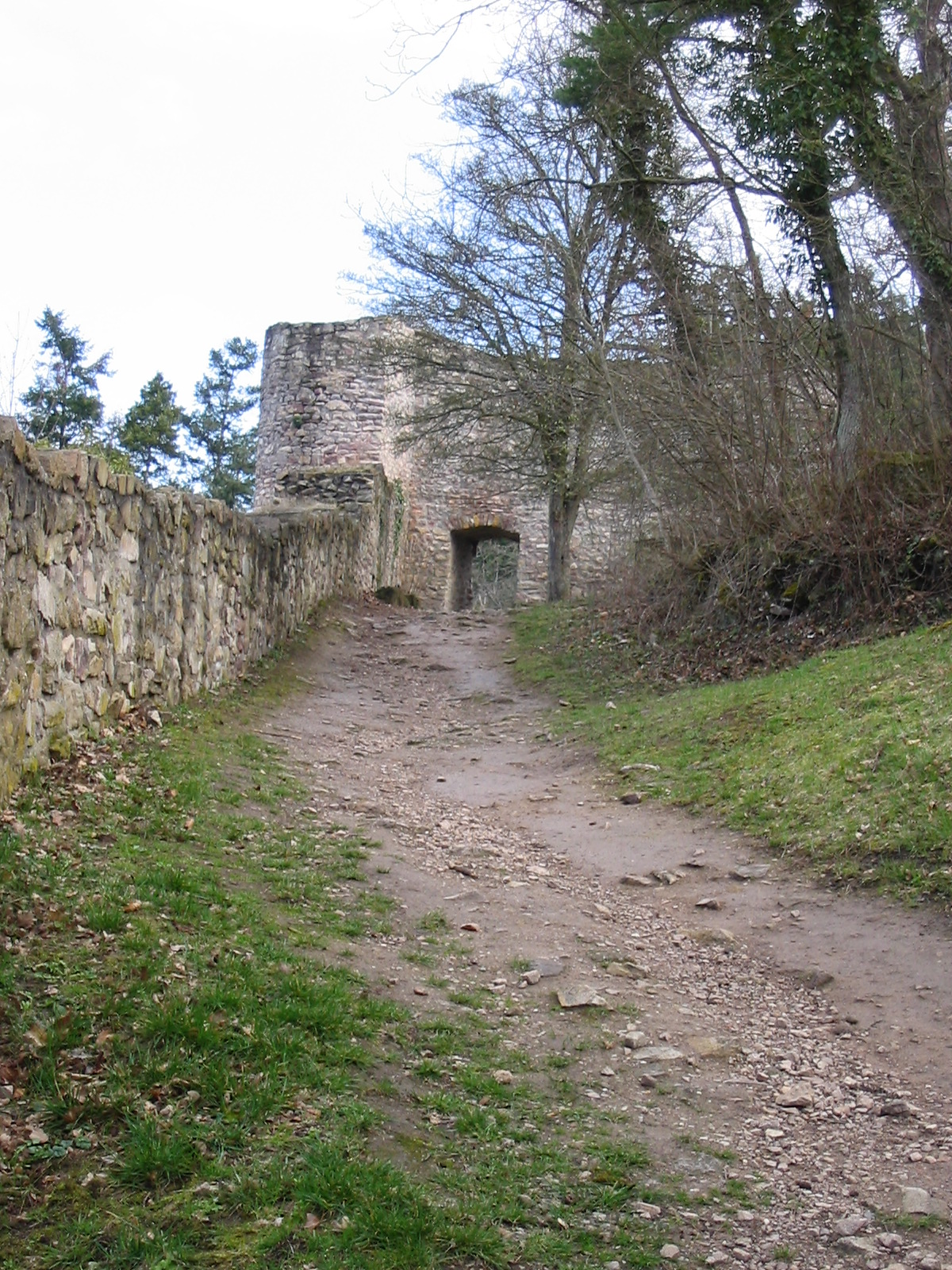
Way by the middle bailey leading to the upper bailey

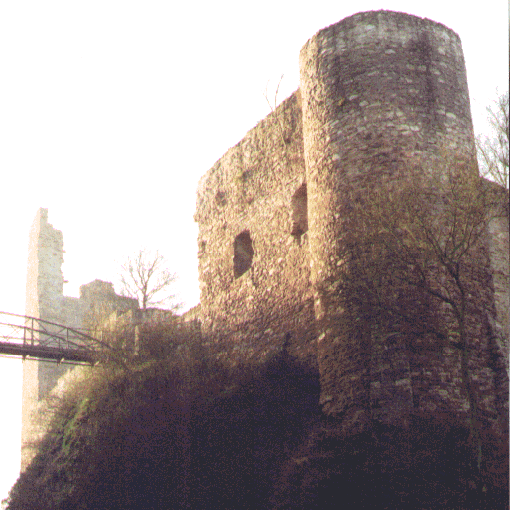
The Altenbaumburg's upper bailey with part of the 19th-century footbridge

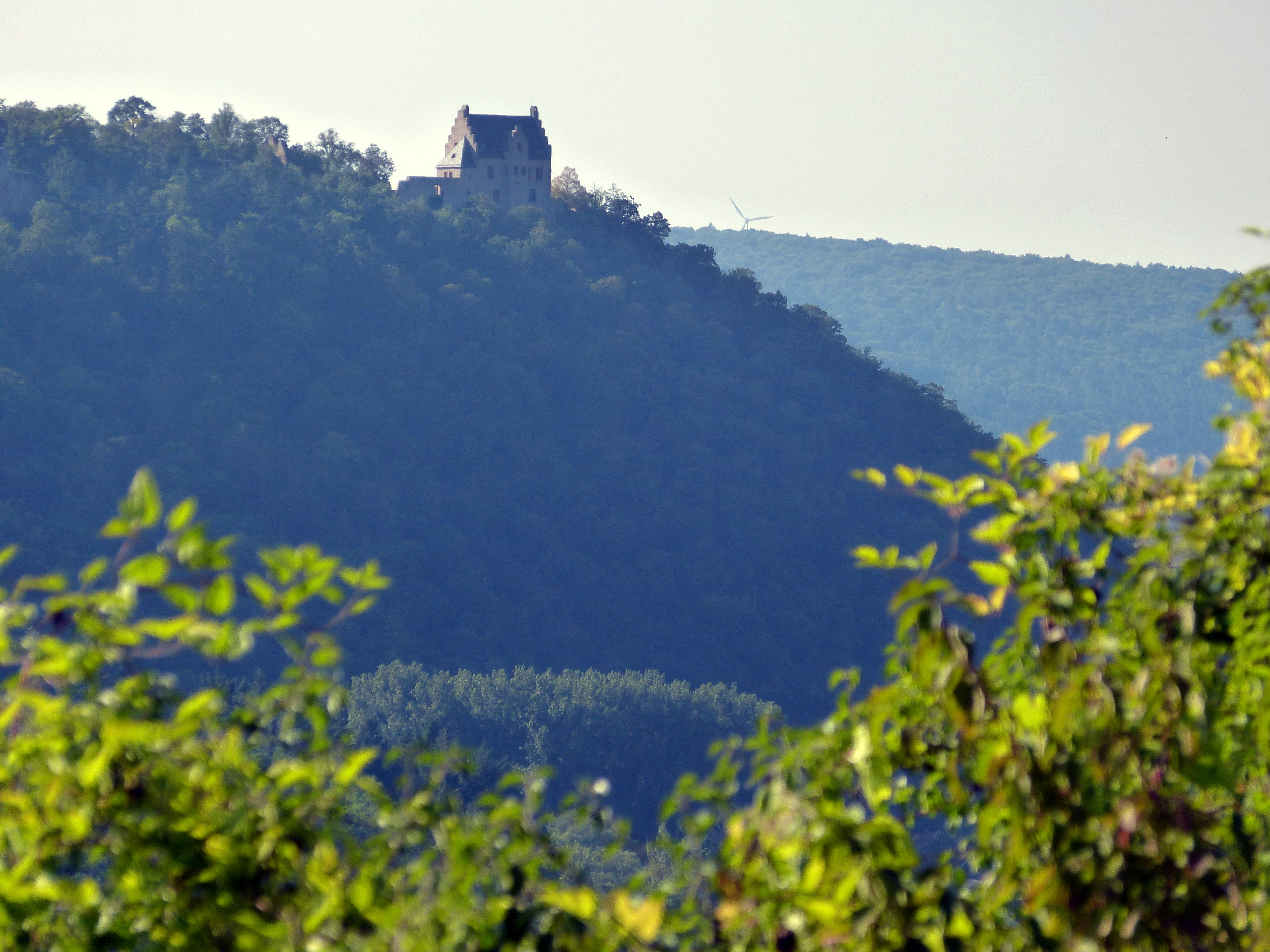
View of the Altenbaumburg across the dale

=== Regular events ===
Many visitors from near and far come each year to the Burgfest ("Castle Festival") to celebrate in a special atmosphere and enjoy the Altenbamberg wine.

=== Sport and leisure ===
Outing destinations are the Altenbaumburg, the Treuenfels (both castle ruins), the Schäferplacken and the Rödelstein. There is an outstanding hiking trail network with a grilling facility and a shelter in wooded surroundings.

== Economy and infrastructure ==
=== Transport ===
Leading through Altenbamberg is Bundesstraße 48. Serving the village is a railway station on the Alsenz Valley Railway (Alsenztalbahn).

=== Economic structure ===
Altenbamberg lies in the Nahe wine region, and still has one full-time winemaker. For the villagers, there are a supermarket and a bakery. Medical services are being taken over mainly by the bordering towns of Bad Münster am Stein-Ebernburg and Bad Kreuznach. There are also "gastronomical" establishments with ten beds.

=== Churches ===
Altenbamberg also has one Evangelical church and one Catholic church, each with weekly services.
