= Altenbaumburg =

Castle in Rhineland-Palatinate, Germany

- Altenbamberg
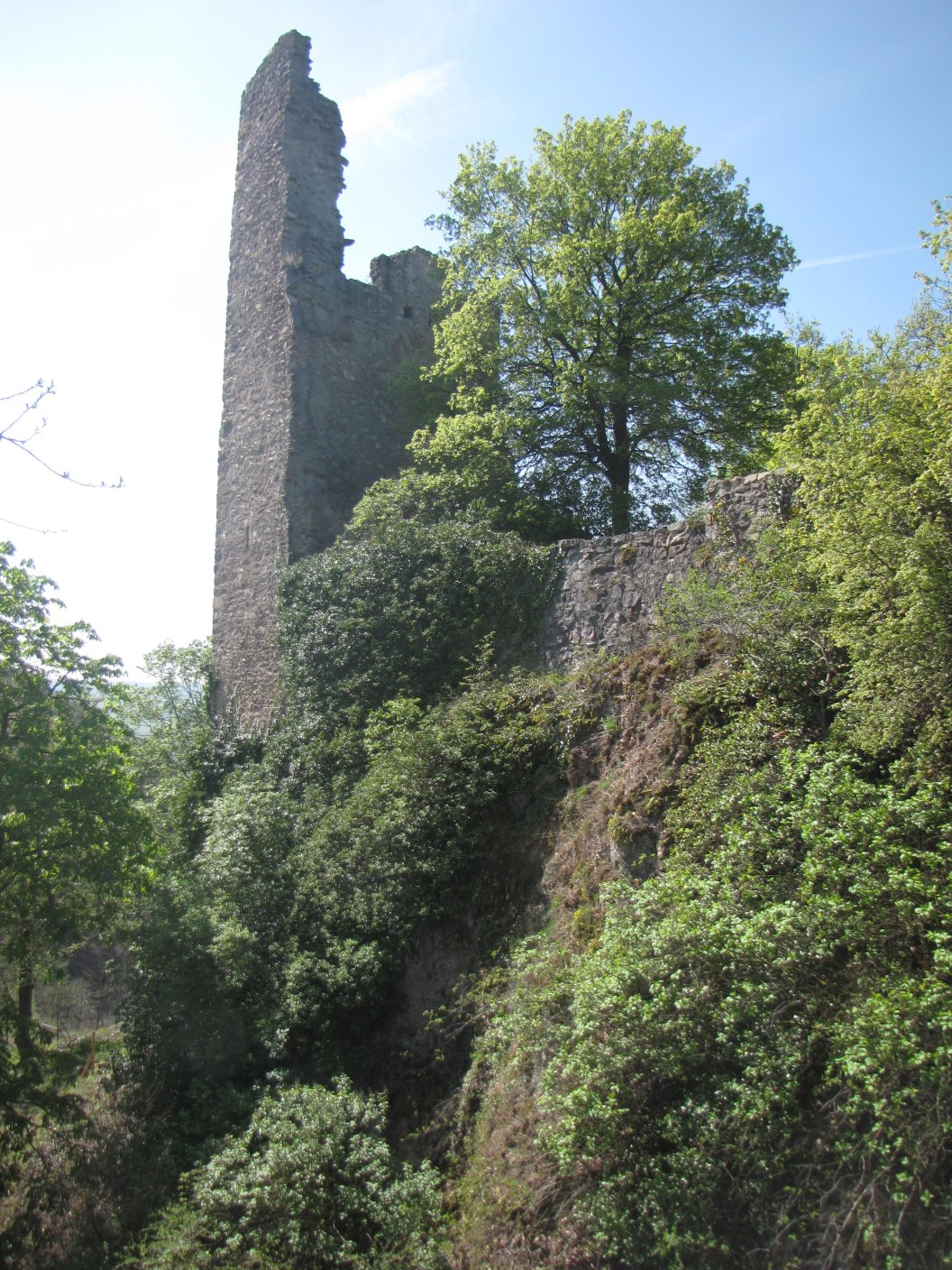

Site information
- Type: Medieval castle

Location
- Coordinates: 49°47′9.6″N 7°50′4.8″E

Site history
- Built: 1253

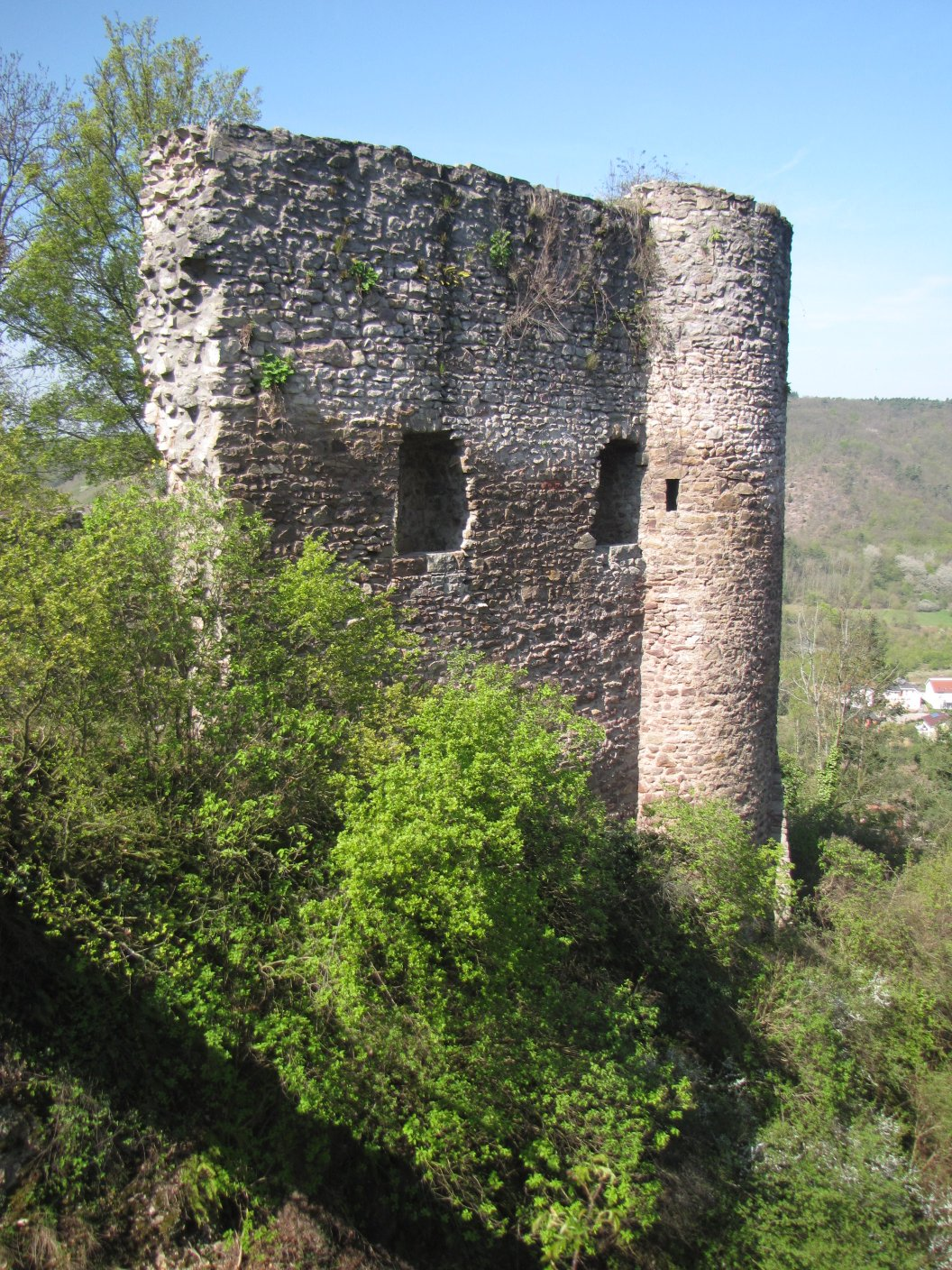

The Burg Altenbaumburg, is a ruined castle above the municipality of Altenbamberg in Rhineland-Palatinate, Germany.
