= Gau-Bischofsheim =

- Municipality
- Coat of arms

- Location of Gau-Bischofsheim within Mainz-Bingen district
- Interactive map of Gau-Bischofsheim
- Location within Germany Location within Rhineland-Palatinate
- Coordinates: 49°54′56″N 8°16′22″E
- Country: Germany
- State: Rhineland-Palatinate
- District: Mainz-Bingen
- Municipal assoc.: Bodenheim

Government
  - Mayor (2019–24): Patric Müller (SPD)

Area
  - Total: 2.84 km^{2} (1.10 sq mi)
- Elevation: 123 m (404 ft)

Population (2025-12-31)
  - Total: 2,105
  - Density: 741/km^{2} (1,920/sq mi)
- Time zone: UTC+01:00 (CET)
  - Summer (DST): UTC+02:00 (CEST)
- Postal codes: 55296
- Dialling codes: 06135
- Vehicle registration: MZ
- Website: www.gau-bischofsheim.de

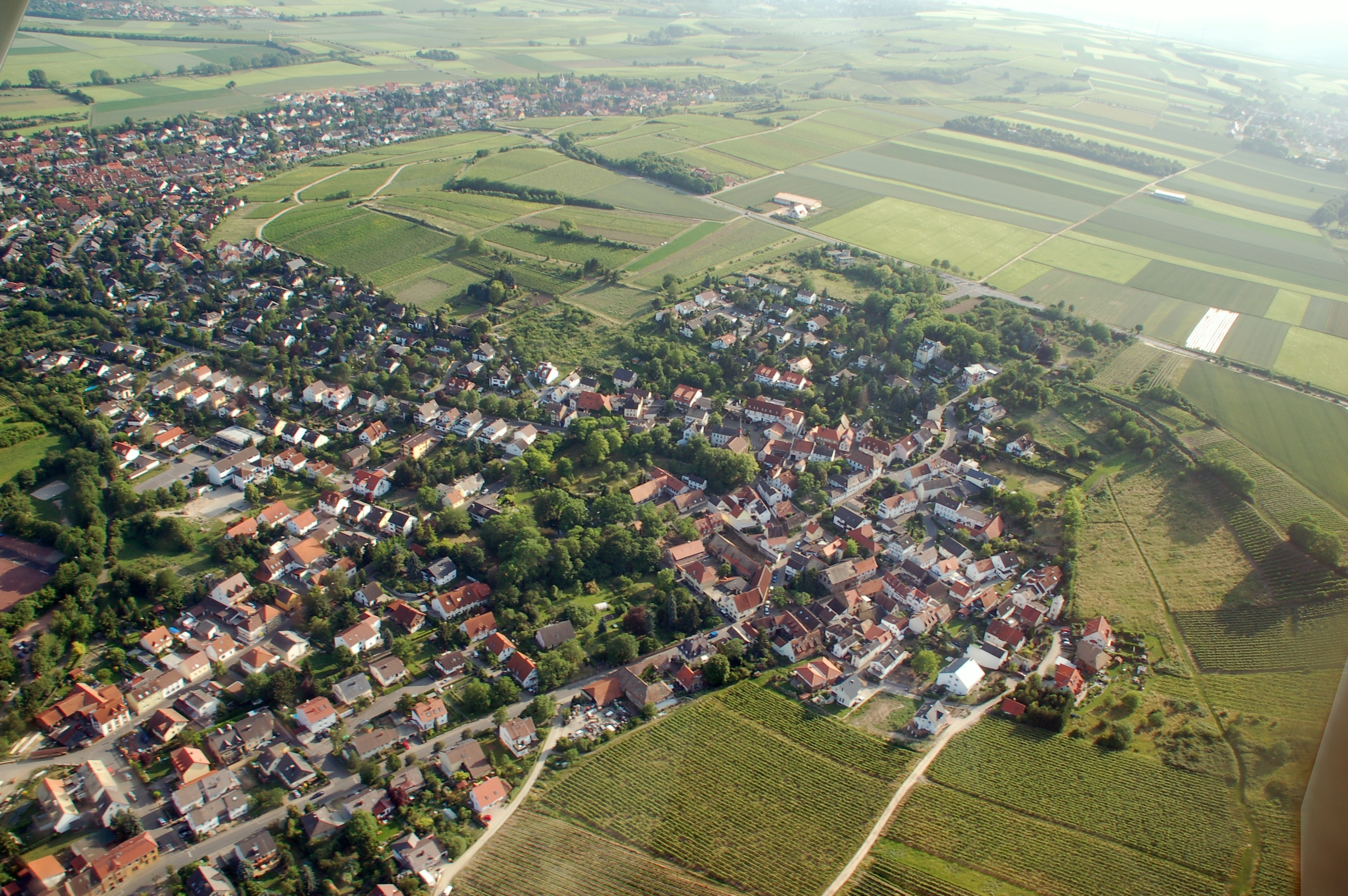
Aerial view 2007

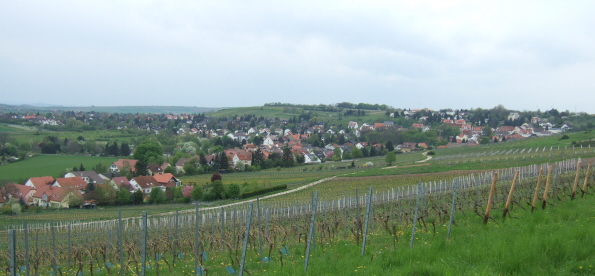
View of Gau-Bischofsheim from the north

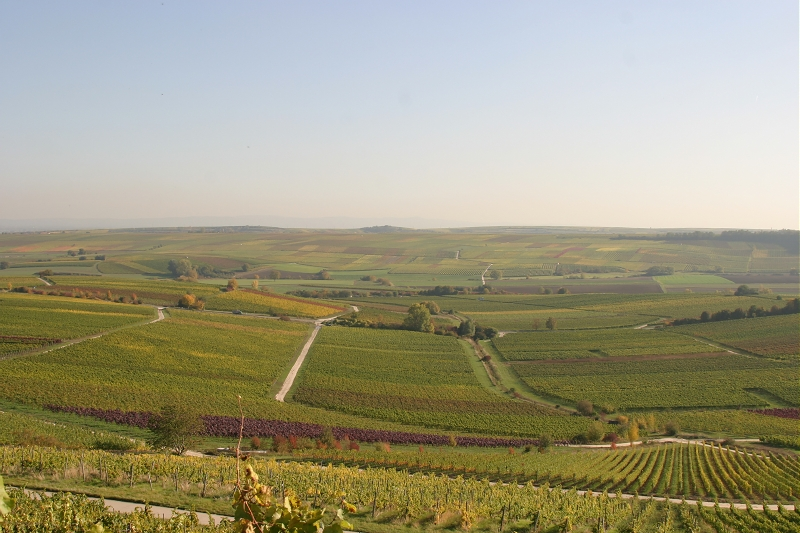
Vineyards near Gau-Bischofsheim

Gau-Bischofsheim German pronunciation: [ɡaʊ ˈbɪʃɔfsˌhaɪm] is an Ortsgemeinde – a municipality belonging to a Verbandsgemeinde, a kind of collective municipality – in the Mainz-Bingen district in Rhineland-Palatinate, Germany.

== Geography ==
=== Location ===
Gau-Bischofsheim is a winegrowing village on Mainz’s southern outskirts. In the local speech the village is called Bischem. The municipality has been characterized by first being so near Mainz and also by the in parts outstanding location of the vineyards. The area under winegrowing cultivation is 76 ha. The Prince-Bishops of Mainz had their wine estates here for time out of mind. Some of the wineries bear witness to this tradition. In more recent times, proximity to Frankfurt, Wiesbaden and Mainz has led to considerable growth in Gau-Bischofsheim. A great number of clubs guide people into working towards the common good. The municipality belongs to the Verbandsgemeinde of Bodenheim, whose seat is in the like-named municipality.

=== Climate ===
The municipality’s location at the foot of the intersection of the eastern and southern slopes of the last rise in the Rhine Terrace sees to it that the climate is temperate with below-average rainfall, without being affected by the drawbacks of the Rhine Basin’s limited air circulation. From Gau-Bischofsheim there is a view all the way to Frankfurt and into the Odenwald. The slope in the north and west shields against winds and guarantees wine.

== History ==
In 769, Gau-Bischofsheim had its first documentary mention. In this document, one Rotbaldus made a donation to the Lorsch Abbey.

=== Amalgamations ===
In the 1969 administrative reform, the Verbandsgemeinde of Bodenheim was formed out of the municipalities of Bodenheim, Gau-Bischofsheim, Harxheim, Lörzweiler and Nackenheim.

== Politics ==
=== Municipal council ===
The council is made up of 17 council members, counting the part-time mayor, with seats apportioned thus:

	CDU	SPD	FDP	FWG	Total
2004	6	6	3	1	16 seats

(as at municipal election held on 13 June 2004)

=== Mayors ===
The mayors (Bürgermeister) of Gau-Bischofsheim since 1945 have been:

- Peter Göth VI 1945–1952
- Karl-Jakob Gerhard 1952–1969
- Karl-Heinz Göth 1969–1989
- Karl-Heinz Behlendorf 1989–1999
- Erich Gröger 1999–2004
- Patric Müller since 2004

=== Coat of arms ===
The municipality's arms might be described thus: Per fess abased, argent two bendlets gules and gules a demi-wheel spoked of three of the first; Wheel of Mainz.

=== Town partnerships ===
- Liernais, Côte-d'Or, France since 1978
- (Germany) Bischofsheim an der Rhön, Rhön-Grabfeld, Bavaria since 2004

The partnership, or twinning, with Liernais in Burgundy is maintained as a token of German-French friendship. Gau-Bischofsheim also has an official partnership arrangement with the Franconian town of Bischofsheim an der Rhön.

== Culture and sightseeing ==
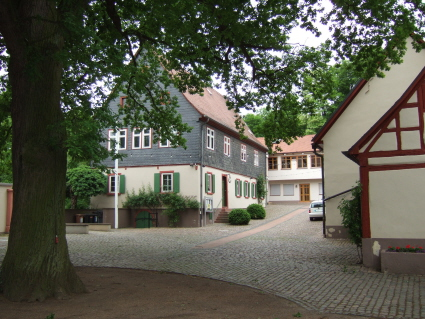
Unterhof in Gau-Bischofsheim

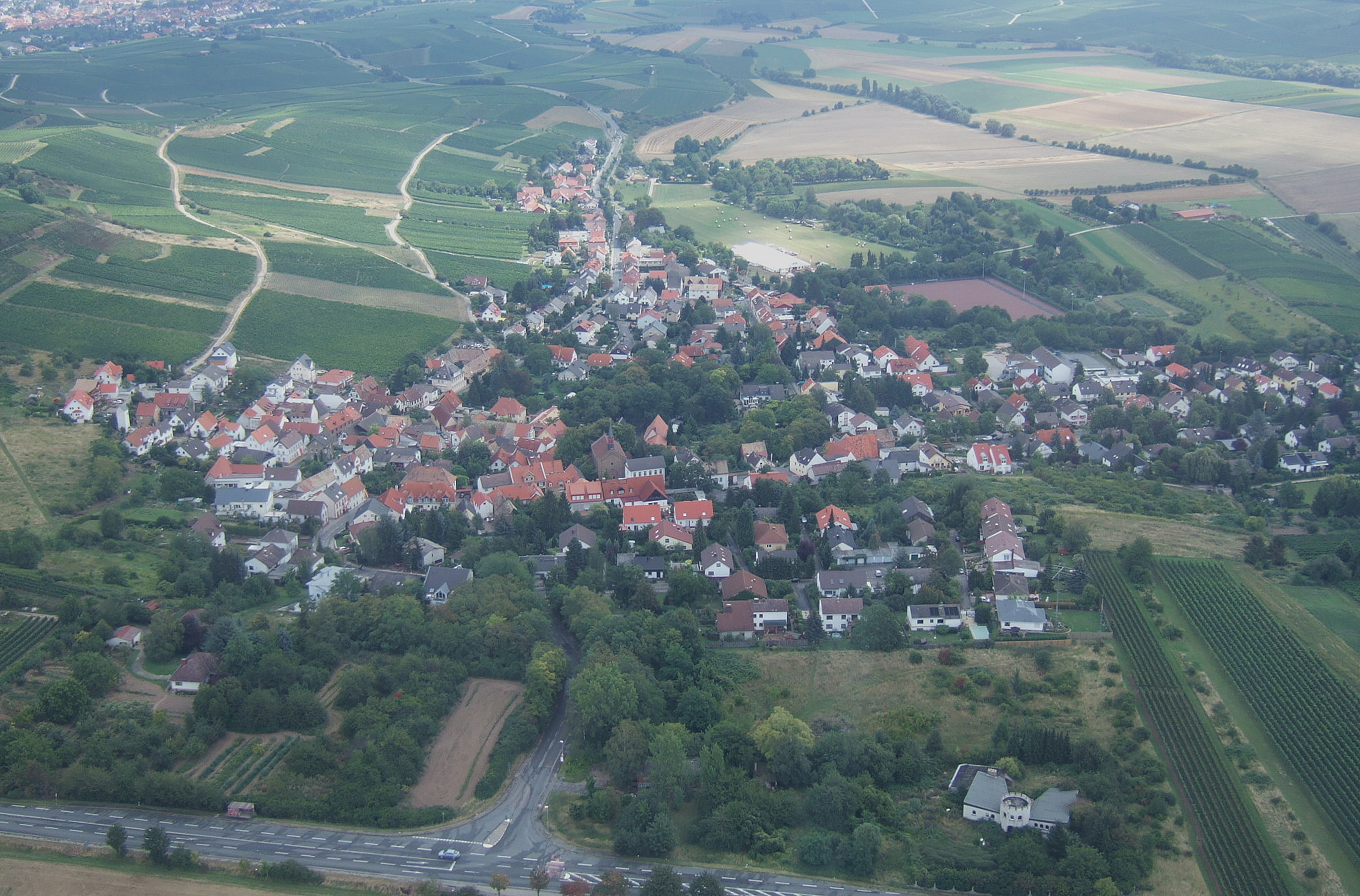
Gau-Bischofsheim from the west

=== Buildings ===
- In the centre of the village lies the Unterhof, a former manor in which are now found the municipal administration, the community centre and the Unterhofkeller (wine cellar). The inner courtyard, sheltered by a huge, ancient oak, offers an ideal venue for summertime festivals and cultural events.
- A particular jewel in the parish church is the famous Geissel organ by Johann Peter Geissel, the oldest organ in the Bishopric of Mainz, which was in Saint Christopher's Church in Mainz until 1773. Regular organ recitals with international artists are among the cultural highlights in village life.

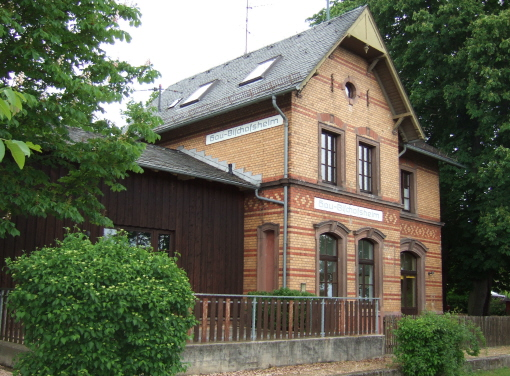
Gau-Bischofsheim's old railway station (today a youth meeting centre)

=== Regular events ===
- The main festivals are Carnival (locally known as Fastnacht) and the kermis (church consecration festival, locally known as the Kerb), in which from Monday to Friday a great part of the village takes part.
- On Wednesdays from 14:00 to 18:00, under the motto vorbeischau’n, babbele, oikaafe (“Look in, have a chat, shop” in dialectal German) since May 2005 there has been a weekly market at the Unterhof.

== Economy and infrastructure ==
=== Transport ===
- The nearest Autobahn interchange is Mainz-Hechtsheim West on the A 60 some 6 km away.
- From 28 September 1896 to 31 May 1985 the Amiche railway line (Alzey-Bodenheim) ran through Gau-Bischofsheim. Today, the tracks have been torn up and the Amiche Cycle Path has been built over parts of the old trackbed. It does not follow the old alignment exactly. The fully signposted cycle path follows the old railway most closely between Bodenheim and Undenheim. From Undenheim on, though, the signposts then guide cyclists onto the path's continuation along the likewise abandoned railway, known as the Valtinche railway, to Nierstein. Coming thence back to the starting point at Bodenheim, the way is identical to the Rheinterrassen-Radweg (Rhine Terrace Cycle Path) and the Rhein-Radweg (Rhine Cycle Path). On the other hand, if one wants to stay on the Amiche path, one must follow the signposts from Undenheim for the Selztal-Radweg (Selz Valley Cycle Path) to Alzey.
