= Worms (electoral district) =

Federal electoral district of Germany

205 Worms
- Electoral district for the Bundestag
- Worms in 2025
- State: Rhineland-Palatinate
- Population: 289,700 (2019)
- Electorate: 211,985 (2025)
- Major settlements: Worms; Alzey; Osthofen
- Area: 932.6 km^{2}

Current electoral district
- Created: 1949
- Party: CDU
- Member: Jan Metzler
- Elected: 2013, 2017, 2021, 2025

Worms is an electoral constituency (German: Wahlkreis) represented in the Bundestag. It elects one member via first-past-the-post voting. Under the current constituency numbering system, it is designated as constituency 205. It is located in eastern Rhineland-Palatinate, comprising the city of Worms, the district of Alzey-Worms, and southern parts of the Mainz-Bingen district.

Worms was created for the inaugural 1949 federal election. Since 2013, it has been represented by Jan Metzler of the Christian Democratic Union (CDU).

== Geography ==
Worms is located in eastern Rhineland-Palatinate. As of the 2021 federal election, it comprises the independent city of Worms, the district of Alzey-Worms, and the Verbandsgemeinden of Bodenheim, Rhein-Selz, and Sprendlingen-Gensingen from the Mainz-Bingen district.

== History ==
Worms was created in 1949. In the 1949 election, it was Rhineland-Palatinate constituency 10 in the numbering system. In the 1953 through 1976 elections, it was number 157. In the 1980 through 1998 elections, it was number 155. In the 2002 election, it was number 209. In the 2005 election, it was number 208. In the 2009 and 2013 elections, it was number 207. In the 2017 and 2021 elections, it was number 206. From the 2025 election, it has been number 205.

Originally, the constituency comprised the city of Worms, and the districts of Landkreis Worms and Alzey as well as the Amtsgerichtsbezirk of Oppenheim from the Landkreis Mainz district. In the 1972 through 2013 elections, it comprised the city of Worms, the district of Alzey-Worms, and the Verbandsgemeinden of Bodenheim, Guntersblum, and Nierstein-Oppenheim from the Mainz-Bingen district. It acquired its current borders in the 2017 election.

Election	No.	Name	Borders
1949	10	Worms	Worms city; Landkreis Worms district; Alzey district; Landkreis Mainz district (only Oppenheim Amtsgerichtsbezirk)
1953	157	Worms	Worms city; Landkreis Worms district; Alzey district; Landkreis Mainz district (only Oppenheim Amtsgerichtsbezirk)
1957	157	Worms	Worms city; Landkreis Worms district; Alzey district; Landkreis Mainz district (only Oppenheim Amtsgerichtsbezirk)
1961	157	Worms	Worms city; Landkreis Worms district; Alzey district; Landkreis Mainz district (only Oppenheim Amtsgerichtsbezirk)
1965	157	Worms	Worms city; Landkreis Worms district; Alzey district; Landkreis Mainz district (only Oppenheim Amtsgerichtsbezirk)
1969	157	Worms	Worms city; Landkreis Worms district; Alzey district; Landkreis Mainz district (only Oppenheim Amtsgerichtsbezirk)
1972	157	Worms	Worms city; Alzey-Worms district; Mainz-Bingen district (only Bodenheim, Guntersblum, and Nierstein-Oppenheim Verbandsgemeinden)
1976	157	Worms	Worms city; Alzey-Worms district; Mainz-Bingen district (only Bodenheim, Guntersblum, and Nierstein-Oppenheim Verbandsgemeinden)
1980	155	Worms	Worms city; Alzey-Worms district; Mainz-Bingen district (only Bodenheim, Guntersblum, and Nierstein-Oppenheim Verbandsgemeinden)
1983	155	Worms	Worms city; Alzey-Worms district; Mainz-Bingen district (only Bodenheim, Guntersblum, and Nierstein-Oppenheim Verbandsgemeinden)
1987	155	Worms	Worms city; Alzey-Worms district; Mainz-Bingen district (only Bodenheim, Guntersblum, and Nierstein-Oppenheim Verbandsgemeinden)
1990	155	Worms	Worms city; Alzey-Worms district; Mainz-Bingen district (only Bodenheim, Guntersblum, and Nierstein-Oppenheim Verbandsgemeinden)
1994	155	Worms	Worms city; Alzey-Worms district; Mainz-Bingen district (only Bodenheim, Guntersblum, and Nierstein-Oppenheim Verbandsgemeinden)
1998	155	Worms	Worms city; Alzey-Worms district; Mainz-Bingen district (only Bodenheim, Guntersblum, and Nierstein-Oppenheim Verbandsgemeinden)
2002	209	Worms	Worms city; Alzey-Worms district; Mainz-Bingen district (only Bodenheim, Guntersblum, and Nierstein-Oppenheim Verbandsgemeinden)
2005	208	Worms	Worms city; Alzey-Worms district; Mainz-Bingen district (only Bodenheim, Guntersblum, and Nierstein-Oppenheim Verbandsgemeinden)
2009	207	Worms	Worms city; Alzey-Worms district; Mainz-Bingen district (only Bodenheim, Guntersblum, and Nierstein-Oppenheim Verbandsgemeinden)
2013	207	Worms	Worms city; Alzey-Worms district; Mainz-Bingen district (only Bodenheim, Guntersblum, and Nierstein-Oppenheim Verbandsgemeinden)
2017	206	Worms	Worms city; Alzey-Worms district; Mainz-Bingen district (only Bodenheim, Rhein-Selz, and Sprendlingen-Gensingen Verbandsgemeinden)
2021	206	Worms	Worms city; Alzey-Worms district; Mainz-Bingen district (only Bodenheim, Rhein-Selz, and Sprendlingen-Gensingen Verbandsgemeinden)
2025	205	Worms	Worms city; Alzey-Worms district; Mainz-Bingen district (only Bodenheim, Rhein-Selz, and Sprendlingen-Gensingen Verbandsgemeinden)

== Members ==
The constituency has been held by the Social Democratic Party (SPD) during all but two Bundestag terms since its creation. It was first represented by Willy Müller from 1949 to 1969. He was succeeded by Willi Fischer from 1969 to 1980. Gernot Fischer then served two terms, followed by Florian Gerster from 1987 to 1994. Klaus Hagemann was representative from 1994 to 2013. Jan Metzler of the Christian Democratic Union (CDU) was elected in 2013, and re-elected in 2017, 2021, and 2025.

Election	Member	Party	%
1949	Willy Müller	SPD	36.6
1953	Willy Müller	SPD	38.7
1957	Willy Müller	SPD	41.0
1961	Willy Müller	SPD	44.1
1965	Willy Müller	SPD	44.9
1969	Willi Fischer	SPD	47.8
1972	Willi Fischer	SPD	54.8
1976	Willi Fischer	SPD	49.8
1980	Gernot Fischer	SPD	51.1
1983	Gernot Fischer	SPD	47.2
1987	Florian Gerster	SPD	44.9
1990	Florian Gerster	SPD	44.6
1994	Klaus Hagemann	SPD	43.7
1998	Klaus Hagemann	SPD	50.0
2002	Klaus Hagemann	SPD	49.1
2005	Klaus Hagemann	SPD	45.8
2009	Klaus Hagemann	SPD	37.6
2013	Jan Metzler	CDU	42.0
2017	Jan Metzler	CDU	41.1
2021	Jan Metzler	CDU	32.2
2025	Jan Metzler	CDU	35.3

== Election results ==
=== 2025 election ===
Federal election (2025): Worms
Notes:	Blue background denotes the winner of the electorate vote. Pink background denotes a candidate elected from their party list. Yellow background denotes an electorate win by a list member, or other incumbent. A ✓ or ✗ denotes status of any incumbent, win or lose respectively.						
Party	Candidate	Votes	%	±%	Party votes	%	±%
CDU	✓ Jan Metzler	62,290	35.3	▲3.2	50,919	28.8	▲6.0
AfD	Thorsten Endreß	35,866	20.3	▲10.6	38,743	21.9	▲11.9
SPD	Markus Trapp	39,042	22.2	▼8.2	33,740	19.1	▼11.0
Greens	Lukas Böhm	13,996	7.9	▼1.8	18,870	10.7	▼1.9
Left	Julia-Christina Stange	8,638	4.9	▲1.8	11,219	6.3	▲3.3
FDP	Konstantin Guntrum	5,171	2.9	▼5.0	8,240	4.7	▼7.5
BSW	Adar Belice	4,401	2.5	New	6,933	3.9	New
FW	Günther Köhler	3,857	2.2	▼1.3	2,888	1.6	▼1.2
Tierschutzpartei					2,282	1.3	▼0.3
Volt	Sabrina Hinz	2,392	1.4	▲0.5	1,523	0.9	▲0.3
PARTEI					789	0.4	▼0.3
Independent	Harald Hösch	602	0.3	New			
BD					262	0.1	New
ÖDP					253	0.1	▼0.1
MLPD					37	<0.1	0.0
Informal votes		1,976			1,533		
Total valid votes		176,255			176,698		
Turnout		178,231	84.1	▲5.8			
CDU hold	Majority	23,248	13.1	▲11.2			

=== 2021 election ===
Federal election (2021): Worms
Notes:	Blue background denotes the winner of the electorate vote. Pink background denotes a candidate elected from their party list. Yellow background denotes an electorate win by a list member, or other incumbent. A ✓ or ✗ denotes status of any incumbent, win or lose respectively.						
Party	Candidate	Votes	%	±%	Party votes	%	±%
CDU	✓ Jan Metzler	52,827	32.2	▼8.9	37,548	22.8	▼9.9
SPD	David Maier	49,748	30.3	▲3.6	49,656	30.1	▲4.8
AfD	Carsten Propp	16,043	9.8	▼1.5	17,033	10.3	▼2.8
Greens	Christian Engelke	15,949	9.7	▲3.0	20,799	12.6	▲4.6
FDP	Manuel Höferlin	12,966	7.9	▲1.9	20,095	12.2	▲1.7
FW	Danniene Wete	5,762	3.5	▲1.9	4,749	2.9	▲1.7
Left	Anja Läwen	5,070	3.1	▼2.0	5,068	3.1	▼3.4
Tierschutzpartei					2,612	1.6	
dieBasis	David Hess	3,134	1.9		2,302	1.4	
PARTEI					1,214	0.7	▼0.2
Volt	Marius Müller	1,367	0.8		926	0.6	
Pirates					890	0.5	▲0.1
Team Todenhöfer					627	0.4	
ÖDP	Marcus Eschborn	726	0.4	▼0.2	456	0.3	▼0.1
Independent	Chiara Pohl	553	0.3				
NPD					264	0.2	▼0.2
Humanists					186	0.1	
V-Partei3					167	0.1	▼0.2
DiB					109	0.1	
LKR					86	0.1	
MLPD					35	0.0	0.0
Informal votes		2,491			1,814		
Total valid votes		164,145			164,822		
Turnout		166,636	78.3	▼1.2			
CDU hold	Majority	3,079	1.9	▼12.5			

=== 2017 election ===
Federal election (2017): Worms
Notes:	Blue background denotes the winner of the electorate vote. Pink background denotes a candidate elected from their party list. Yellow background denotes an electorate win by a list member, or other incumbent. A ✓ or ✗ denotes status of any incumbent, win or lose respectively.						
Party	Candidate	Votes	%	±%	Party votes	%	±%
CDU	✓ Jan Metzler	68,685	41.1	▼0.9	54,721	32.6	▼6.8
SPD	Marcus Held	44,569	26.7	▼10.3	42,471	25.3	▼4.5
AfD	Matthias Lehmann	18,902	11.3	▲7.2	21,978	13.1	▲7.5
Greens	Thomas Rahner	11,280	6.7	▲1.1	13,449	8.0	▼0.3
FDP	Manuel Höferlin	10,058	6.0	▲3.4	17,543	10.5	▲4.5
Left	Sebastian Knopf	8,539	5.1	▲1.4	10,811	6.4	▲1.4
FW	Iris Peterek	2,687	1.6	▲0.3	2,045	1.2	▲0.1
PARTEI					1,623	1.0	
Pirates					780	0.5	▼1.7
ÖDP	Jochen Piehl	1,030	0.6	▲0.2	705	0.4	▲0.1
Independent	Tabitha Elkins	805	0.5				
NPD	Ricarda Riefling	511	0.3	▼1.0	644	0.4	▼1.0
V-Partei³					471	0.3	
BGE					362	0.2	
Independent	Oksana Bauer	110	0.1				
MLPD					62	0.0	0.0
Informal votes		2,617			2,128		
Total valid votes		167,176			167,665		
Turnout		169,793	79.5	▲5.7			
CDU hold	Majority	24,116	14.4	▲9.4			

=== 2013 election ===
Federal election (2013): Worms
Notes:	Blue background denotes the winner of the electorate vote. Pink background denotes a candidate elected from their party list. Yellow background denotes an electorate win by a list member, or other incumbent. A ✓ or ✗ denotes status of any incumbent, win or lose respectively.						
Party	Candidate	Votes	%	±%	Party votes	%	±%
CDU	Jan Metzler	61,337	42.0	▲6.0	57,620	39.4	▲7.0
SPD	Marcus Held	53,948	37.0	▼0.7	43,670	29.8	▲2.8
Greens	Jan Paul Stich	8,111	5.6	▼1.7	12,267	8.4	▼1.7
AfD	Ursula Bieser	6,316	4.3		8,188	5.6	
Left	Sebastian Knopf	5,359	3.7	▼3.4	7,398	5.1	▼3.3
FDP	Manuel Höferlin	3,652	2.5	▼7.2	8,657	5.9	▼9.8
Pirates	Bernhard Furch	2,728	1.9		3,138	2.1	▲0.1
NPD	Mathias Weyerich	2,080	1.4	▼0.8	2,116	1.4	▼0.1
FW	Claus Ableiter	1,810	1.2		1,595	1.1	
REP					544	0.4	▼0.7
ÖDP	Stephan Krell	634	0.4		497	0.3	0.0
Party of Reason					358	0.2	
PRO					269	0.2	
MLPD					41	0.0	0.0
Informal votes		2,953			2,570		
Total valid votes		145,975			146,358		
Turnout		148,928	73.8	▲0.8			
CDU gain from SPD	Majority	7,389	5.0				

=== 2009 election ===
Federal election (2009): Worms
Notes:	Blue background denotes the winner of the electorate vote. Pink background denotes a candidate elected from their party list. Yellow background denotes an electorate win by a list member, or other incumbent. A ✓ or ✗ denotes status of any incumbent, win or lose respectively.						
Party	Candidate	Votes	%	±%	Party votes	%	±%
SPD	✓ Klaus Hagemann	54,255	37.6	▼8.2	39,125	27.1	▼10.9
CDU	Ludwig Tauscher	51,892	36.0	▼1.4	46,831	32.4	▼1.0
FDP	Manuel Höferlin	14,051	9.7	▲3.6	22,748	15.7	▲4.2
Greens	Pia Schellhammer	10,515	7.3	▲3.4	14,609	10.1	▲2.9
Left	Michael Post	10,218	7.1	▲2.5	12,098	8.4	▲3.1
Pirates					2,909	2.0	
NPD	Rainer Marschall	3,259	2.3	0.0	2,284	1.6	▼0.4
REP					1,508	1.0	0.0
FAMILIE					1,468	1.0	▼0.1
ÖDP					425	0.3	
PBC					421	0.3	▼0.1
DVU					137	0.1	
MLPD					30	0.0	0.0
Informal votes		3,191			2,788		
Total valid votes		144,190			144,593		
Turnout		147,381	72.9	▼6.5			
SPD hold	Majority	2,363	1.6	▼6.9			

=== 2005 election ===
Federal election (2005):Worms
Notes:	Blue background denotes the winner of the electorate vote. Pink background denotes a candidate elected from their party list. Yellow background denotes an electorate win by a list member, or other incumbent. A ✓ or ✗ denotes status of any incumbent, win or lose respectively.						
Party	Candidate	Votes	%	±%	Party votes	%	±%
SPD	✓ Klaus Hagemann	70,456	45.8	▼3.3	58,541	37.9	▼3.4
CDU	Ludwig Tauscher	57,443	37.3	▲0.5	51,561	33.4	▼2.5
FDP	Bettina Muth	9,492	6.2	▼2.2	17,740	11.5	▲1.7
Left	Norbert Weber	7,276	3.9	▲2.9	8,176	5.3	▲4.2
Greens	Anton Martensen	5,931	3.9	▼1.8	11,188	7.3	▼1.0
NPD	Rene Rodriguez-Teufer	3,475	2.3		3,021	2.0	▲1.5
Familie					1,678	1.1	
REP					1,647	1.1	▼0.1
PBC					662	0.4	▲0.1
MLPD					100	0.1	
Informal votes		3,841			3,327		
Total valid votes		153,800			154,314		
Turnout		157,641	79.4	▼1.3			
SPD hold	Majority	13,013	8.5				
