= Hipping =

Vineyard

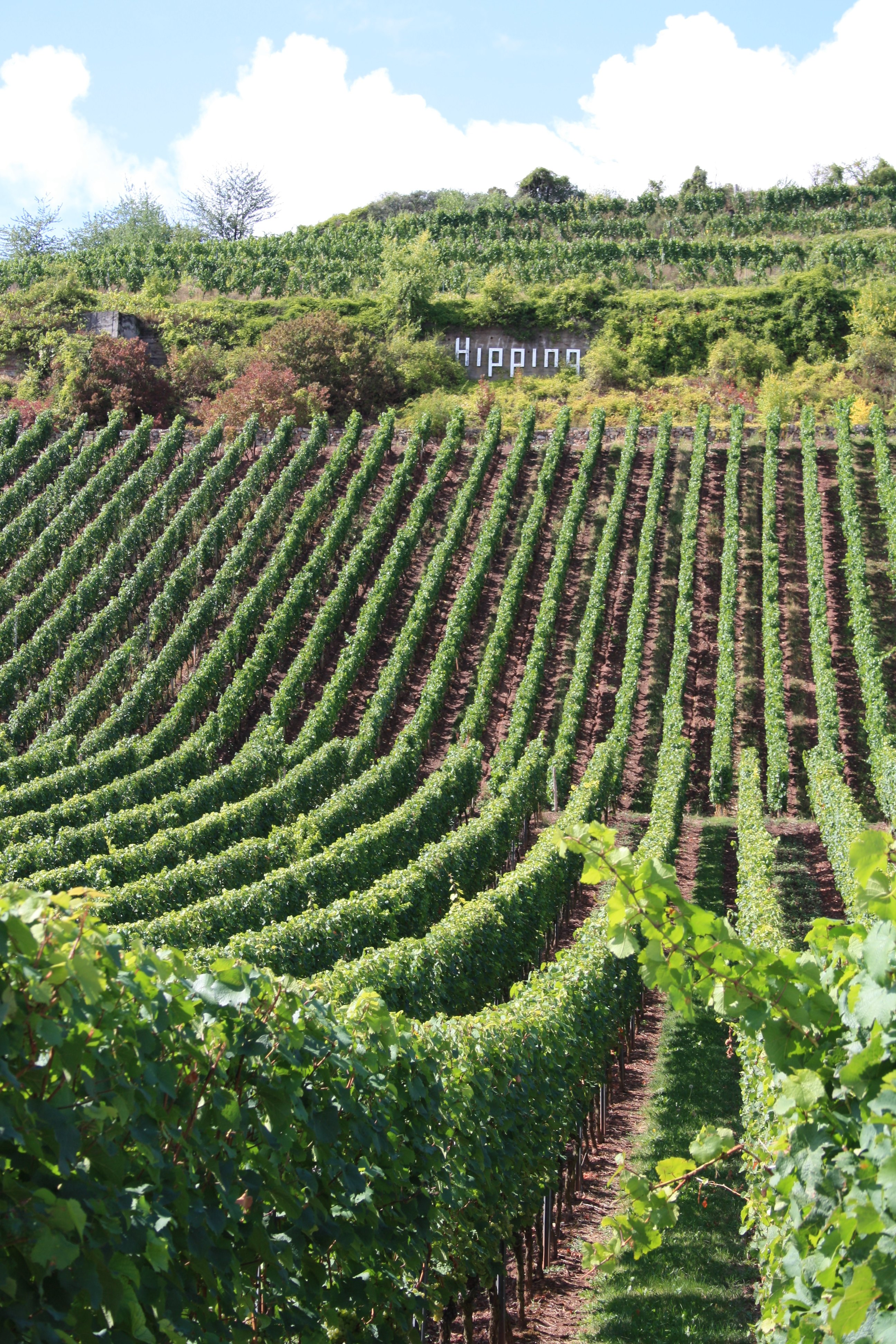
Hipping

Hipping

Hipping is a 23-hectare-sized (57-acre) vineyard of the Roter Hang, 'red slope' in the municipality Nierstein in Germany. Located at the Rhenish Hessian Rhineterrace (Rhineland-Palatinate), wines of this vineyard can be marketed as Großes Gewächs, 'big growth' or Erste Lage, 'first position', provided that other quality characteristics are fulfilled.

== Terrain ==
The Hipping vineyard extends along the Rhine north of Nierstein and south of Nackenheim. It is part of the large vineyard Rehbach of the Rheinhessen wine region and surrounds the exclusive site "Brudersberg" in southern direction and borders in the south on the location "Ölberg". The location is 90–160 m above NN. The slope gradient is up to 70% and the exposure to southeast, the incoming morning sun is particularly beneficial for Riesling. The soil is Rotliegend.

Due to its proximity to the Nierstein village centre, the Hipping is a frequently used area for wine festivals, in particular for the event "Weinpräsentation am Roten Hang" (Wine Presentation on the Red Slope) and vineyard tours of the local winegrowers.

== Etymology ==
The name of the location could be derived from the Middle High German "Hübel" for "hill" or from the tool "Hippe" for billhook. The interpretations are complex and ambiguous.

== History ==
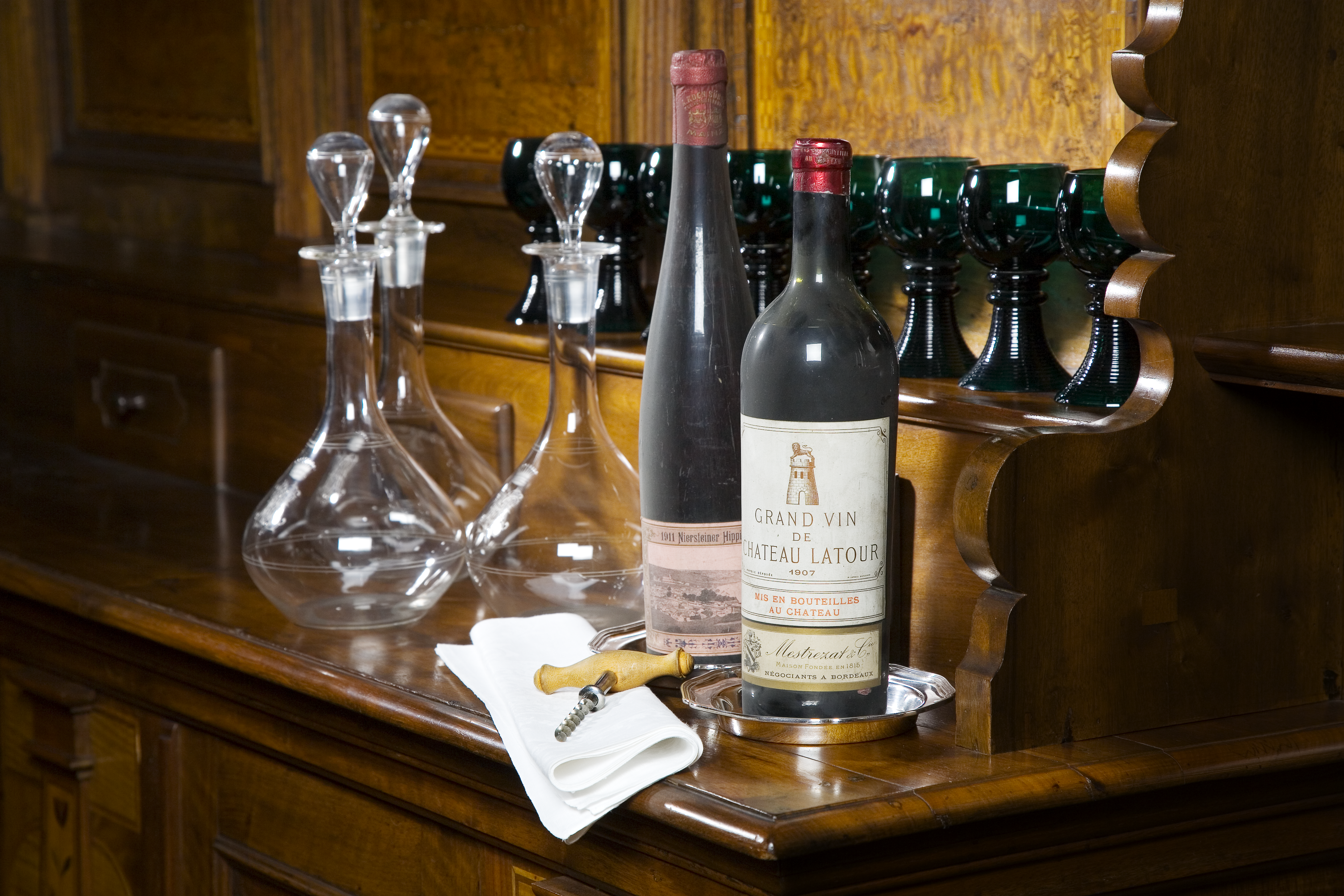
Wine on a sideboard from the Exhibition "Taste of bygone times" in 2007 in Stockholm. One bottle each of “Château Latour” vintage 1907 & “Niersteiner Hipping” vintage 1911.

The coronation of Queen Elizabeth II on 2 June 1953 was celebrated with a Riesling by Franz Karl Schmitt from this vineyard. A 2012 vintage Hipping Riesling of the winery Klaus Peter Keller, who had acquired exactly in 2010 the plot in the Hipping therefore became the official wine for the Diamond Jubilee of Elizabeth II, which the Queen celebrated in 2012.

== Property ==
Propertied in the Hipping are the VDP wineries St. Antony, Gunderloch and Klaus Peter Keller, as well as the wineries Georg Albrecht Schneider, J. & H.A. Strub, Schätzel and many more.
