= Florian Gerster =

German politician

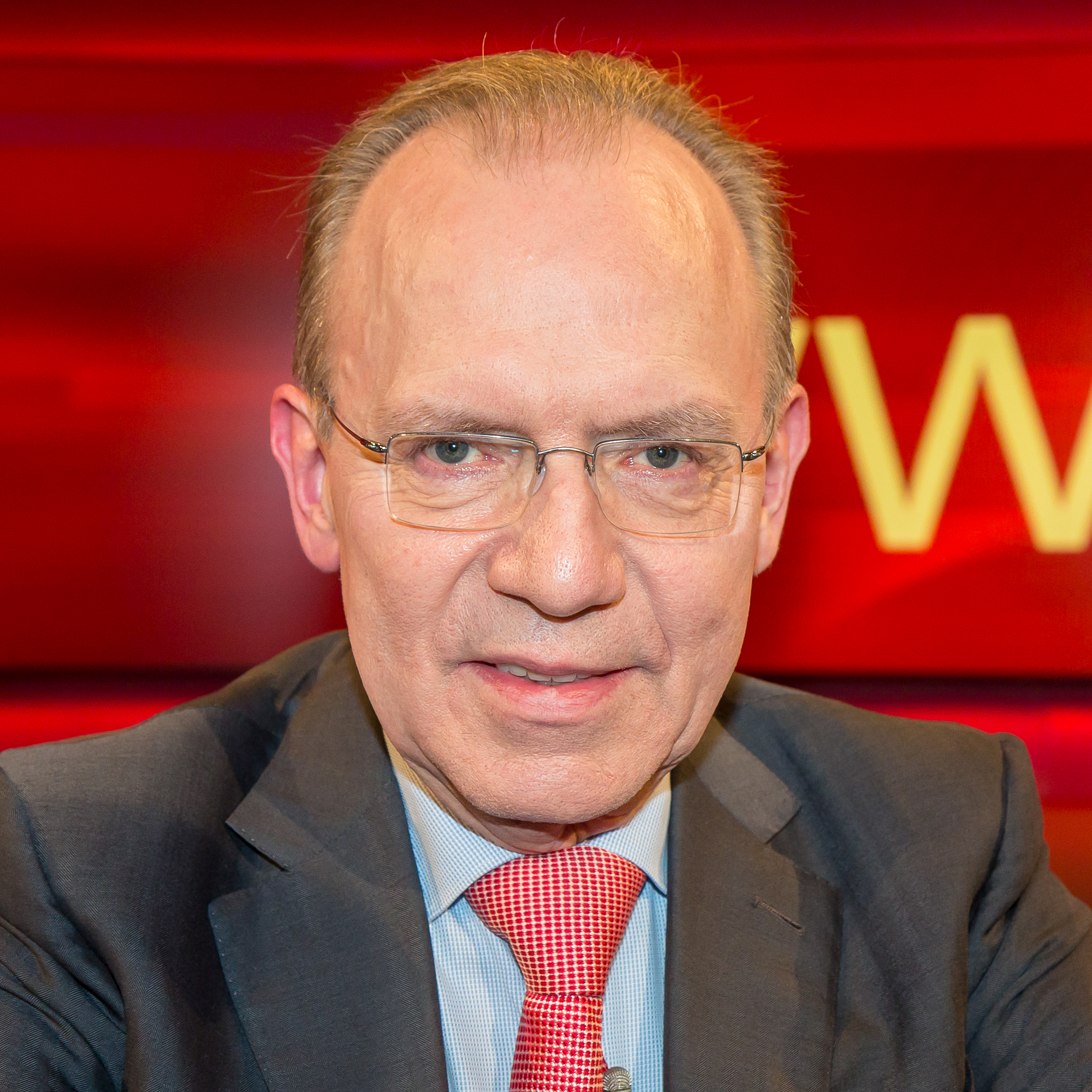
Florian Gerster, 2017

Florian Gerster (born 7 May 1949 in Worms, Germany) is a German politician and former government official.

After his graduation, he served in the military and earned a master's degree in psychology at the University of Mannheim. In 1977, he was elected to the Diet of Rhineland-Palatinate and entered the German Bundestag in 1987, representing Worms. From 1991 onwards, he was appointed Minister for Federal and European Affairs and thereafter Minister of Labor of Rhineland Palatinate. From 2002 until his resignation in 2004, he served as President of the Federal Employment Agency of Germany. Today, Gerster is a senior lecturer at the German University of Administrative Sciences Speyer and works as a freelance management consultant. He is the brother of ZDF heute news speaker Petra Gerster.
