= Weingut St. Antony =

German wine estate

St. Antony
- Location: Nierstein, Germany
- Other labels: Heyl zu Herrnsheim
- Founded: 1918
- First vintage: 1920
- Key people: Dirk Würtz
- Parent company: Detlev Meyer (private)
- Cases/yr: 14600 (only St. Antony)
- Varietals: Riesling, Silvaner, Pinot blanc, Pinot noir, Dornfelder
- Distribution: international
- Website: www.st-antony.de

Weingut St. Antony

St. Antony is a wine estate in the Rheinhessen wine-growing region in Germany, that has been making wine since the end of the First World War.

The small-scale craft winery is located in Nierstein on the Rhine and owns around 26 hectares of vineyards. It is member of the Verband Deutscher Prädikatsweingüter (VDP).

== History ==
In 1912 the Gutehoffnungshütte (later MAN AG) purchased a lime pit in the south of Nierstein including the neighbouring vineyards. The limestone is needed as raw material for the production in the ironworks of Oberhausen (Ruhr Area). After the First World War the demand for limestone decreased drastically and the management decided to use the purchased area for viticulture. In 1920 the first vintage was vinified. The wines of the estate "Gutehoffnungshütte" were consumed only within the company or donated, later sold, to key customers. The lime pit was sold in 1955, with the proceeds reinvested in the winery. As part of this transaction, top Nierstein vineyard sites were purchased and became assets of the estate and the oenological equipment was modernized.

In the 1980s the corporate structure was changed and the Gutehoffnungshütte ran under the MAN label. Also the Weingut received a new name in 1995 and is called Weingut St. Antony, after the first ironworks, St.-Antony-Hütte, in Oberhausen.

The responsibility for the winery had been directly located at the corporate management, chief oenologist was Alexander Michalsky. During this time St. Antony gathered a place in the top 100 wineries in Germany.

In 2005 Detlev Meyer, a private investor who is a textile merchant, acquired the estate. Since July 2008 another top Nierstein winery "Heyl zu Herrnsheim", with another 13 hectares, was long time rented by Meyer and merged with St. Antony. The winemaking of both is located now in the former Gustav Adolf Schmitt winery. Between 2005 and 2018, the Geisenheimer Felix Peters Chief was the chief oenologist for both estates. Since 2019, Dirk Würtz has been managing the wineries as a partner and chief oenologist.

== Geography ==
The estate stretches across the so-called "Roter Hang" (red slope) with steep slope viticulture and presence of red slate in Nierstein and comprises part of the top vineyard sites "Orbel", "Pettenthal", "Hipping" and "Ölberg". The "Brudersberg" site is in exclusive possession of "Heyl zu Herrnsheim". St. Antony's vineyards in the Rheinhessen wine region are within the boundaries of the collective sites (Großlagen) of Spiegelberg, Rehbach and Auflangen, which are not displayed on the label. The basic wines are simply labelled with grape variety and estate name. Only the Erstes Gewächs designation which claim to be highly "terroir-expressive", display the Lage on the label.

== Visitors ==
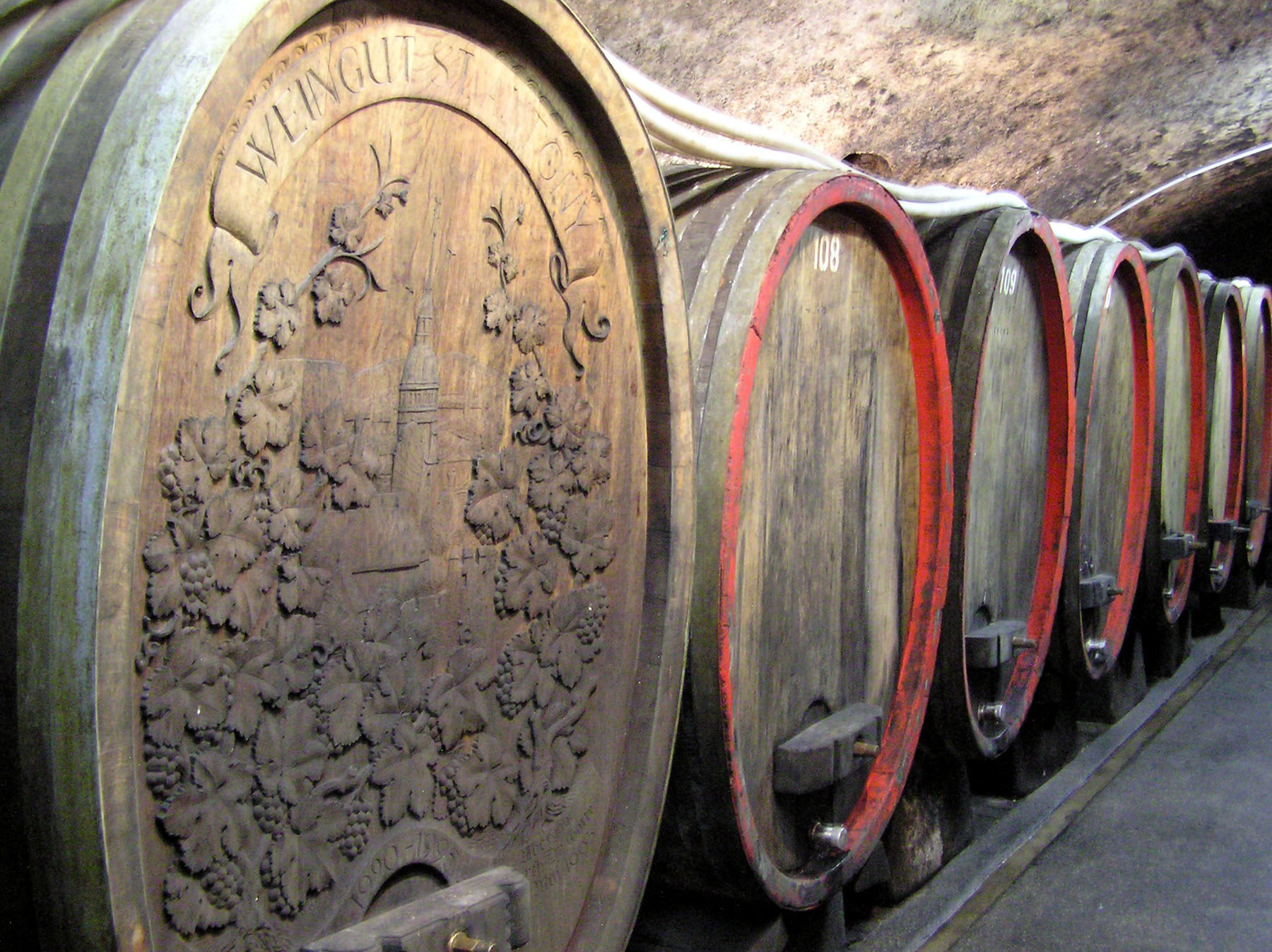
Jubilee cask 1995

The estate is not open to the public.

== Assessment ==
- Jancis Robinson ranks the winery among the 30 best wineries in Germany
- Weingut St. Antony was awarded four stars in Eichelmann Deutschlands Weine 2009
