= Manuel Höferlin =

German politician (born 1973)

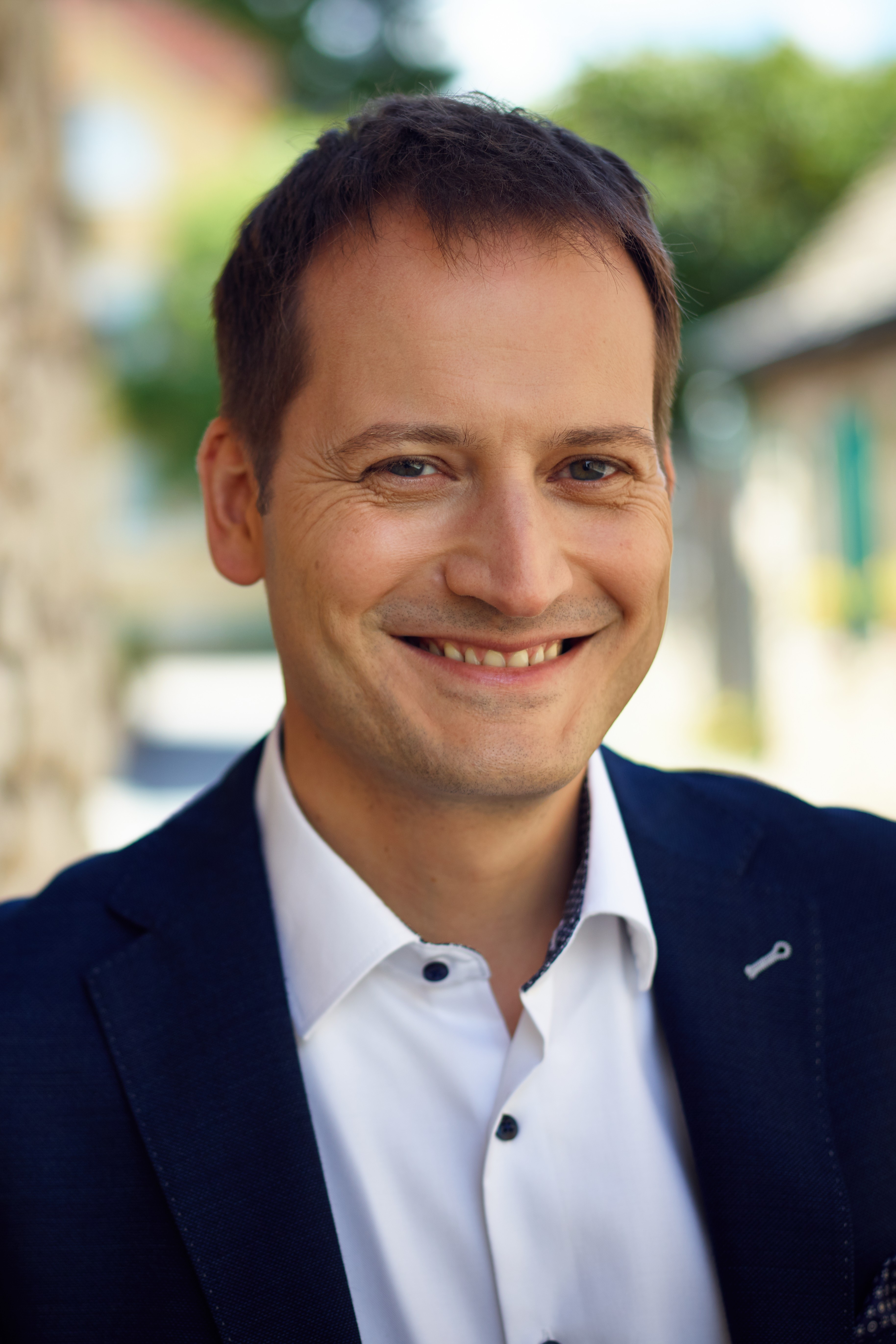
- Manuel Höferlin in 2017

Member of the Bundestag
- In office 2017–2025
- In office 2009–2013

Personal details
- Born: 6 February 1973 (age 53) Paris
- Party: FDP
- Children: 3
- Education: University of Mainz

Manuel Höferlin (born 6 February 1973) is a German politician of the Free Democratic Party (FDP) who served as a member of the Bundestag from the state of Rhineland-Palatinate from 2009 to 2013 and from 2017 to 2025.

== Early life and career ==
Höferlin was born in Paris and moved to Harxheim in Rheinhessen at the age of five. In 1992, he graduated from the Gutenberg-Gymnasium in Mainz and subsequently studied law at the University of Mainz. While still a student, he went into business for himself, founded an IT consulting company in 1997, and took a stake in a management consultancy, where he was managing director until early 2009.

== Political career ==
In 2005, Höferlin joined the FDP. From 2009 to 2013, he was a member of the Bundestag for the first time, representing the Worms district. During that time, he served on the Committee on Internal Affairs and the Committee on Legal Affairs. Due to the failure of his party to reach the five percent hurdle in the 2013 federal elections, he resigned from the Bundestag.

Höferlin became a member of the Bundestag again in the 2017 German federal election. In parliament, he served on the Committee on Internal Affairs and the Committee on the Digital Agenda, which he chaired from 2019 to 2021. He was also his parliamentary group's spokesman for digital policy (2018–2021) and internal affairs (2021–2025).

In the negotiations to form a so-called traffic light coalition of the Social Democratic Party (SPD), the Green Party and the FDP following the 2021 German elections, Höferlin was part of his party's delegation in the working group on digital innovation and infrastructure, co-chaired by Jens Zimmermann, Malte Spitz and Andreas Pinkwart.

In November 2024, Höferlin announced that he would not stand in the 2025 federal elections but instead resign from active politics by the end of the parliamentary term.

== Life after politics ==
After leaving parliament, Höferlin joined French information technology (IT) services and consulting company Capgemini in 2025.

== Other activities ==
- Foundation for Data Protection, Member of the Advisory Board (2022–2025)
