= Nackenheim =

Municipality in Rhineland-Palatinate, Germany

- Municipality
- Coat of arms

- Location of Nackenheim within Mainz-Bingen district
- Interactive map of Nackenheim
- Location within Germany Location within Rhineland-Palatinate
- Coordinates: 49°55′47″N 8°20′48″E
- Country: Germany
- State: Rhineland-Palatinate
- District: Mainz-Bingen
- Municipal assoc.: Bodenheim

Government
  - Mayor (2024–29): René Adler (FW)

Area
  - Total: 8.62 km^{2} (3.33 sq mi)
- Elevation: 84 m (276 ft)

Population (2025-12-31)
  - Total: 5,387
  - Density: 625/km^{2} (1,620/sq mi)
- Time zone: UTC+01:00 (CET)
  - Summer (DST): UTC+02:00 (CEST)
- Postal codes: 55299
- Dialling codes: 06135
- Vehicle registration: MZ
- Website: www.nackenheim.de

Nackenheim (German pronunciation: [ˈnakn̩haɪm]) is an Ortsgemeinde – a municipality belonging to a Verbandsgemeinde, a kind of collective municipality – and a winegrowing centre in the Mainz-Bingen district in Rhineland-Palatinate, Germany.

== Geography ==
=== Location ===
Nackenheim lies in Rhenish Hesse near Mainz. It belongs to the Verbandsgemeinde of Bodenheim, whose seat is in the like-named municipality, and is the only Ortsgemeinde in this Verbandsgemeinde that lies right on the Rhine. It is a municipality idyllically set between hillside vineyards on the one side and the Rhine on the other, whose vineyards were first mentioned more than 1,200 years ago. The islands of Kisselwörth (35 ha) and Sändchen cut Nackenheim off from the Rhine's mainstream. The two islands have conservation status and belong to the Rheinauen ("Rhine Floodplains") Habitats Directive area. Formerly, the area was under cultivation, but nowadays, meadow orchards (Streuobstwiesen) are found there. In the course of the Rhine straightening project in the 19th century, Kisselwörth and Sändchen were enlarged with landfill and current control works.

=== Neighbouring municipalities ===
Nackenheim's neighbours are Bodenheim, Nierstein, Lörzweiler and Trebur.

== History ==
Chronology	
2200 BC	New Stone Age village of the Rössen culture in the Fruchtgewann (cadastral area) in the Nackenheim municipal area
1200 BC	Urnfield on the Oppenheimer Berg (mountain) witnesses Bronze Age settlement in the municipal area
600 BC	In the Late Iron Age, a Hallstatt culture settlement exists on the Vogelsreich (cadastral area)
250	Roman villae rusticae in the Rudelheck and Thierhäupter cadastral areas
580	Frankish grave finds from these years An der Heidenpforte (cadastral area) confirm the village's founding in the lower Eichelbach valley
630	The Frankish village is split from the Imperial estate by royal donation and ends up in the ownership of the Bishopric of Cologne
772	First document about Nacheim, made out at the Lorsch Abbey
early 8th century	The Archbishop of Cologne donates his holdings in Nackenheim to the newly founded Saint Gereon’s Monastery
1024	Emperor Conrad II’s election on the Königsstuhl (mountain)
1100	Sunsweiler and Albisheim are hamlets within the Nakheimer Mark, although both later vanish.
1258	Nachenn passes from Saint Gereon’s Monastery in Cologne to Saint Stephen’s Monastery in Mainz
14th to 16th century	From the resident knightly nobility come important priests (Godefried von Nacknheim, Vicar of Saint Stephen’s, Herbord von Nackheim, Cantor of the Teutonic Knights in Mainz, among others)
1615	Nackenheim is placed under the Elector of Mainz
1714	In a treaty between Electoral Mainz and the Electorate of the Palatinate the alignment of the Mainz state border was set south of Nackenheim. In Nackenheim there is a customs station (the one where Prof. Pierplatz stayed until 1938).
1792/1793	The populace takes the oath of French citizenship in the "Nackenheim Revolution"
1816	Nackenheim passes to the Grand Duchy of Hesse-Darmstadt. The 12 floodplains on the Rhine's right bank are lost

=== The name Nackenheim ===
The actual derivation of the name Nackenheim is not known. One supposition holds that the name goes back to prehistoric Nackenheim and a chieftain named Nacho, yielding a name meaning "Nacho’s Home". Another explanation that has developed in the course of history according to which the name derives from the place's location in the "neck of the mountain" (in German: im Nacken des Berges). Thus far, neither theory has been confirmed.

== Politics ==
=== Town council ===
The council is made up of 22 council members, counting the part-time mayor, with seats apportioned thus:

	CDU	SPD	FWG	FDP	Total
2024	5	4	13	-	22 seats

(as at municipal election held on 9 June 2024)

=== Mayor ===
In May 2019, René Adler was elected as Nackenheim's mayor.

=== Coat of arms ===
The municipality's arms might be described thus: A bar argent, in chief sable an orb of the first, in base a wheel spoked of six of the first.

In an expert's report from 25 May 1984, Chief Archivist Dr. Debus from the Speyer State Archive (Landesarchiv Speyer) made the following remarks:

"Above the Nackenheim Town Hall entrance is found an arms stone, which deviates from the arms in question on the following points: Instead of the cross, a hook with a pointed angle adorns the globus cruciger, and the wheel is eight-spoked. … The keystone above the Town Hall entrance yields, surely in unwitting transformation, the always six-spoked Wheel of Mainz, for it could only be this, with eight spokes. As to the other, the meaning of the Imperial apple (Reichsapfel – the globus cruciger) was unclear. Demandt-Renkhoff (Hessisches Ortswappenbuch, 1956, S. 124 f) state that the Wheel of Mainz originally replaced seal representations of Saint Stephen’s stoning – a reference to Saint Stephen’s Monastery in Mainz as patronage lords of Nackenheim’s Saint Gereon’s Church. Likewise, the municipal sign with Stephen’s stoning in it, which at first looked more like a Sester, underwent a gradual shift to a globus cruciger, which is why this form is used in the current municipal arms. The colours black and red, suggested by Demandt-Renkhoff and now also widespread, were retained, but on heraldic grounds and following the keystone already named several times furnished with a stripe, whose silver colour together with the red in the lower half of the escutcheon refers to Electoral Mainz.

"The arms are historically well founded and heraldically flawless; their approval is recommended."

=== Town partnerships ===
- Pommard, Côte-d'Or, France

The partnership is represented at the yearly wine festival by a wine stand.

== Culture and sightseeing ==
=== Buildings ===
==== Town Hall ====
Into the 15th century, the village court's and the local administration's official business was being done outdoors under a tree on the lordly estate of Saint Stephen's Monastery, which held the local lordship.

In the 16th century, a town hall was built on the monastery land, before which hereditary homage for the new local lord, the Elector of Mainz, was paid in 1616 by the inhabitants of the "market town (Flecken) of Nackenheim".

This old town hall had to give way in 1751 to a new timber-frame building. The upper floors housed a room for the local court and a consulting room. On the ground floor was found a firefighting equipment room with the leather fire-quenching pails and the calibration master's equipment. His job was to measure the wine casks and certify with a brand stamp that they were calibrated. Moreover, there was a holding cell, locally called the Kittje, where wrongdoers were kept for short periods of time.

Serving as the first Schultheiß at the new town hall was Paul Kertz (1749–1763). In 1792, after the French Revolutionary army had marched in, a commander's office under Civil General Daniel Stamm moved in. In 1793, the citizenry elected, instead of the Schultheiß Johannes Herd the local clergyman Dr. Karl Melchior Arand as maire. During the short occupation in 1796, the French installed Wilhelm Jans as agent municipal. Beginning in 1797, when Nackenheim would belong to France for 17 years, only an adjunct was in office at town hall; the maire sat in Bodenheim. This double-municipality administrative arrangement was kept by the Grand Duchy of Hesse beginning in 1816. The mayor of Bodenheim was also responsible for Nackenheim. In 1822, Nackenheim got an independent "Grand-Ducal Hessian Mayoralty" (Großherzogliche Hessische Bürgermeisterei) under mayor Johann Schneider (1822–1831).

Above the Town Hall entrance with its coat of arms and year 1751 was a niche in which it is believed a statue of the local patron saint, Stephen, once stood; since the French Revolution it had stood empty. Only in 1931 was a Madonna figure – "Mary Mother of Peace" – put there on council member Dr. Franz Usinger's motion to give thanks for the freeing of the Rhineland by Allied troops. During the Third Reich, the figure had to be taken down until it could assume its place once again when the Second World War ended in 1945.

In 1935 the Town Hall was thoroughly converted. Among other things, the entrance was put in the middle, where it is today. Further renovations followed in 1950 and 1951 for the Town Hall's 200th anniversary. The last overhauls came in 1962 and 1980.

In the framework of a review in November 1992, considerable damage to ceiling beams by brown rot was observed, which led in December 1992 to the first damage analysis, confirming this damage. Together with the municipality of Nackenheim, the historic preservation authorities and the assigned structural engineer, a far-reaching, extensive structural investigation was agreed upon with the goal of planning an overhaul for the Town Hall befitting a monument. This was also to include a building deformation survey. These important preliminary investigations had been and were necessary for a detailed tender to begin an overhaul whose cost could be calculated for the municipality. Work began in November 1994. It was an outstanding performance.

=== Regular events ===
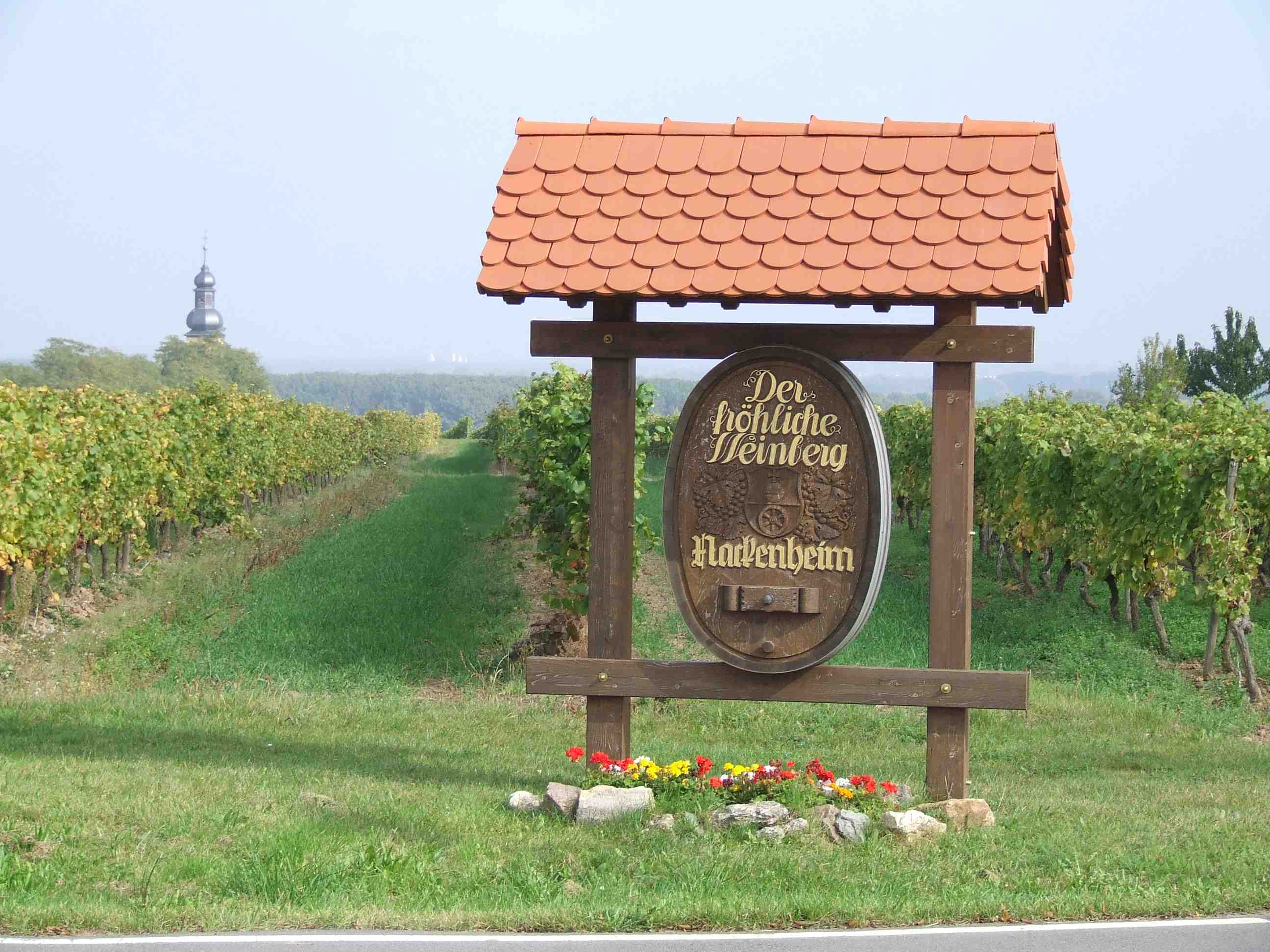
Der fröhliche Weinberg in Nackenheim.

- Procession with John's Fire on the Rhine at the feast of John of Nepomuk
- Inselfest ("Island Festival") of the DLRG Ortsgruppe-Nackenheim e. V. on the second last weekend in July
- Wine festival on the last weekend in July
- Inselfest ("Island Festival") of the Männeresangverein 1857 (men's singing club) on the last weekend in August
- Parish festival at Corpus Christi
- Church consecration festival on the fourth Sunday in September
- Outdoor theatre productions by the Carl Zuckmayer-Gesellschaft Mainz in summer
- Baked fish festival of the angling club on the idyllic angling pond
- Carnival sessions and parade on Carnival Thursday through the local streets with the Carnival club Entenbrüder ("Duck Brothers")

== Economy and infrastructure ==
=== Winegrowing ===
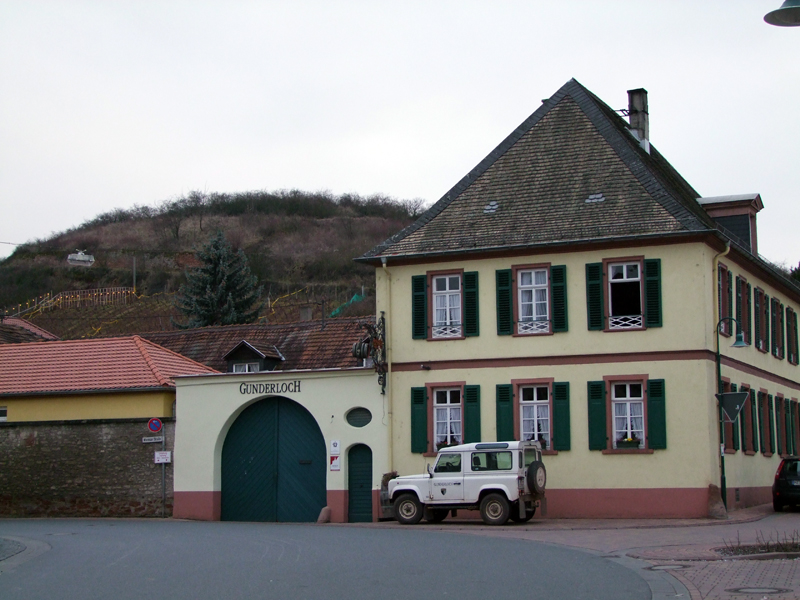
Gunderloch Winery

The Gunderloch Winery is a member of the Verband Deutscher Prädikatseingüter (VDP).

=== Education ===
- Carl Zuckmayer Grundschule (primary school)
- Janusz Korczak Regionalschule (Gymnasium as of 2008)

=== Transport ===
- 14 km south of Mainz, linked to the Autobahn network by the four-lane Bundesstraße 9.
- Mainz-Worms railway line with synchronized timetabling.
- A landing stage on the Rhine's bank allows passenger ships of all sizes to land.
- Cycle paths link Nackenheim with Bodenheim, Mainz and Nierstein. A path between Nackenheim and Lörzweiler was also newly built and opened between autumn 2006 and early 2007.

== Famous people ==
=== Sons and daughters of the town ===
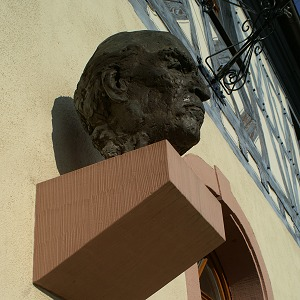
Bust of Carl Zuckmayer

- Carl Zuckmayer, born here in 1896. In his play Der fröhliche Weinberg ("The Merry Vineyard") he gave his homeland a lasting memorial. A bust at the entrance to the municipal administration still recalls him today.
- Eduard Zuckmayer, pedagogue, composer, conductor and pianist
- Prof. Dr. Matthias Pier, was a chemist, above all in the fields of hydrogenation of coal.
- Regine Usinger, (b. 1958), later Usinger-Frank, German Wine Queen, 1980/1981

=== Famous people who have worked in the community ===
- Christine Darmstadt was a very well known midwife in the time of the Second World War. Her house stands at the foot of Christine-Darmstadt Straße, which leads to the "Am Sprunk" new development area. She was named an honorary citizen of Nackenheim in the 1960s.
