= Weingut Gunderloch =

German wine grower and producer

- Location: Nackenheim, Germany
- Appellation: Rheinhessen
- Founded: 1890
- Key people: Friedrich Hasselbach, Agnes Hasselbach-Usinger and Johannes Hasselbach
- Varietal: Riesling
- Website: gunderloch.de

Weingut Gunderloch

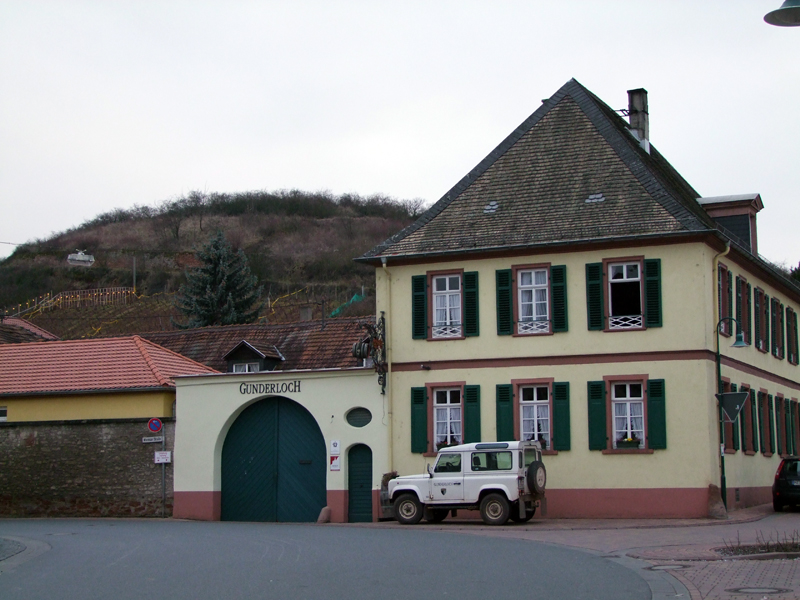
Weingut Gunderloch in Nackenheim

Weingut Gunderloch is a German wine grower and producer based in Nackenheim in the Rheinhessen wine region.

== History ==
The Gunderloch estate was created by a banker hailing from Mainz in 1890 during the German Gründerzeit. Carl Gunderloch, originating from Gundersheim, acquired the Dalheimer Hof from the secularised property of the Cistercian abbey of Dalheim near Mainz, as well as some outstanding vineyards like the “Nackenheimer Rothenberg” in the “Roter Hang” (Red slope). Following his capital investment he became a protagonist of a new quality oriented viticulture on the Rhinefront. After his death, his winery was divided between his two daughters. The current owner is Agnes Hasselbach-Usinger, the fifth generation in the winery. There are three children of the sixth generation: Stefanie married the Austrian winemaker Alwin Jurtschitsch and is now cellar master at that estate in Kamptal, Austria. Johannes Hasselbach became the winemaker at Gunderloch upon the death of his father Fritz in 2016.

The name of the estate owner Gunderloch had become known since 1925 by the comedy The Merry Vineyard written by Carl Zuckmayer. The fashion of the comedy did not amuse Gunderloch and all the other Nackenheim wine producers, because they had been described as petty bourgeois.

In the course of the 1970s the Geisenheimer Fritz Hasselbach saw the importance of the international printed wine media as a marketing instrument for estates and their top vineyards. In 1979 Agnes and Fritz Hasselbach decided to invest in their winery and to quit their jobs as a teacher in a private school and in the former Landeslehr- und Versuchsanstalt für Wein- und Gartenbau (“federal experimental station for viticulture and horticulture”) in Oppenheim, today: Dienstleistungszentrum Ländlicher Raum. During the years, important networks to leading wine critics like Stuart Pigott were established and maintained. Johannes Hasselbach took over the responsibility for the estate. He is heading the Rheinhessen regional association of the VDP since December 2019.

Regine Usinger, (born 1958), married Usinger-Frank, was German wine queen during 1980/1981.

The estate is exporting its wine to 34 countries.

== Vineyards and wine ==
Gunderloch works with 14 hectares vineyards, including vines in Niersteiner Pettental and Hipping. These are selected sites, capable to produce ″Grosses Gewächs″, top-level dry wines. The leading grape variety cultivated is Riesling with 80%. 6% burgundy and 5% Silvaner are notable as well. The remaining percentages split in specialties. An average yield of 55 hl/ha is achieved.
