= Harxheim =

- Municipality
- Coat of arms

- Location of Harxheim within Mainz-Bingen district
- Interactive map of Harxheim
- Location within Germany Location within Rhineland-Palatinate
- Coordinates: 49°54′19″N 8°15′51″E
- Country: Germany
- State: Rhineland-Palatinate
- District: Mainz-Bingen
- Municipal assoc.: Bodenheim

Government
  - Mayor (2024–29): Andreas Hofreuter (CDU)

Area
  - Total: 3.51 km^{2} (1.36 sq mi)
- Elevation: 140 m (460 ft)

Population (2025-12-31)
  - Total: 2,228
  - Density: 635/km^{2} (1,640/sq mi)
- Time zone: UTC+01:00 (CET)
  - Summer (DST): UTC+02:00 (CEST)
- Postal codes: 55296
- Dialling codes: 06138
- Vehicle registration: MZ
- Website: www.harxheim.de

Harxheim (German pronunciation: [ˈhaʁkshaɪm]) is an Ortsgemeinde – a municipality belonging to a Verbandsgemeinde, a kind of collective municipality – in the Mainz-Bingen district in Rhineland-Palatinate, Germany.

== Geography ==
=== Location ===
Harxheim is a winegrowing village on Mainz’s southern outskirts. It belongs to the Verbandsgemeinde of Bodenheim, whose seat is in the like-named municipality.

== History ==
Harxheim was first mentioned in 767.

== Politics ==
=== Municipal council ===
The council is made up of 16 council members, counting the part-time mayor, with seats apportioned thus:

	CDU	SPD	FDP	FWG	Total
2014	6	7	1	2	16 seats
2009	7	6	1	2	16 seats
2004	6	8	–	2	16 seats

(as at municipal election held on 25 May 2014)

=== Coat of arms ===
The municipality's arms might be described thus: Or an oak sprig slipped in chief dexter acorned of two, the acorns per pale in chief and per pale reversed in base, the whole in bend, and an ear of grain slipped, the head in chief sinister, per bend sinister, all vert, the whole surmounted by a bunch of grapes azure slipped of the second, with the stem twisted round upon itself.

The German blazon states that the first two charges, the oak sprig and the ear of grain, are to be vert (green), although the latter is not shown here in that tincture, but in something that might be blazoned “proper” (that is, in natural colours). Heraldry of the World has no information on the arms’ origin or meaning, but does show the arms in the tinctures specified by the blazon.

== Economy and infrastructure ==
=== Transport ===
The nearest Autobahn interchange is Mainz-Hechtsheim on the A 60, some 7 km away.
