= Julia-Christina Stange =

German politician

Member of the Bundestag from Rhineland-Palatinate
- Incumbent
- Assumed office 2025

Personal details
- Born: 25 April 1978 (age 47) Aachen
- Party: Die Linke

Julia-Christina Stange (born 25 April 1978) is a German politician from Die Linke. She was elected to the Bundestag in the 2025 German federal election.

== Biography ==
Stange is a pediatric nurse specializing in anesthesia and intensive care at the University Hospital Mainz and a member of the staff council there. She is a member of Ver.di and is the spokesperson for the alliance Pflege.Auf.Stand RLP ( Nursing.Stand.RLP).

She is a single mother of two children and lives in Saulheim.

== Political career ==
Stange joined The Left in 2023 and is a member of the Die Linke Rhineland-Palatinate state executive committee.

She ran as a direct candidate in the Worms constituency in the 2025 German federal election and entered the Bundestag via second place on the Rhineland-Palatinate Left Party's state list.
