= Bodenheim (Verbandsgemeinde) =

- Verbandsgemeinde
- Coat of arms

- Location of Bodenheim within Mainz-Bingen district
- Interactive map of Bodenheim
- Location within Germany Location within Rhineland-Palatinate
- Coordinates: 49°56′N 8°19′E
- Country: Germany
- State: Rhineland-Palatinate
- District: Mainz-Bingen
- Seat: Bodenheim
- Subdivisions: 5 municipalities

Area
  - Total: 34.16 km^{2} (13.19 sq mi)

Population (2025-12-31)
  - Total: 19,591
  - Density: 573.5/km^{2} (1,485/sq mi)
- Time zone: UTC+01:00 (CET)
  - Summer (DST): UTC+02:00 (CEST)
- Website: www.vg-bodenheim.de

Bodenheim is a Verbandsgemeinde ("collective municipality") in the district Mainz-Bingen in Rhineland-Palatinate, Germany. The seat of the Verbandsgemeinde is in Bodenheim.

The Verbandsgemeinde Bodenheim consists of the following Ortsgemeinden ("local municipalities"):

1. Bodenheim
2. Gau-Bischofsheim
3. Harxheim
4. Lörzweiler
5. Nackenheim

== Coat of Arms ==
The coat of arms of the Verbandsgemeinde Bodenheim is a shield parted by a bend sinister parted of gules and argent, above right argent a bunch of grapes vert with leaf of the same, beneath left gules a 6-spokes wheel argent, orle parted per bend sinister of gules and argent. The wheel refers to the Archbishopric of Mainz, the grapes to the wine region Rheinhessen Bodenheim is part of.
