= Lörzweiler =

- Municipality
- Coat of arms

- Location of Lörzweiler within Mainz-Bingen district
- Interactive map of Lörzweiler
- Location within Germany Location within Rhineland-Palatinate
- Coordinates: 49°53′53″N 8°17′40″E
- Country: Germany
- State: Rhineland-Palatinate
- District: Mainz-Bingen
- Municipal assoc.: Bodenheim

Government
  - Mayor (2019–24): Steffan Haub (CDU)

Area
  - Total: 5.74 km^{2} (2.22 sq mi)
- Elevation: 154 m (505 ft)

Population (2025-12-31)
  - Total: 2,266
  - Density: 395/km^{2} (1,020/sq mi)
- Time zone: UTC+01:00 (CET)
  - Summer (DST): UTC+02:00 (CEST)
- Postal codes: 55296
- Dialling codes: 06138
- Vehicle registration: MZ
- Website: www.loerzweiler.de

Lörzweiler is an Ortsgemeinde – a municipality belonging to a Verbandsgemeinde, a kind of collective municipality – in the Mainz-Bingen district in Rhineland-Palatinate, Germany.

== Geography ==
=== Location ===
The winegrowing centre of roughly 2,300 inhabitants distinguishes itself in particular with its winegrowing areas of Mainzer St. Alban and Niersteiner Gutes Domtal with their vineyards Ölgild, Königstuhl and Hohberg.

In the municipal area's south stands the 175 m-high Königstuhl, upon which on 8 September 1024 Conrad II was reportedly elected. The municipality belongs to the Verbandsgemeinde of Bodenheim, whose seat is in the like-named municipality.

== Politics ==
=== Municipal council ===
The council is made up of 17 council members, counting the part-time mayor, with seats apportioned thus:

	CDU	SPD	FWG	Total
2004	6	6	4	16 seats

(as at municipal election held on 13 June 2004)

=== Town partnerships ===
- Époisses, Côte-d'Or, France

=== Coat of arms ===
The municipality's arms might be described thus: Argent a limetree seedling eradicated sable leafed of five veined vert.

== Culture and sightseeing ==
=== Regular events ===
- The kermis (church consecration festival) is held by the municipality yearly on the weekend after Ascension Day.
- Beginning on the first Friday in July, the Weinfest am Königstuhl is held for four days. In November, the great beer testing is traditionally held in the Hohberghalle.
- Each year on the first weekend in September, the estate festival at the Haub winery takes place.
