= Carsten Propp =

German politician (born 1977)

Member of the Landtag of Rhineland-Palatinate
- Incumbent
- Assumed office 18 May 2026

Personal details
- Born: 1977 (age 48–49)
- Party: Alternative for Germany

Carsten Propp (born 1977) is a German politician who was elected member of the Landtag of Rhineland-Palatinate in 2026. He has served as group leader of the Alternative for Germany in the Verbandsgemeinde council of Rhein-Selz since 2024.
