= Bodenheim =

- Municipality
- Coat of arms

- Location of Bodenheim within Mainz-Bingen district
- Interactive map of Bodenheim
- Location within Germany Location within Rhineland-Palatinate
- Coordinates: 49°55′47″N 8°18′48″E
- Country: Germany
- State: Rhineland-Palatinate
- District: Mainz-Bingen
- Municipal assoc.: Bodenheim

Government
  - Mayor (2024–29): Jens Mutzke (SPD)

Area
  - Total: 13.43 km^{2} (5.19 sq mi)
- Elevation: 100 m (330 ft)

Population (2025-12-31)
  - Total: 7,605
  - Density: 566.3/km^{2} (1,467/sq mi)
- Time zone: UTC+01:00 (CET)
  - Summer (DST): UTC+02:00 (CEST)
- Postal codes: 55294
- Dialling codes: 06135
- Vehicle registration: MZ
- Website: www.bodenheim.de

Bodenheim (German pronunciation: [ˈboːdn̩ˌhaɪ̯m]) is a state-recognized tourism municipality (Fremdenverkehrsgemeinde) in the Mainz-Bingen district in Rhineland-Palatinate, Germany

== Geography ==
=== Location ===
The municipality lies roughly 12 km south of downtown Mainz on the edge of the Frankfurt Rhine Main Region. The municipality is strongly characterized by winegrowing. The many wineries and Straußwirtschaften invite visitors to come and enjoy the wine. Since 1972, Bodenheim has been the seat of the Verbandsgemeinde of Bodenheim, a kind of collective municipality.

== History ==
Bodenheim's first documented mention was in 754, and it marked its 1,250-year jubilee in 2004.

On 29 June 1988, two US F-16C combat aircraft collided near the municipality and fell over an uninhabited area. One of the pilots managed to save himself with his ejection seat, while the other, Captain Mike Crandall, was killed.

=== Population development ===
- 1750: roughly 1,200
- 1955: 4,214
- 1970: 4,494
- 31 December 2006: 7,060
- 30 June 2008: 7,092
- 31 December 2022: 7.984

== Politics ==
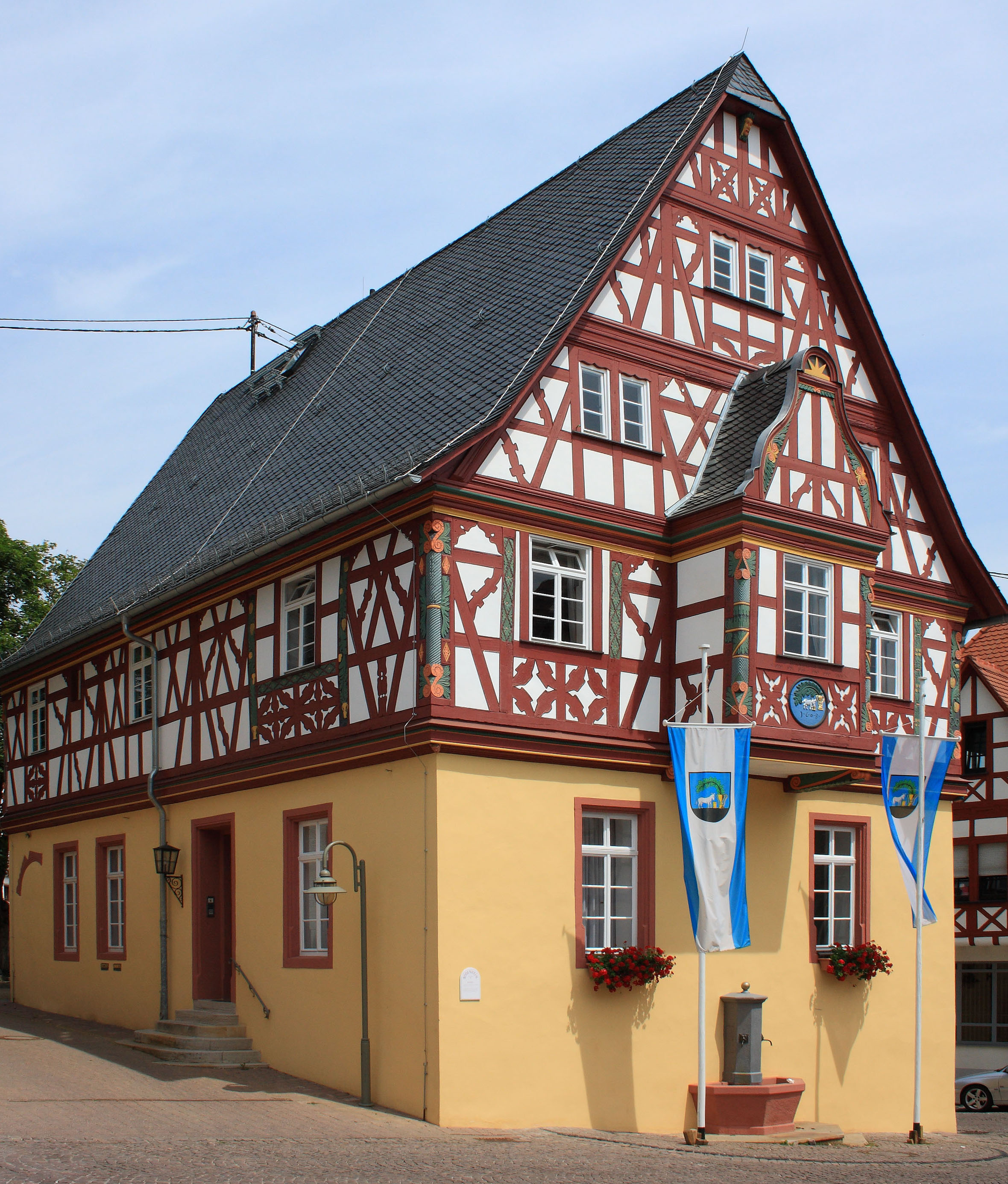
Town Hall

=== Municipal council ===
The runoff election on Sunday 27 June 2004 yielded the following results:

- Eligible voters: 5,386
- Ballots cast: 3,166
- Valid votes: 3,143
- Alfons Achatz (CDU) 1,637 votes
- Thomas Becker-Theilig (SPD) 1,506 votes

The Municipal Mayor (Ortsbürgermeister) is represented by two deputies:

- First Deputy: Otfried Nehren, FWG
- Second Deputy: Ingrid Kerz, CDU

The municipal election held on 26 May 2019 yielded the following results:

- Eligible voters: 6,058
- Ballots cast: 4,430
- Valid votes: 4,386
- SPD: 2,218 (50.6%, 13 seats)
- CDU: 1,211 (27.6%, 6 seats)
- FDP: 179 (4.1%, 1 seat)
- FWG: 778 (17.7%, 4 seats)

The municipal election held on 9 June 2024 yielded the following results:

- Eligible voters: 6,128
- Ballots cast: 4,560
- Valid votes: 4,487
- SPD: 1,426 (31.8%, 8 seats)
- CDU: 1,723 (38.4%, 9 seats)
- GRÜNE: 723 (16.1, 4 seats)
- FDP: 93 (2.1%, 0 seat)
- FWG: 522 (11.6%, 3 seats)

Current political issues facing the Municipality of Bodenheim are the building of a road on the outskirts to relieve the historic community core of through traffic, the rising cost of building a community centre, the creation of a new sport facility outside the built-up core and the strained budget situation.

=== Mayor ===
Since 2009, the mayor has been Thomas Becker-Theilig (SPD). He has been succeeded by Jens Mutzke (SPD) in 2024.

=== Coat of arms ===
The municipality's arms might be described thus: Azure on a base sable an ass repassant argent, his head over a manger Or, to sinister thereof a vase with double handles of the same issuant from which a palm frond embowed to dexter vert.

According to legend, the Provost of Saint Alban's Abbey in Mainz, to which Bodenheim then belonged, demanded of the Emperor minting rights. The Emperor, though, mocked him, saying “He wants to mint coins, does he? An old ass shall he mint!” (in German: “Münzen will Er prägen? Einen alten Esel soll Er münzen!”). With great irony, however, the ass was later chosen as a charge for the coat of arms.

=== Town partnerships ===
- Seurre, Côte-d'Or, France
- Grezzana, Province of Verona, Veneto, Italy
- (Germany) Rudolstadt, Saalfeld-Rudolstadt, Thuringia

== Culture and sightseeing ==
=== Buildings ===
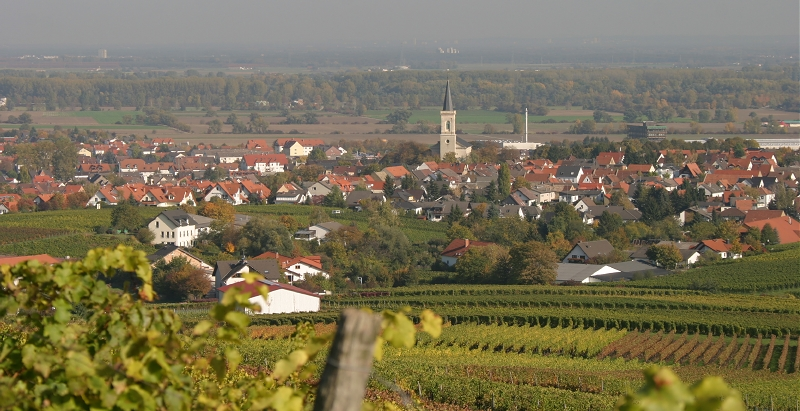
St. Alban's Church

- Saint Alban's Church

The Catholic parish church was built about 1830. It is a hall church with barrel vaulting with a west tower, square quire and apse. The painting and stucco date from 1910.

- Evangelical Church

The foundation stone for the Evangelical Church in Bodenheim was laid on 16 May 1887. Master builder Baron von Schmitt, who was also given the job of restoring Saint Catherine’s Church (Katharinenkirche) in Oppenheim, drew up plans for the church while master church builder Otto Schwarze took on the job of overseeing the building work. In the Gothic Revival style there arose a house of worship built out of quarried limestone blocks with a slated hip roof and a decorative flèche. Inside the building are found, among other things, three stained-glass windows in the quire showing Christ’s birth, Crucifixion and Resurrection, and the artistically carved pulpit, which is borne by the Four Evangelists. On 26 September 1888 came the church’s festive consecration. Today the Evangelical Church is open all week from 8:00 to 19:00 for devotions and sightseeing.

- Kapelle Maria-Oberndorf

The Gothic Revival Marian pilgrimage chapel of Maria-Oberndorf arose in the years 1889-1891 according episcopal cathedral master builder Lukas’s plans. The first documentary mention of a church building on this same spot comes from 1217, although its beginnings are believed to be older. This first church building was destroyed in the Thirty Years' War. The pilgrimage festival is held yearly on the first Sunday after 2 July (Visitation) and is part of the Bishopric of Mainz pilgrimage calendar.

- Historic Town Hall

Without a doubt, the municipality’s centrepiece is the Town Hall, which the knightly monastery had built in 1608 as a new courthouse (for the higher and village court). The two-floor building with a gabled roof and lovely indoor stucco work is typical of Franconian-Hessian timber-frame construction of the Renaissance after 1555. The massively built ground floor was originally an open hall with a round-arch opening (remnants were brought to light in 1968). The in parts “disordered” timber-frame structure over the entrance suggests that there was once an outdoor stairway up to the first floor. All cornerposts, the odd slanted beam, various crossbeams and the whole oriel are covered in vine and grape carvings, mouldings and grotesque faces. On a windowpost facing the Rhine, the names of the Schultheiß (roughly “sheriff”) and the Schöffen (roughly “lay jurists”) in the year when the Town Hall was built can still be made out.

=== Sport ===
- Ländlicher Reit- und Fahrverein Bodenheim e.V.

The riding club, founded in 1973, has in the last few years experienced a great upswing. By expanding the club’s own sport facilities (2 riding halls 20 × 60 m und 20 × 40 m, 1 big showjumping square, 2 dressage squares, 4 tennis courts with clubhouse) and staging local and regional events it managed to broaden their offerings markedly. The chief chairman is Mr. Günter Scholles.

- TV 1848 Bodenheim

The gymnastic club was founded in 1848, and with more than 1,700 members is Bodenheim's biggest club, and one of Rhenish Hesse’s biggest. Gymnastics, team handball, athletics, volleyball and much more belong to the Bodenheim gymnastic club’s sport offerings

- VfB 1909 Bodenheim

This sport club was founded in 1909 and after TV Bodenheim is the municipality’s biggest club. It is made up of two departments, for table tennis and football.

=== Clubs ===
- Gesangverein Concordia 1872 Bodenheim e.V.

The singing club was founded in 1872 as a men’s choir that took upon itself to foster the international repertoire. Since 2000 there has also been a mixed choir by the name of Free Voices (so called even in German) whose repertoire consists of modern pieces (pop and rock music).

- Bodenheimer Carneval-Verein 1935 e.V.

The club was founded in 1935-03-03. It promotes and maintains the tradition of carnival in the region.

=== Regular events ===
- St. Albansfest, named after Saint Alban of Mainz, takes place on the first weekend in June.
- Kirchweihfest (church consecration festival, locally known as the Kerb) on the third weekend in September
- Wine tasting on the Wine Lore Path – on the Sunday after the Kerb (fourth weekend in September)
- Nikolausmarkt in the old community core - on the first weekend in Advent

== Economy and infrastructure ==
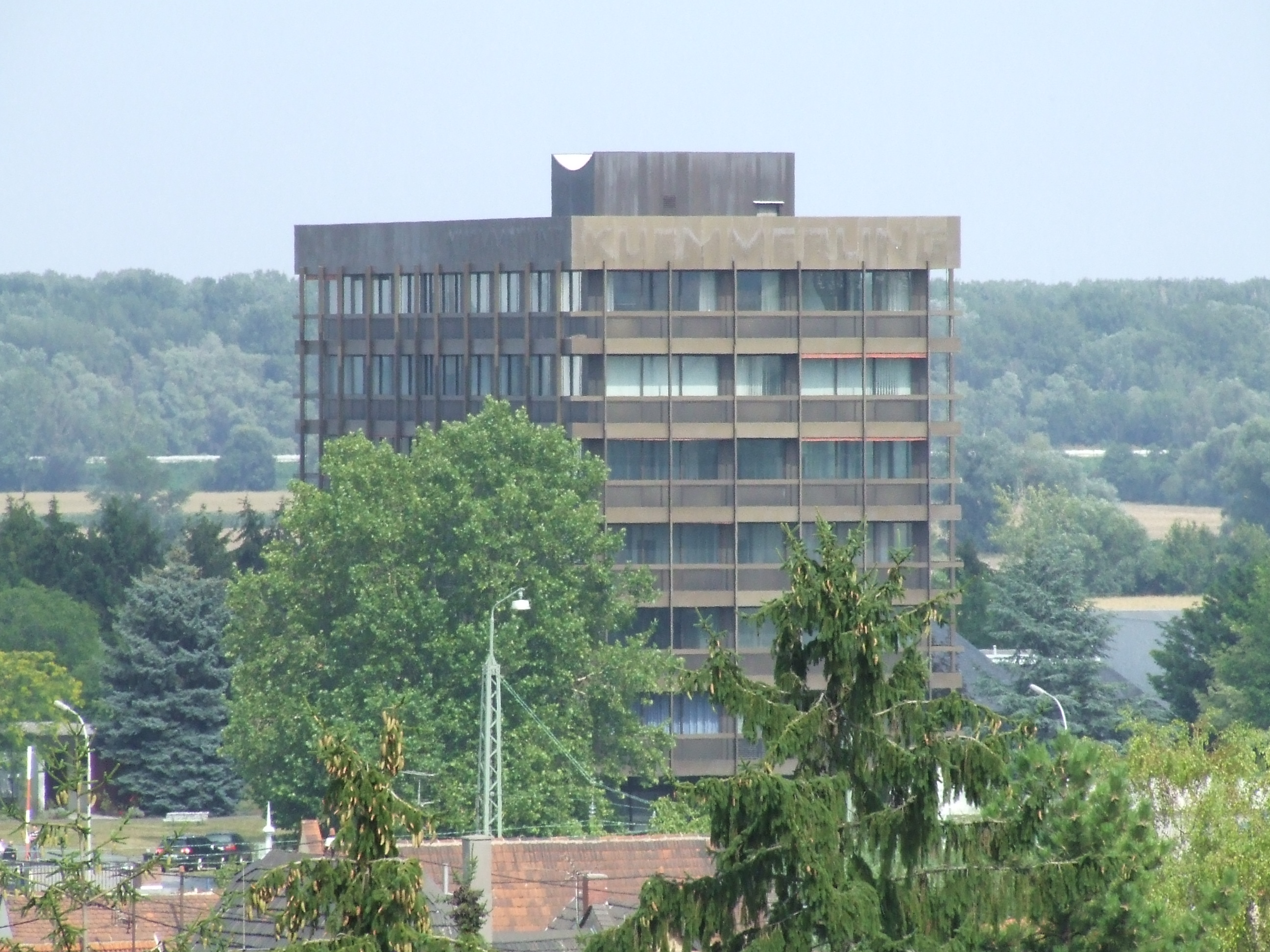
Former Kuemmerling building

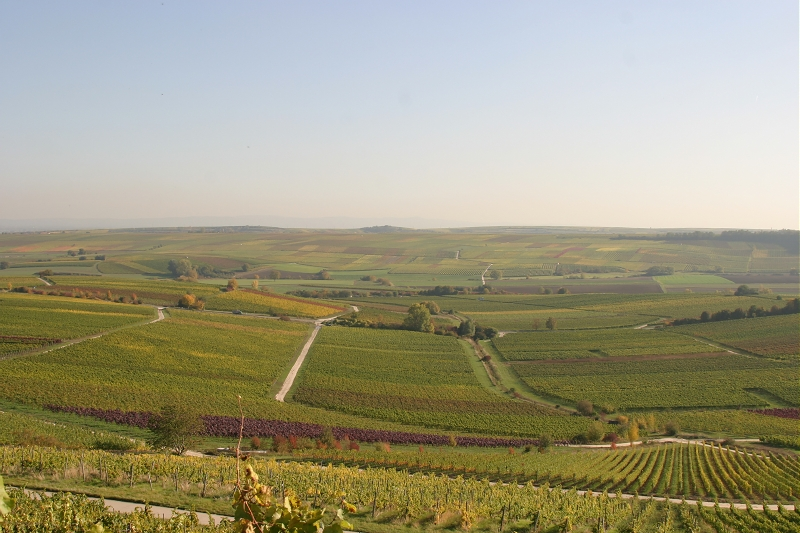
Vineyards around Bodenheim

In Bodenheim the following businesses are or were resident:

- Kuemmerling, bitters
- Hilge, pump factory, GEA Group
- Herdt-Verlag für Bildungsmedien GmbH, publishing house for educational media

=== Winegrowing ===
In Bodenheim, there is winegrowing on 426 ha shared among vineyards owned by Kapelle, Kreuzberg, Silberberg, Hoch, Leidhecke, Westrum, Heitersbrünnchen, Ebersberg, Burgweg, Mönchspfad and Reichsritterstift. All together, there are currently (as of 2003) 79 active winegrowing operations with a working area greater than 3 000 m². The winegrowing lands are divided into 315 ha of white wine varieties and 112 ha of red wine varieties. Of white wine varieties, 72 ha are taken up by Silvaner vines and 71 ha by Müller-Thurgau. Dornfelder, at 47 ha is currently the most strongly represented red wine variety.

A vine theme park guides the tourist through the vineyards explaining the most sought vines at the sites where they are planted.

==== VDP members ====
The Weingut Oberstleutnant Liebrecht'sche Gutsverwaltung (winery) goes back to the estate built by the nuns from Altmünster Abbey in 1754 between the parish estate and the municipality of Weed. The career officer Friedrich Wilhelm Liebrecht realigned the vineyards’ boundaries and is counted among the founders of the Verband Deutscher Naturwein Versteigerer, the forerunner of the Verband Deutscher Prädikatsweingüter (VDP). The winery was led until 2010 by a fourth-generation descendant, Mr. Fritz Nacke.

The Weingut Kühling Gillot was taken over in 2002 by the Geisenheim winegrowing engineer Carolin Gillot. Carolin, now Spanier-Gillot, managed to build on her father's years-long quality work and support. She is cofounder of the young winegrowers’ association “message in a bottle” and busies herself in the Rhenish Hesse regional association of the women's wine network “Vinissima”.

=== Public institutions ===
The municipality of Bodenheim is also the seat of the Verbandsgemeinde of Bodenheim

- Senior citizens’ meeting place

On the municipality’s behalf, the local workers’ welfare community club runs a meeting place for senior citizens.

- Welfare centre

Sponsored by the Mainz Caritas association

- Grundschule Bodenheim

The municipality of Bodenheim is the seat of a primary school with four parallel classes in each grade, which is sponsored by the Verbandsgemeinde

- Öffentliche Bücherei St. Alban

On the primary school’s grounds is found the St. Alban public library with a collection of roughly 6,500 media units.

- Kindertagesstätte Spatzennest

The kindergarten with five parallel classes offers all together 125 places for children aged three and up, of which 50 are all-day places.
