= Westhofen (Verbandsgemeinde) =

Coordinates: 49.70°N 8.25°E

Westhofen is a former Verbandsgemeinde ("collective municipality") in the district Alzey-Worms, Rhineland-Palatinate, Germany. The seat of the Verbandsgemeinde was in Westhofen. On 1 July 2014 it merged into the new Verbandsgemeinde Wonnegau.

The Verbandsgemeinde Westhofen consisted of the following Ortsgemeinden ("local municipalities"):

1. Bechtheim
2. Bermersheim
3. Dittelsheim-Heßloch
4. Frettenheim
5. Gundersheim
6. Gundheim
7. Hangen-Weisheim
8. Hochborn
9. Monzernheim
10. Westhofen
