= Bermersheim =

- Municipality
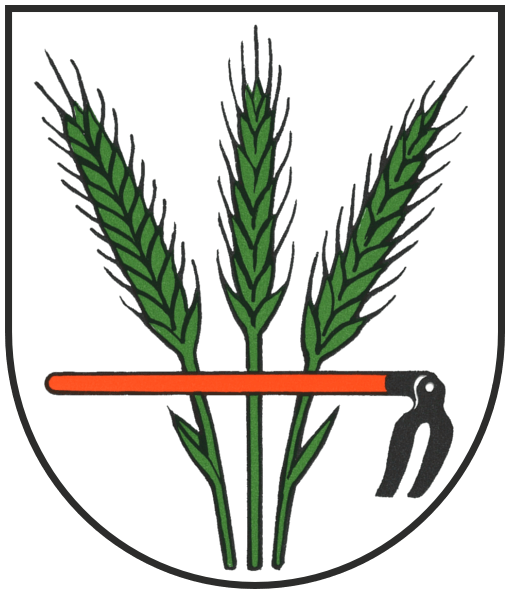
- Coat of arms

- Location of Bermersheim within Alzey-Worms district
- Interactive map of Bermersheim
- Location within Germany Location within Rhineland-Palatinate
- Coordinates: 49°40′55″N 8°13′25″E
- Country: Germany
- State: Rhineland-Palatinate
- District: Alzey-Worms
- Municipal assoc.: Wonnegau

Government
  - Mayor (2019–24): Andreas Obenauer

Area
  - Total: 2.32 km^{2} (0.90 sq mi)
- Elevation: 175 m (574 ft)

Population (2025-12-31)
  - Total: 327
  - Density: 141/km^{2} (365/sq mi)
- Time zone: UTC+01:00 (CET)
  - Summer (DST): UTC+02:00 (CEST)
- Postal codes: 67593
- Dialling codes: 06244
- Vehicle registration: AZ
- Website: www.bermersheim.de

Bermersheim (German pronunciation: [ˈbɛʁmɐshaɪm]) is an Ortsgemeinde – a municipality belonging to a Verbandsgemeinde, a kind of collective municipality – in the Alzey-Worms district in Rhineland-Palatinate, Germany. It is a winegrowing centre in the Rhenish Hesse wine region.

== Geography ==
=== Location ===
Bermersheim lies in Rhenish Hesse, in the west of the Verbandsgemeinde of Wonnegau, whose seat is in Osthofen. Bermersheim can be reached through the Gundersheim interchange on the A 61, or by public transport from Worms.

=== Neighbouring municipalities ===
Bermersheim borders in the north on the municipality of Gundersheim, in the northeast on the municipality of Westhofen, in the south on the municipality of Gundheim (all in the Verbandsgemeinde of Wonnegau), in the southwest on the constituent community of Dalsheim in the municipality of Flörsheim-Dalsheim (Verbandsgemeinde of Monsheim), and in the northwest on the municipality of Ober-Flörsheim (Verbandsgemeinde of Alzey-Land).

== Politics ==
=== Municipal council ===
The council is made up of 8 council members, who were elected at a municipal election held on 7 June 2009, with the honorary mayor as chairwoman.

The municipal election held on 7 June 2009 yielded the following results:

	SPD	FDP	FWG	Total
2009	2	3	3	8 seats
2004	2	3	3	8 seats

=== Coat of arms ===
The municipality's arms might be described thus: Argent three ears of wheat in fess palewise vert surmounted at the nombril point by a prong hoe fesswise sable.

The Verbandsgemeinde’s website shows a slightly different coat of arms, with the prong hoe's handle in a different tincture, namely gules (red). This site does not contain any text about Bermersheim's coat of arms.

== Culture and sightseeing ==
=== Natural monuments ===
Bermersheim is one of the places in Rhenish Hesse where mammalian remains from some ten million years ago have been found, in the prehistoric Rhine’s Deinotherium Sands, whose name comes from this extinct proboscid's teeth and bone remnants, which are often yielded up by these deposits.
