= Jan Metzler =

German politician

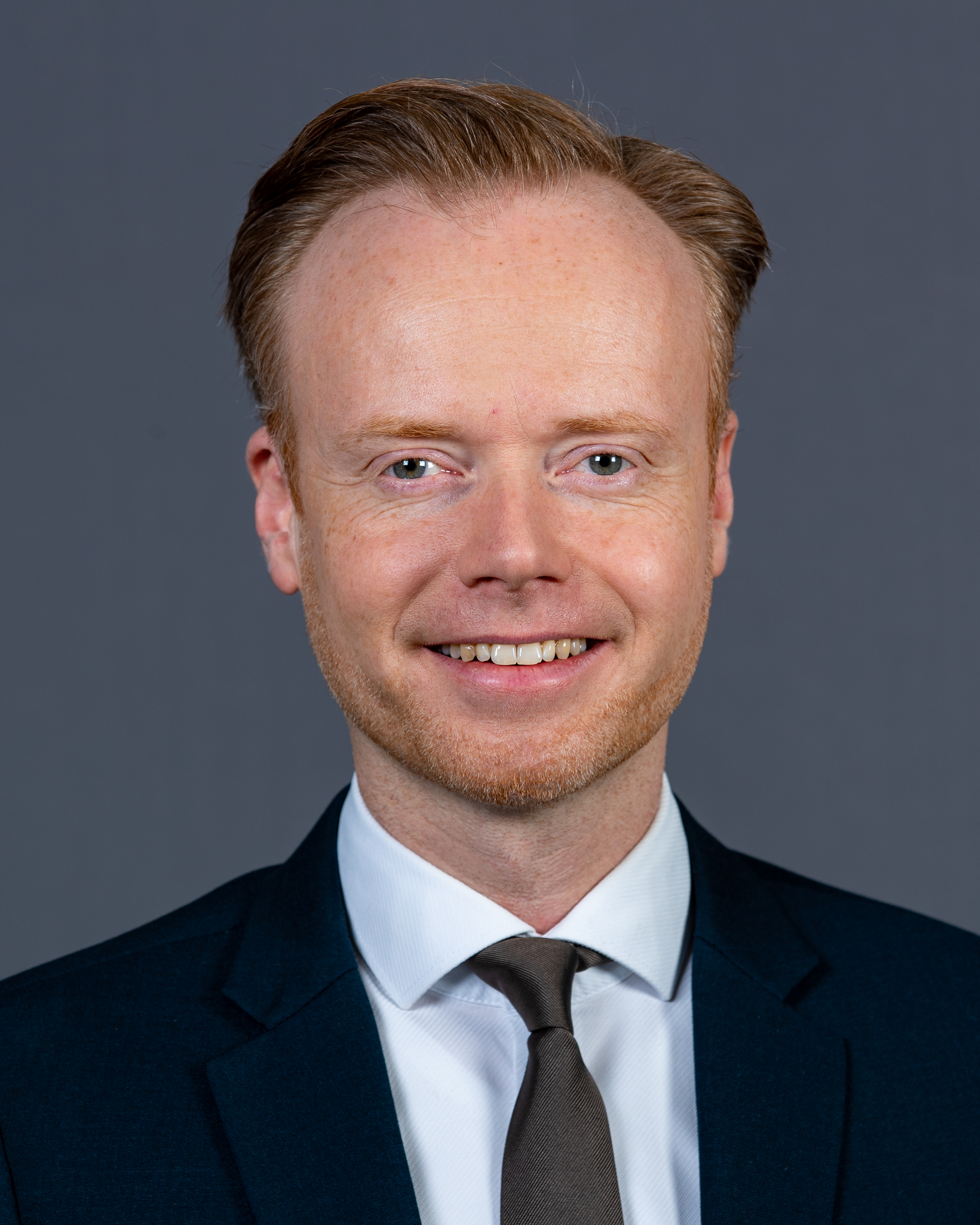

Member of the Bundestag
- Incumbent
- Assumed office 2013

Personal details
- Born: 5 July 1981 (age 45) Worms, West Germany
- Party: Christian Democratic Union (CDU)
- Education: University of Applied Sciences, Worms

Jan Metzler (born 5 July 1981) is a German politician who represents the Christian Democratic Union (CDU) in the Bundestag, the German federal parliament. Metzler was first elected in the 2013 election, gaining the constituency of Worms, which had previously been held by the Social Democratic Party of Germany (SPD) since its creation in 1949.

== Early life and education ==
Metzler was born in Worms, West Germany in 1981. He came from a family of winemakers and his sister had been German Wine Princess for 2007/2008. Like his father, he trained to be a winemaker and studied Business Administration, gaining an MBA and a master's degree in International Management.

== Political career ==
=== Career in local politics ===
Prior to his election to the Bundestag, Metzler had held a number of roles in his local party, serving as a member of the CDU District Executive for Alzey-Worms from 2000 to 2008, on the CDU district board for Rheinhessen-Pfalz from 2001 onwards and as District Chairman of the Alzey-Worms branch of the CDU from 2003 to 2012. His first public role came in 2004, when he was elected to Alzey-Worms district council. Since 2004 he has served as Deputy Chairman of the CDU parliamentary group in the Westhofen collective municipal council and Chairman of the CDU faction in the Dittelsheim-Heßloch council.

In addition to serving as a local councillor, Metzler subsequently spent five years as the international coordinator at the University of Applied Sciences of Worms and was responsible for supervising the student foreign exchange programs.

=== Member of the German Parliament, 2013–present ===
Metzler was selected as the CDU candidate for Worms in November 2012. For the 2013 election, in addition to being a candidate for Worms, Metzler had been placed eleventh on the CDU list for Rhineland-Palatinate In the election, he increased the CDU vote share by 7% on an increased turnout and beat his SPD challenger Marcus Held.

In parliament, Metzler has been a member of the Committee on Economic Affairs and Energy (since 2013); its Subcommittee on Regional Economic Development (2013–2017); and the Audit Committee (since 2025). An alternate member of the Budget Committee, he also serves as his parliamentary group's rapporteur on the annual budget of the Federal Court of Audit.

== Other activities ==
- University of Applied Sciences, Worms, Member of the Advisory Board on International Management

== Political positions ==
During the election campaign, Metzler opposed income tax rises and the creation of a national minimum wage, arguing that collective bargaining by trade unions was a better way to achieve minimum wage standards than have it set by politicians. He also called for greater support for middle-class people and opposed further increases in inheritance tax.

In June 2017, Metzler voted against his parliamentary group’s majority and in favor of Germany’s introduction of same-sex marriage.
