= Bechtheim =

- Municipality
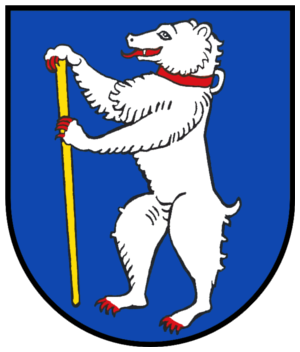
- Coat of arms

- Location of Bechtheim within Alzey-Worms district
- Interactive map of Bechtheim
- Location within Germany Location within Rhineland-Palatinate
- Coordinates: 49°43′40″N 8°17′32″E
- Country: Germany
- State: Rhineland-Palatinate
- District: Alzey-Worms
- Municipal assoc.: Wonnegau

Government
  - Mayor (2019–24): Jutta Schick

Area
  - Total: 13.34 km^{2} (5.15 sq mi)
- Elevation: 131 m (430 ft)

Population (2025-12-31)
  - Total: 1,855
  - Density: 139.1/km^{2} (360.2/sq mi)
- Time zone: UTC+01:00 (CET)
  - Summer (DST): UTC+02:00 (CEST)
- Postal codes: 67595
- Dialling codes: 06242
- Vehicle registration: AZ
- Website: www.bechtheim.de

Bechtheim is an Ortsgemeinde – a municipality belonging to a Verbandsgemeinde, a kind of collective municipality – in the Alzey-Worms district in Rhineland-Palatinate, Germany. It belongs to the Verbandsgemeinde of Wonnegau, whose seat is in Osthofen.

== History ==
The Frankish nobleman Bero supposedly took his lordly seat here in the 6th century and founded “Beroheim” (–heim means “home”), out of which developed Bechtheim. Saint Lambert's Basilica was founded in the 8th century by the Cathedral Foundation of Liège, in whose ownership the municipality found itself then.

In 793, Bechtheim had its first documentary mention in a document from Fulda Abbey. In the Lorsch codex the place was named in 1070. First the Lords of Bolanden and thereafter, as of 1267, the Counts of Leiningen held ownership rights to Bechtheim. The latter nobles pledged their holding several times. In 1700, the so-called Simultaneum was also introduced into Bechtheim, whereby Protestant churches could also be used by Catholics, although this spawned quarrels between the two denominations. In 1722, Bechtheim was granted market rights.

In 1934, a “wine partnership” was concluded with Erfurt. In 1964, through the association Heimattreue Erfurter (“Erfurters Loyal to the Homeland” – made up of those from Erfurt living in West Germany), contacts with Bechtheim were newly forged. In particular, the Martinsfest on 10 and 11 November was from then on jointly held in Bechtheim. After German reunification in 1990, the City of Erfurt also officially resumed the partnership.

The rural area toponym Pilgerpfad (“Pilgrims’ Path”) was first documented in 1392 as an dem bilgerim phade, and recalls a north-south route (from Bingen to Speyer) of Saint James's Way.

== Politics ==
=== Municipal council ===
The council is made up of 16 council members elected by proportional representation and the honorary mayor as chairwoman. The municipal election held on 7 June 2009 yielded the following results:

Year	SPD	CDU	FWG	Total
2009	3	7	6	16 seats
2004	4	7	5	16 seats

=== Mayors ===
- 1984 - 2009 Ortsbürgermeister Wolfgang Thomas (FWG)
- 2009–present Ortsbürgermeisterin Jutta Schick (FWG)

=== Coat of arms ===
The municipality's arms might be described thus: Azure a bear rampant argent armed, langued and gorged gules, in his paws a staff Or held palewise.

Bechtheim's oldest seal from about 1500 already shows the same charge as today's arms do, and as all others since this earliest known one have done, although the composition has not always been the same. For instance, in the late 19th century, the arms were Argent a bear rampant sable armed and langued gules (that is, a black bear on a silver background with red tongue and claws, and without the collar and the staff). Over the years, the bear gained a cherry in its mouth, now missing, and also the collar and the staff. It is possible that the bear is canting for an older form of the municipality's name, Berchtheim (“Bear” is Bär in German, pronounced like the first three sounds in the older name). The arms in their current form were conferred in 1958.

== Economy and infrastructure ==
=== Winegrowing ===
Bechtheim is characterized to a considerable extent by winegrowing, with 654 ha of vineyards under cultivation, 70.2% with white wine varieties and 29.8% with red. After Worms (1 490 ha), Nierstein (783 ha), Alzey (769 ha), Westhofen (764 ha) and Alsheim (704 ha), Bechtheim is Rhenish Hesse's sixth biggest winegrowing municipality, and one of the biggest in Rhineland-Palatinate.

=== Transport ===
There was once the railway line between Osthofen and Gau Odernheim.

== Famous people ==
- Jean-Valentin Bender (1801–1873), conductor and composer
- Siegmund Mayer (1842–1910), physiologist
- Joseph Simon (1851–1935), American politician (Republican Party)
