= Hochborn =

- Municipality
- Coat of arms

- Location of Hochborn within Alzey-Worms district
- Interactive map of Hochborn
- Location within Germany Location within Rhineland-Palatinate
- Coordinates: 49°43′26″N 8°12′03″E
- Country: Germany
- State: Rhineland-Palatinate
- District: Alzey-Worms
- Municipal assoc.: Wonnegau

Government
  - Mayor (2019–24): Ute Balz

Area
  - Total: 3.56 km^{2} (1.37 sq mi)
- Elevation: 290 m (950 ft)

Population (2025-12-31)
  - Total: 390
  - Density: 110/km^{2} (280/sq mi)
- Time zone: UTC+01:00 (CET)
  - Summer (DST): UTC+02:00 (CEST)
- Postal codes: 55234
- Dialling codes: 06735
- Vehicle registration: AZ
- Website: www.hochborn.de

Hochborn (German pronunciation: [ˈhoːxbɔʁn]; until 1971: Blödesheim) is an Ortsgemeinde – a municipality belonging to a Verbandsgemeinde, a kind of collective municipality – in the Alzey-Worms district in Rhineland-Palatinate, Germany.

This Ortsgemeinde earned a Germany-wide media presence in early 2001 when a television spot from the 1970s made by the then Südwestfunk was broadcast by Stefan Raab on his show TV total; it was about the place called Blödesheim. Stefan Raab then visited Hochborn during Carnival (locally known as Fastnachtszeit) and for a few weeks thereafter campaigned for a return to the name Blödesheim.

Blödes Heim in German means "dimwitted home".

== Geography ==
=== Location ===
The municipality lies in Rhenish Hesse and has roughly 500 inhabitants. It belongs to the Verbandsgemeinde of Wonnegau, whose seat is in Osthofen.

At 290 m above sea level, Hochborn is among the highest places in the Rheinhessisches Hügelland (Rhenish-Hessian Uplands). Even so, the municipality nevertheless has a wealth of water, which might account for the choice of the new name: the placename ending —born is a form of the German word Brunnen, which can mean "spring", "fountain" or "well". The word hoch means "high".

=== Climate ===
Yearly precipitation in Hochborn amounts to 541 mm, which is very low, falling into the lowest tenth of the precipitation chart for all Germany. Only at 9% of the German Weather Service’s weather stations are even lower figures recorded. The driest month is February. The most rainfall comes in July. In that month, precipitation is 1.9 times what it is in February. Precipitation varies moderately. At 34% of the weather stations, lower seasonal swings are recorded.

== History ==
In 782, Hochborn had its first documentary mention when Theo and Anthilde von Blatmarsheim (the last word being the village's original name) donated 15 Morgen of cropland and a meadow to Lorsch Abbey on 23 April that year. They further made over other holdings of theirs in Blatmarsheim to the Abbey, as described on 9 October 788. It is believed that the village's original name might have derived from the kin of a Frankish settler named Blatmar or Blitter.

Over the last 1,200 years, the municipality's name has changed several times. The last name change came on 1 March 1971 when the old name Blödesheim was dropped in favour of Hochborn. The change was approved by local voters with a margin of 96%. The old name had not only led to annoyance and teasing, but had also been hindering wine sales. The names borne by the village over the ages are:

- 782: Blatmarsheim
- 788: Blatmarisheim
- 789: Blittersheim
- 1070: Blettenesheim
- 1261: Bleidinsheim
- 1341: Bledinsheim
- 1348: Bledensheim
- 1427: Plödesheim
- 1497: Bledesheim
- 1602: Blödeßheim
- 1613: Blödesheim
- 1971: Hochborn

Not much else is known about Hochborn's history, likely because it was not only a very small place in days gone by, but also a very poor one.

== Politics ==
=== Municipal council ===
The council is made up of 8 council members, who were elected by majority vote at the municipal election held on 7 June 2009, and the honorary mayor as chairman.

=== Mayors ===
The office of mayor in Blödesheim, as it was then known, was not reinstituted after the Congress of Vienna until 1832. The municipality's mayors since then are:

- 1832–1837: Georg Ochs
- 1837–1843: Christian Jene
- 1843–1853: Jacob Claß
- 1853–1882: Georg Ochs (the first-named mayor’s son)
- 1883–1899: Philipp Schaffner
- 1899–1914: Peter Schaffner (Philipp’s son)
- 1914–1930: Jacob Jene II
- 1930–1945: Ludwig Claß
- 1945–1946: Jacob Flörsch and Peter Blum (provisional, after the defeat and before new elections)
- 1946–1974: Joh. Georg Dürkes
- 1974–1999: Ludwig Abel
- 1999–2004: Kurt Knell
- 2004–2019: Herwarth Mankel
- since 2019: Ute Balz

=== Coat of arms ===
The municipality’s arms might be described thus: Per fess sable a demi-lion rampant Or armed and langued gules, and argent five oakleaves erect in fess, the second and fourth abased, vert.

The lion is the Palatine Lion.

== Culture and sightseeing ==
=== Buildings ===
- Saint Lawrence’s Evangelical Church (Laurentiuskirche) was built or at least first mentioned in the historical record in 1070 as the Kapelle von Blettenesheim (“Chapel of Blettenesheim”).
- On Langgasse (lane) is found a warrior’s memorial.

== Economy and infrastructure ==
Hochborn is one of only three places in Rhenish Hesse that have no winegrowing within their own limits.

=== Transport ===
The Autobahn A 61 can be reached by way of Alzey.
