= Frettenheim =

- Municipality
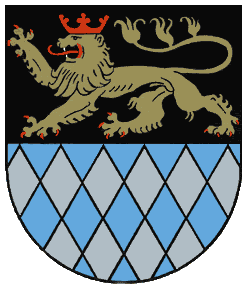
- Coat of arms

- Location of Frettenheim within Alzey-Worms district
- Interactive map of Frettenheim
- Location within Germany Location within Rhineland-Palatinate
- Coordinates: 49°45′35″N 8°14′41″E
- Country: Germany
- State: Rhineland-Palatinate
- District: Alzey-Worms
- Municipal assoc.: Wonnegau

Government
  - Mayor (2019–24): Carsten Claß

Area
  - Total: 2.74 km^{2} (1.06 sq mi)
- Elevation: 171 m (561 ft)

Population (2025-12-31)
  - Total: 311
  - Density: 114/km^{2} (294/sq mi)
- Time zone: UTC+01:00 (CET)
  - Summer (DST): UTC+02:00 (CEST)
- Postal codes: 67596
- Dialling codes: 06733
- Vehicle registration: AZ
- Website: www.vg-wonnegau.de

Frettenheim is an Ortsgemeinde – a municipality belonging to a Verbandsgemeinde, a kind of collective municipality – in the Alzey-Worms district in Rhineland-Palatinate, Germany.

== Geography ==
=== Location ===
The municipality lies in Rhenish Hesse. It belongs to the Verbandsgemeinde of Wonnegau, whose seat is in Osthofen.

=== Neighbouring municipalities ===
Frettenheim’s neighbours are Dittelsheim-Heßloch, Dorn-Dürkheim, Gau-Odernheim and Hillesheim.

== History ==
In 767, Frettenheim had its first documentary mention in the Lorsch codex. It then still bore the name Frittenheim, as the founder who built his farm there was named Frido. Only in 1402 did Frettenheim get its current name.

In 1575, Frettenheim became part of Electoral Palatinate. Beginning in 1755, the Barons of Heddersdorf were tithe lords. In 1792, Frettenheim lay under French administration and belonged to the Department of Mont-Tonnerre (or Donnersberg in German).

In 1816 came the transfer to the Grand Duchy of Hesse. Frettenheim became autonomous in 1868.

=== Population development ===
In 1772, the population amounted to 90 persons. Since then, the figure has risen to almost fourfold. The municipality is among the smallest Ortsgemeinden in the district.

== Politics ==
=== Municipal council ===
The council is made up of 8 council members, who were elected by proportional representation at the municipal election held on 7 June 2009, and the honorary mayor as chairman.

The municipal election held on 7 June 2009 yielded the following results:

Year	SPD	CDU	FWG	Total
2009	2	3	3	8 seats
2004	2	3	3	8 seats

=== Mayors ===
Frettenheim’s Ortsbürgermeister (mayor) is Carsten Claß (independent), who was elected in May 2019.

Previous mayors were:

- Bernd Weber (FWG), 2006–2019
- Heinz Martin (SPD), until 2006

$$\vdots$$

- Wendelin Mathias Kiefer, first to hold office, 1868

=== Coat of arms ===
The municipality’s arms might be described thus: Per fess, sable a lion passant Or armed, langued and crowned gules, and lozengy argent and azure.

== Culture and sightseeing ==
=== Buildings ===
The little municipality has at its disposal two Baroque churches and a Dorfgemeinschaftshaus (village hall), which until 1967 was used as a school, having been given its current function in 1981.

- The tithe barn is from the 18th century.
- Saint George’s Catholic Church (St.-Georg-Kirche) was built in 1749. The altar comes from the Princely Chapel at Mainz.
- The Evangelical church was built in 1755.

== Economy and infrastructure ==
In 2006, the municipality counted seven full-time farmers.

=== Transport ===
Beginning in 1897, the Osthofen–Gau-Odernheim railway line led through Frettenheim, over which there were links to Worms at Osthofen and to the Alzey–Bodenheim railway (known locally as the Amiche) at Gau Odernheim; however, it has been out of service since the mid-1980s.
