= Johann Weißheimer II =

German politician (1797–1883)

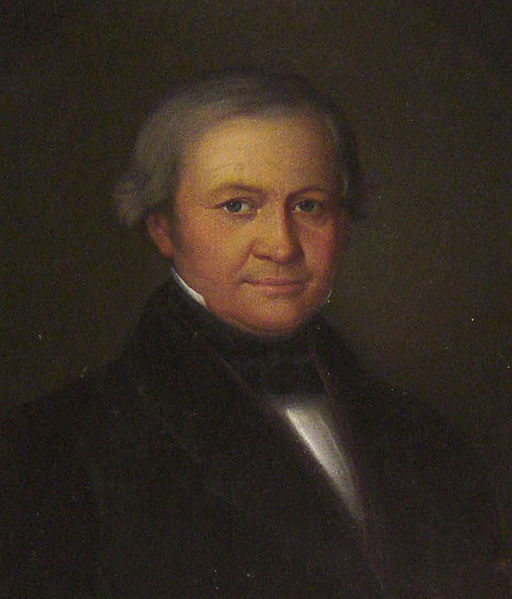
Johann Weißheimer II, 1854 oil painting by Hebel.

Johann Weißheimer II (1797-1883) was the father of the composer Wendelin Weißheimer. Around the middle of the 19th century, he was one of the most heavily taxed landowners in Rheinhessen. He was also a politician and mayor of Osthofen in the first chamber stalls of the Hesse state parliament during the 1848 revolution.

His extensive diaries tell nearly 80 years of his life, documenting economic, political, social and climatic conditions. They are considered the most important primary sources about Osthofen and also of the Rhenish-Hessian history in the 19th century. Because of his extensive studies, he is also called the "chronicler" of Osthofen.

== Life ==
Johann Weißheimer II was born on 25 October 1797 in Osthofen as the eldest son of John I and Margaret Weißheimer, née Dechen, in his father's estate, the stone mill in Osthofen. Shortly before he celebrated his wedding with Ottilia Best, the daughter of the Osthofener proprietor of the Swan Inn and future mayor Wendelin Best, he managed to transfer to the stone mill the associated goods in the ownership of his family through the gradual acquisition of fields and vineyards, thus making the stone mill to become one of the most important companies in the Rhenish Hesse. In his 1500-page diary, he reported in detail over 70 years of his life.

== Career ==
He made the stone mill in Osthofen, around the middle of the 19th century, the most important estate in the Rhenish Hesse. It is thanks to him that his youngest son Wendelin Weißheimer could begin studying music, laying so the foundation stone for his career. Encouraged by him, Johann Weißheimer II often contributed significantly by providing financial assistance to the composer Richard Wagner so, enabling him to set a foothold in Germany.

As mayor of Osthofen from 1831–1842, he led many reforms such as the introduction of the volunteer fire department and a charity fund. Osthofen was for the first time during his term of office, extended beyond its medieval boundaries. As a member of the first Hessian Chamber he took in Darmstadt, during the 1848 revolution, the interests of his home and suggested reforms, later becoming High Commissioner and permanent member of the City Council. He died in his hometown in 1883 leaving for posterity extensive studies of more than 2000 pages which are among the most important sources about the history of Osthofen from the Middle Ages to the 19th century.

== Works ==
- Historical information about Osthofen, 3 vols (unpublished)
- Historical information about Westhofen, (unpublished)
- My Diary 4 vols (unpublished)

== Additional informations ==
=== Sources ===
- Wendelin Weißheimer: Experiences with Richard Wagner, Franz Liszt and many other contemporaries, Frankfurt / Leipzig 1898
- Henry Beckenbach: Wendelin Weißheimer, one Rhein-hessen conductor and composer, 1958
- City of Osthofen (ed.): 1200 years of Osthofen - On the trail of the past, Osthofen 1984
- Brigitte Kazenwadel-Drew: Osthofen - A walk through history, Heidelberg 2006

=== References ===
Attribution

- This article is based on the translation of the corresponding article of the German Wikipedia. A list of contributors can be found there at the History section.
