= Spundekäs =

Rhenish Hessian cheese specialty

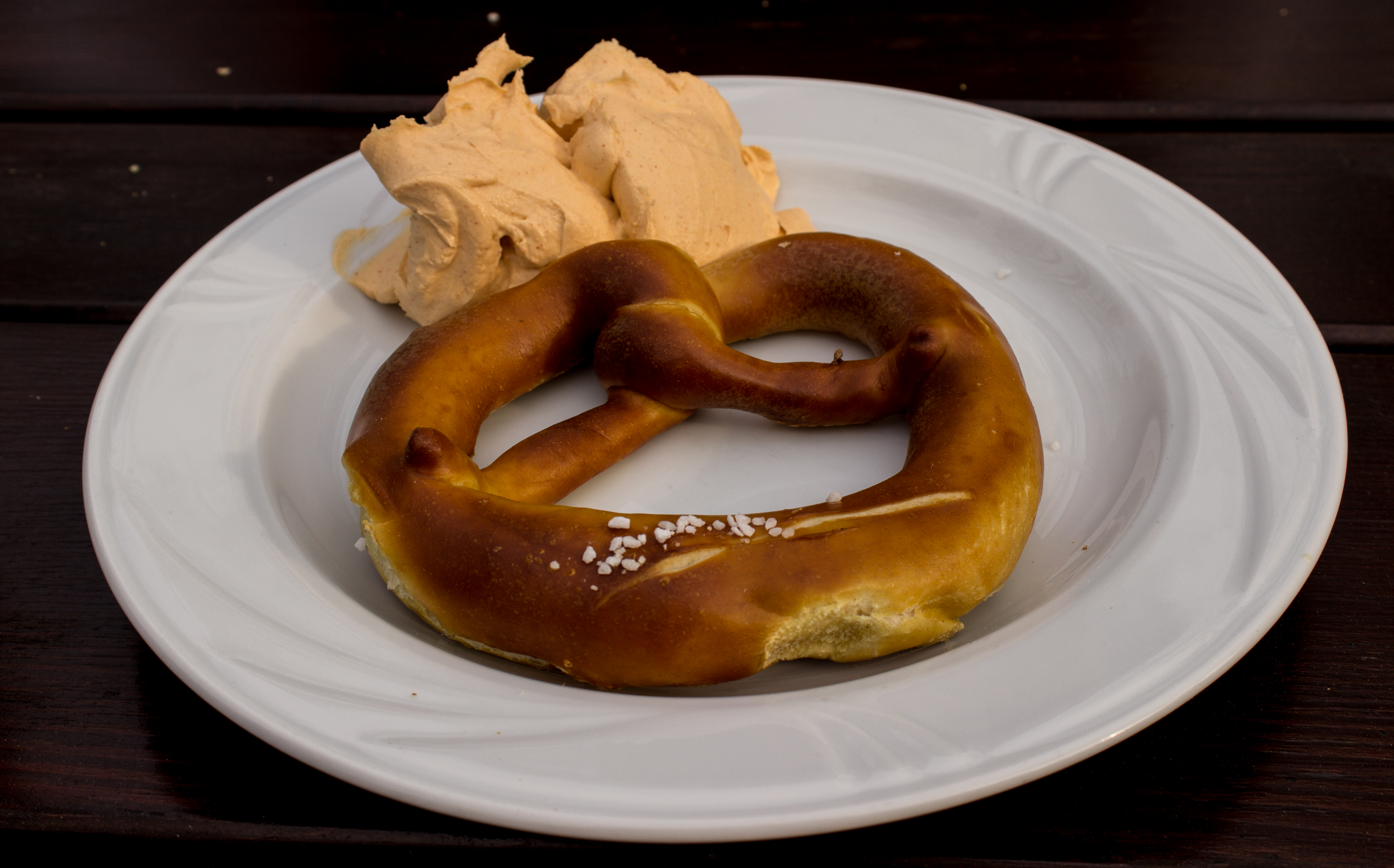
- Simple Spundekäs and pretzel arrangement
- Country of origin: Germany
- Region: Rhenish Hesse
- Source of milk: fresh cheese, quark
- Pasteurized: yes
- Texture: soft

Spundekäs [ˈʃpʊndəˌkɛːs] is a spiced cream cheese spread originating from the German region of Northern Rhenish Hesse. Often served as an appetizer (especially at Straußenwirtschaften) or at gatherings, usually along with lye rolls or soft pretzels as well as regional wine, it remains a symbol of regional cultural expression.

== Etymology ==
The name Spundekäs is derived from the shape in which the cream cheese was arranged on a person's plate: The elongated, cone-like spread was deemed reminiscent of the stoppers used to plug bungholes in wine barrels, called Spund in German. Käs is the term for cheese in the regional Hessian dialect. The word Spundekäs as a whole is considered part of a dialect specific to the city of Mainz.

== Production ==
Unlike comparable German spiced cream cheeses like Obatzda, Spundekäs is not covered by national or supranational geographical indication or traditional specialty protection and thus lacks specific guidelines for its production and sale. It is classified as a fresh cheese due to water content in the fat-free cheese mass exceeding 73%.

The cream cheese Spundekäs typically consists of a dairy mixture of unseasoned cream cheese and curd cheese. Its signature light orange or pinkish hue with tiny red speckles stems from the added spices, namely salt, sweet paprika and onion. Aside from these base ingredients, variations of the cheese are fairly common, with very little agreement on what constitutes "true" Spundekäs. Recipes may additionally include dairy products like sour cream and butter and/or spices like garlic, mustard, cayenne pepper, black pepper, bell pepper, caper and anchovy paste.

== History ==
Cheese production in Rhenish Hesse has traditionally been comparatively uncommon and limited to a smaller scale. The same climate conditions enabling large-scale wine cultivation in the region simply rendered alternative dairy use, such as butter, more attractive.

The precise origin of Spundekäs within the region is subject of debate, with Mainz and various towns in Palatinate and Rheingau claiming to be its birthplace. The most widely accepted origin story was proposed by Mainz-Altstadt-born author de:Karl Schramm in his Mainzer Wörterbuch, according to which the original recipe can be traced back to landlady Geiger, keeper of the inn and brewery "Zum Birnbaum" in the early 20th century, essentially coinciding with the origin of the Mainz carnival association. As a predecessor to Spundekäs, a similar cream cheese called Siebkäse (strained curd cheese with salt, caraway and egg) is known to have been consumed by traveling merchants and ferrymen in Palatinate, Rhenish Hesse and Rheingau. But written documentation of it is rare due to its original status as less desirable peasant food, as hinted at by folk rhymes passed down via word of mouth. One example of these may include "Wann alles rar un deier is, dann esse mer waasche Kees" (lit: When everything's rare and expensive, then we eat cream cheese).

Siebkäse and later Spundekäs were usually eaten as packed lunch wrapped in chestnut or wine leaves and consumed in combination with bread, onions and wine.

Its modern widespread popularity in the region is a more recent development, with adoption at Straußenwirtschaften especially only gaining traction in the 1970s and 1980s.

Since the early 2000s, large-scale commercial production by the dairy industry has led to ready-made Spundekäs tubs being offered at German supermarket chains like Edeka and REWE. Manufacturer de:Schwälbchen Molkerei in particular claims to be responsible for a resurgence in the cheese's popularity.

== Cultural impact ==
Ein jeder wääß, zum achte Gläsje
Gehört dem Mensch e Spundekäsje.
Des reizt de Gaume, stärkt de Mage –
Korz, mer kann widder ään vertrage!"

Everyone knows that with every eighth glass
a person deserves a Spundekäs.
It stimulates the palate, strengthens the stomach –
To enable you to drink one more!

— Adolf Gottron, honorary president of the Mombach carnival association

Since its 1970s surge in popularity, Spundekäs along with pretzels and wine has become the main culinary symbol of the Rhenish Hesse region. This has been expressed both outwardly by international tourism advertising, as well as within regional cultural events: Aside from becoming a mainstay in local gastronomy and dialect poetry being dedicated to the cheese (see quote), competing recipes for Spundekäs have become the subject of annual talent shows in the region. Examples of this include Rheingau sucht den Superspundekäs – RSDS (lit.: Rheingau is looking for the supreme Spundekäs), a satirical nod to the German singing talent show Deutschland sucht den Superstar – DSDS or the Hochheimer Spundekäs-Wettbewerb.

On the online food guide TasteAtlas, Meenzer Spundekäs is among the 50 highest user-ranked dips in the world.

In Mainz, select ice cream parlors have offered Spundekäs as an ice cream flavor.

== See also ==
- List of German cheeses
- List of cheeses
- List of spreads
