= Hangen-Weisheim =

- Municipality
- Coat of arms

- Location of Hangen-Weisheim within Alzey-Worms district
- Interactive map of Hangen-Weisheim
- Location within Germany Location within Rhineland-Palatinate
- Coordinates: 49°42′37″N 8°11′01″E
- Country: Germany
- State: Rhineland-Palatinate
- District: Alzey-Worms
- Municipal assoc.: Wonnegau

Government
  - Mayor (2019–24): Harald Pflaume

Area
  - Total: 4.60 km^{2} (1.78 sq mi)
- Elevation: 222 m (728 ft)

Population (2025-12-31)
  - Total: 413
  - Density: 89.8/km^{2} (233/sq mi)
- Time zone: UTC+01:00 (CET)
  - Summer (DST): UTC+02:00 (CEST)
- Postal codes: 55234
- Dialling codes: 06735
- Vehicle registration: AZ
- Website: hangen-weisheim.de

Hangen-Weisheim is an Ortsgemeinde – a municipality belonging to a Verbandsgemeinde, a kind of collective municipality – in the Alzey-Worms district in Rhineland-Palatinate, Germany.

== Geography ==
=== Location ===
The municipality lies in Rhenish Hesse and belongs to the Verbandsgemeinde of Wonnegau, whose seat is in Osthofen.

== History ==
In 773, Hangen-Weisheim had its first documentary mention.

== Politics ==
=== Municipal council ===
The council is made up of 12 council members, who were elected by majority vote at the municipal election held on 7 June 2009, and the honorary mayor as chairman.

The municipal council has formed four boards: the building board, the agriculture, winegrowing, environment and graveyard board, the accounting control board and the grape harvest board, thereby showing the municipality's prevailing character as a winegrowing centre, with boards for both winegrowing and the grape harvest.

=== Coat of arms ===
The municipality's arms might be described thus: Per fess gules the letter W surmounted by the letter H, except on the latter's cross stroke where the former surmounts it argent, and lozengy argent and azure, in base a mount of three vert.

== Economy and infrastructure ==
Hangen-Weisheim's economy is overwhelmingly based on agriculture. Besides the six businesses whose main line of work is agriculture and the many wineries and farms run as sidelines, there are also a woodworking shop, a roofing business, an institute for foot care, a carpentry shop, an engine-building business, a roof cleaning business, an insurance agency, a housewares shop, a country inn, a hairdresser, a restaurant at the municipal hall and a buchter's shop also featuring imported items and baked goods. For major purchases, however, such as textiles or furniture, people from Hangen-Weisheim must usually go to the surrounding service-industry centres like Alzey, Worms, Mainz or Mannheim
