= Gundersheim =

- Municipality
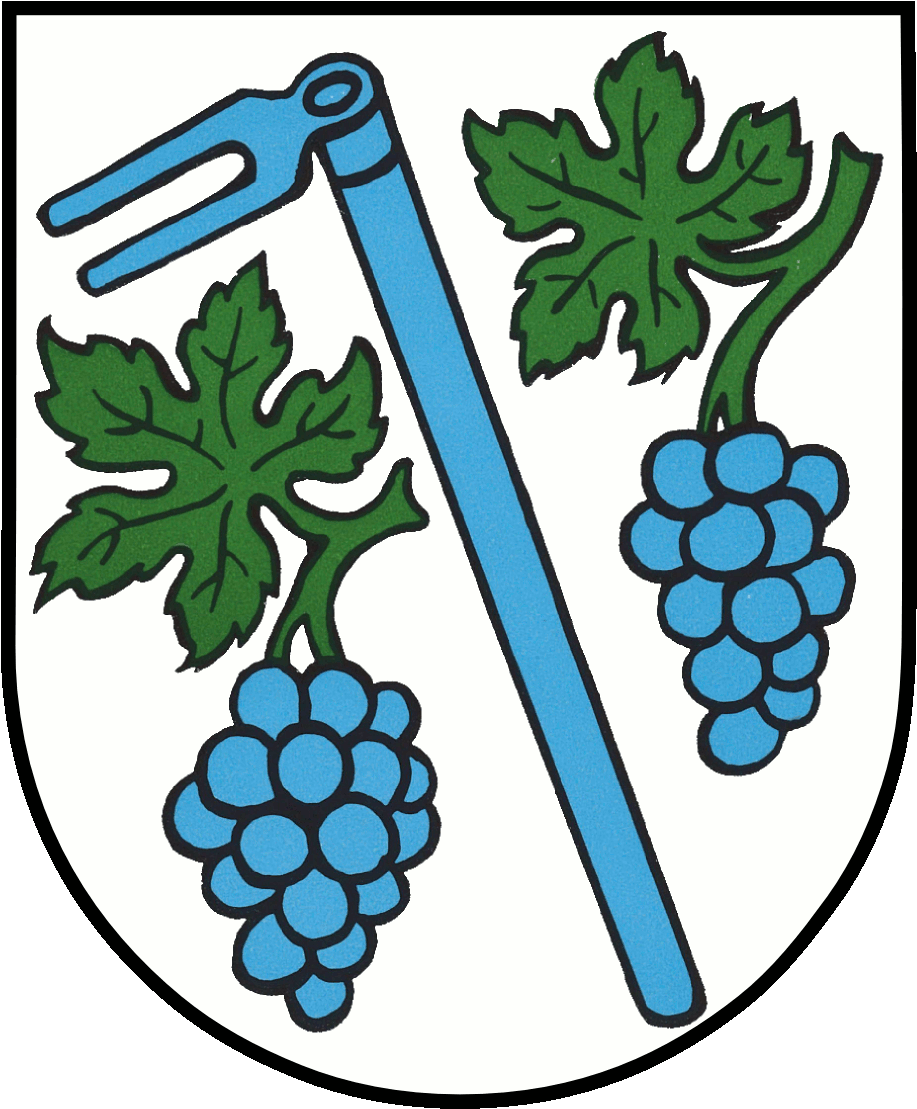
- Coat of arms

- Location of Gundersheim within Alzey-Worms district
- Interactive map of Gundersheim
- Location within Germany Location within Rhineland-Palatinate
- Coordinates: 49°41′46″N 8°12′09″E
- Country: Germany
- State: Rhineland-Palatinate
- District: Alzey-Worms
- Municipal assoc.: Wonnegau

Government
  - Mayor (2019–24): Joachim Mayer (SPD)

Area
  - Total: 8.63 km^{2} (3.33 sq mi)
- Elevation: 152 m (499 ft)

Population (2025-12-31)
  - Total: 1,498
  - Density: 174/km^{2} (450/sq mi)
- Time zone: UTC+01:00 (CET)
  - Summer (DST): UTC+02:00 (CEST)
- Postal codes: 67598
- Dialling codes: 06244
- Vehicle registration: AZ
- Website: www.gundersheim.de

Gundersheim (German pronunciation: [ˈɡʊndɐshaɪm]) is an Ortsgemeinde – a municipality belonging to a Verbandsgemeinde, a kind of collective municipality – in the Alzey-Worms district in Rhineland-Palatinate, Germany.

== Geography ==
=== Location ===
As a winegrowing centre, Gundersheim lies in Germany's biggest winegrowing district and in the middle of the Rheinhessen wine region. It belongs to the Verbandsgemeinde of Wonnegau, whose seat is in Osthofen.

=== Constituent communities ===
Gundersheim has an outlying centre called Enzheim, which was once a separate municipality.

== History ==
In 769, Gundersheim had its first documentary mention in a donation document from Lorsch Abbey (Codex Laureshamensis Nr. 920). Even the Weißenburg Monastery in Alsace owned a lordly estate in the municipality in the 9th century, of which there is documentary proof. In the late 10th century, the Weißenburg holding became Salian property, and then a Staufer holding. From the High Middle Ages, the ownership passed from one noble family to another at a quicker pace. Among others, the Raugraves, Waldgraves and Rhinegraves, the Palatine Electors, the Dukes of Nassau and the Counts of Sponheim each had a share in the municipality. In 1475, Gundersheim became a wholly Electoral Palatinate holding, governed as part of the Oberamt of Alzey. With the French occupation of the Palatinate on the Rhine’s left bank in 1797, the municipality became part of the Department of Mont-Tonnerre (or Donnersberg in German). After the Congress of Vienna, it belonged to the Grand Duchy of Hesse, and as of 1918 it was part of the People's State of Hesse. In 1946, it passed along with the former Hessian province of Rhenish Hesse (Rheinhessen) to the newly formed state of Rhineland-Palatinate.

=== Religion ===
Gundersheim has at its disposal an Evangelical church and a Catholic church. The Reformation was established by Frederick II, Elector Palatine in 1546. The greater part of the population is overwhelmingly Evangelical.

== Politics ==
=== Municipal council ===
The council is made up of 16 council members, who were elected at the municipal election held on 7 June 2009, and the honorary mayor as chairman.

The municipal election held on 7 June 2009 yielded the following results:

	SPD	CDU	FDP	Total
2009	8	6	2	16 seats
2004	8	6	2	16 seats
1999	9	5	2	16 seats

=== Coat of arms ===
The municipality's arms might be described thus: Argent a prong hoe bendwise azure between two bunches of grapes of the same slipped and leafed vert.

== Culture and sightseeing ==
=== Buildings ===
- Catholic church with Late Gothic chancel and sacristy from 1492. The tower is from the years 1521 to 1524. The church's three-naved main body was built in 1911 in Gothic Revival style.
- Evangelical church built in 1726, and the tower in 1891.
- Warriors’ memorial from 1870 to 1871, created by sculptor J. Sipp with a statue of Germania on the pedestal.

=== Natural monuments ===
In the former limestone quarries is found the Rosengarten (“Rose Garden”) Conservation Area.

=== Sport ===
The Turnverein Gundersheim 1863 e.V. (gymnastic club) is the oldest club in the municipality. It has departments for, among other things, aerobics, jazz dance, gymnastics and health sports and badminton. Since 1920, there has also been the Verein für Leibesübungen (VfL) Gundersheim (“Club for bodily exercise”), which currently has about 430 members, and departments for football, table tennis and gymnastics.

=== Regular events ===
- At Corpus Christi, the local volunteer fire brigade and its associated promotional club have a one-day open house.
- During the summer, several winemakers take turns opening their wineries for visitors to come and look, and taste the wines.
- Each year on the last weekend in August, the Rotweinkerwe (“Red Wine Fair”) is held.

== Economy and infrastructure ==
=== Transport ===
Gundersheim lies on the Autobahn A 61 and has at its disposal its own interchange southeast of the Alzey Autobahn cross, through which the A 63 can also be reached. It also has its own railway station on the Worms–Bingen Stadt railway with half-hourly trains to either Alzey or Worms. At the sporting ground is one of the municipality's two bus stops.

=== Economy ===
The municipality has been characterized by winegrowing over the ages. Even today there are a few wineries. In the latter half of the 19th century there were two match factories, although these both went out of business about 1890. Of greater importance was the limestone quarry, which until 1955 was run as the Gundersheimer Kalkwerke by Südzucker AG in Offstein, and until then was the biggest employer in the municipality.

As well, there is a commercial development with various businesses in, among other things, logistics, services and production.

=== Public institutions ===
==== Freiwillige Feuerwehr Gundersheim ====
The volunteer fire brigade currently has at its disposal more than 32 active and 10 youth members. The active department practises every fortnight with the four available firefighting vehicles (LF 8/6, STW 1000, TSF, HVO-PKW). Moreover, there is here, as there is throughout almost all of Germany, a readiness on the brigade's part to be called to duty at any time. That is to say, the brigade's active members carry a pager which is triggered in an emergency, bringing all available firefighters – a number that can be reduced by commuters or by employers who will not comply – to the fire station to be ready to move out.

Furthermore, the Gundersheim volunteer fire brigade also has at its disposal a Helfer vor Ort group, a team of certified first responders who also spring into action through pager alerts to deal with medical emergencies in their emergency medical vehicles, which they get from the German Red Cross’s Alzey district chapter. These certified first responders currently number 16 – 15 men and 1 woman – and also form part of the Schnelleinsatzgruppe (SEG – “Fast Deployment Group”) with the German Red Cross's Alzey district chapter, along with which the Helfer vor Ort are called to duty and health service.

=== Education ===
==== Kindergarten ====
There is one kindergarten, which owing to recent increased interest has been expanded.

==== Grundschule Gundersheim ====
The primary school in Gundersheim is attended by children from Bermersheim as well as Gundersheim.
