= Monzernheim =

- Municipality
- Coat of arms

- Location of Monzernheim within Alzey-Worms district
- Interactive map of Monzernheim
- Location within Germany Location within Rhineland-Palatinate
- Coordinates: 49°43′17″N 8°13′42″E
- Country: Germany
- State: Rhineland-Palatinate
- District: Alzey-Worms
- Municipal assoc.: Wonnegau

Government
  - Mayor (2019–24): Ansgar Münnemann

Area
  - Total: 3.95 km^{2} (1.53 sq mi)
- Elevation: 219 m (719 ft)

Population (2025-12-31)
  - Total: 532
  - Density: 135/km^{2} (349/sq mi)
- Time zone: UTC+01:00 (CET)
  - Summer (DST): UTC+02:00 (CEST)
- Postal codes: 55234
- Dialling codes: 06244
- Vehicle registration: AZ
- Website: www.monzernheim.de

Monzernheim is an Ortsgemeinde – a municipality belonging to a Verbandsgemeinde, a kind of collective municipality – in the Alzey-Worms district in Rhineland-Palatinate, Germany.

== History ==
Monzernheim is mentioned in the Wormser wall-building ordinance from around 900 as one of the places that shared responsibility for maintaining the city wall of Worms.

== Geography ==
=== Location ===
As a winegrowing centre, Monzernheim lies in Germany's biggest winegrowing district, in the middle of Rhenish Hesse. It belongs to the Verbandsgemeinde of Wonnegau, whose seat is in Osthofen.

== Politics ==
=== Municipal council ===
The council is made up of 12 council members, who were elected by majority vote at the municipal election held on 7 June 2009, and the honorary mayor as chairman.

=== Coat of arms ===
The municipality's arms might be described thus: Per fess sable a demi-lion rampant Or armed, langued and crowned gules, and argent a bunch of grapes palewise leafed of two and couped vert.
