= Wonnegau =

Municipality in Germany

- Verbandsgemeinde
- Location of Wonnegau within Alzey-Worms district
- Interactive map of Wonnegau
- Location within Germany Location within Rhineland-Palatinate
- Coordinates: 49°42′N 8°20′E
- Country: Germany
- State: Rhineland-Palatinate
- District: Alzey-Worms
- Seat: Osthofen
- Subdivisions: 11 municipalities

Area
  - Total: 90.94 km^{2} (35.11 sq mi)

Population (2025-12-31)
  - Total: 21,396
  - Density: 235.3/km^{2} (609.4/sq mi)
- Time zone: UTC+01:00 (CET)
  - Summer (DST): UTC+02:00 (CEST)
- Website: www.vg-wonnegau.de

Wonnegau is a Verbandsgemeinde ("collective municipality") in the district Alzey-Worms, Rhineland-Palatinate, Germany. It takes its name from the larger historical area Wonnegau, which covers the southern part of Rhenish Hesse. The seat of the Verbandsgemeinde is in Osthofen.

The Verbandsgemeinde Wonnegau consists of the following Ortsgemeinden ("local municipalities"):

1. Bechtheim
2. Bermersheim
3. Dittelsheim-Heßloch
4. Frettenheim
5. Gundersheim
6. Gundheim
7. Hangen-Weisheim
8. Hochborn
9. Monzernheim
10. Osthofen
11. Westhofen
