= Jakob Becker =

German artist (1810–1872)

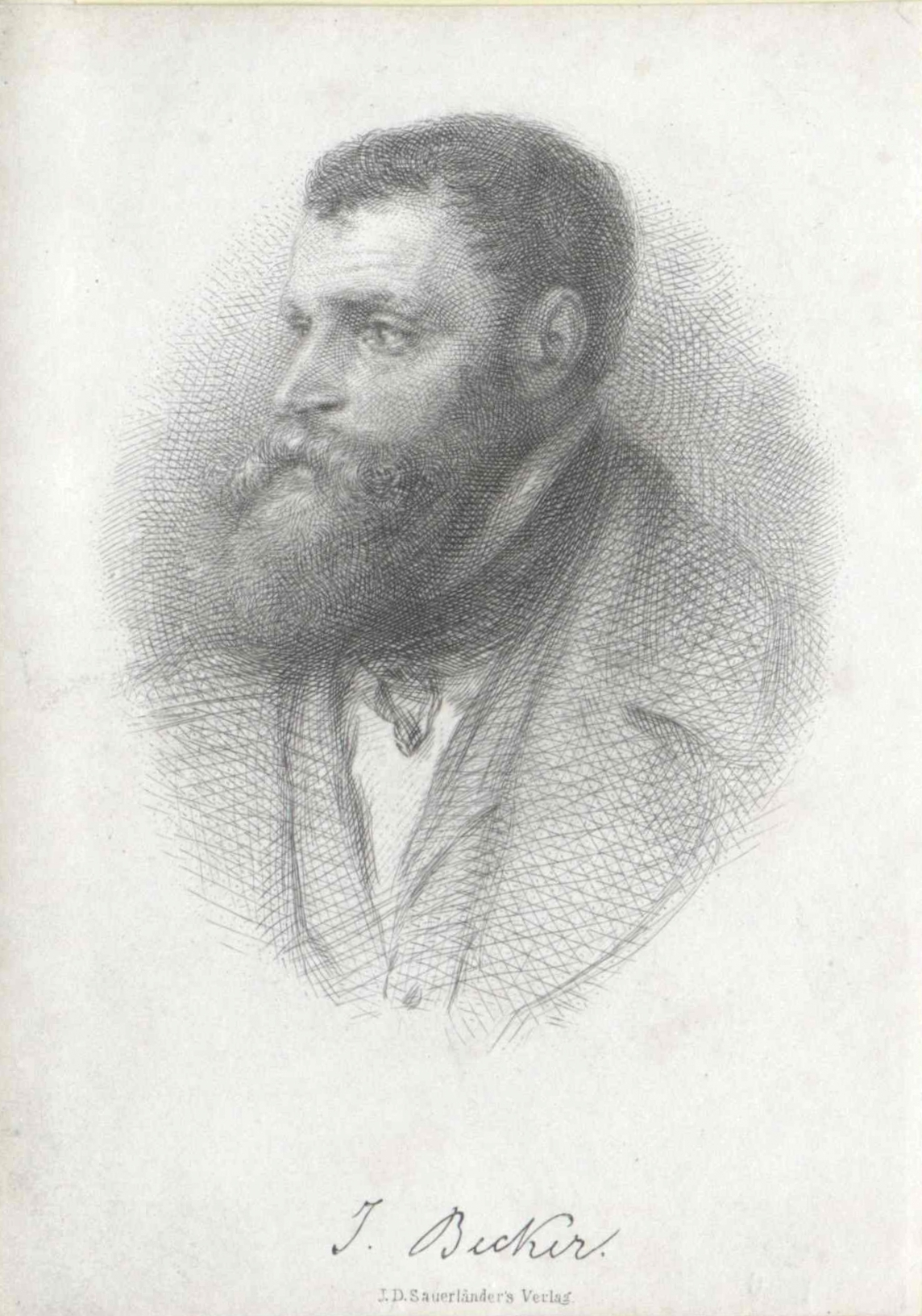
Jakob Becker, by an unknown artist

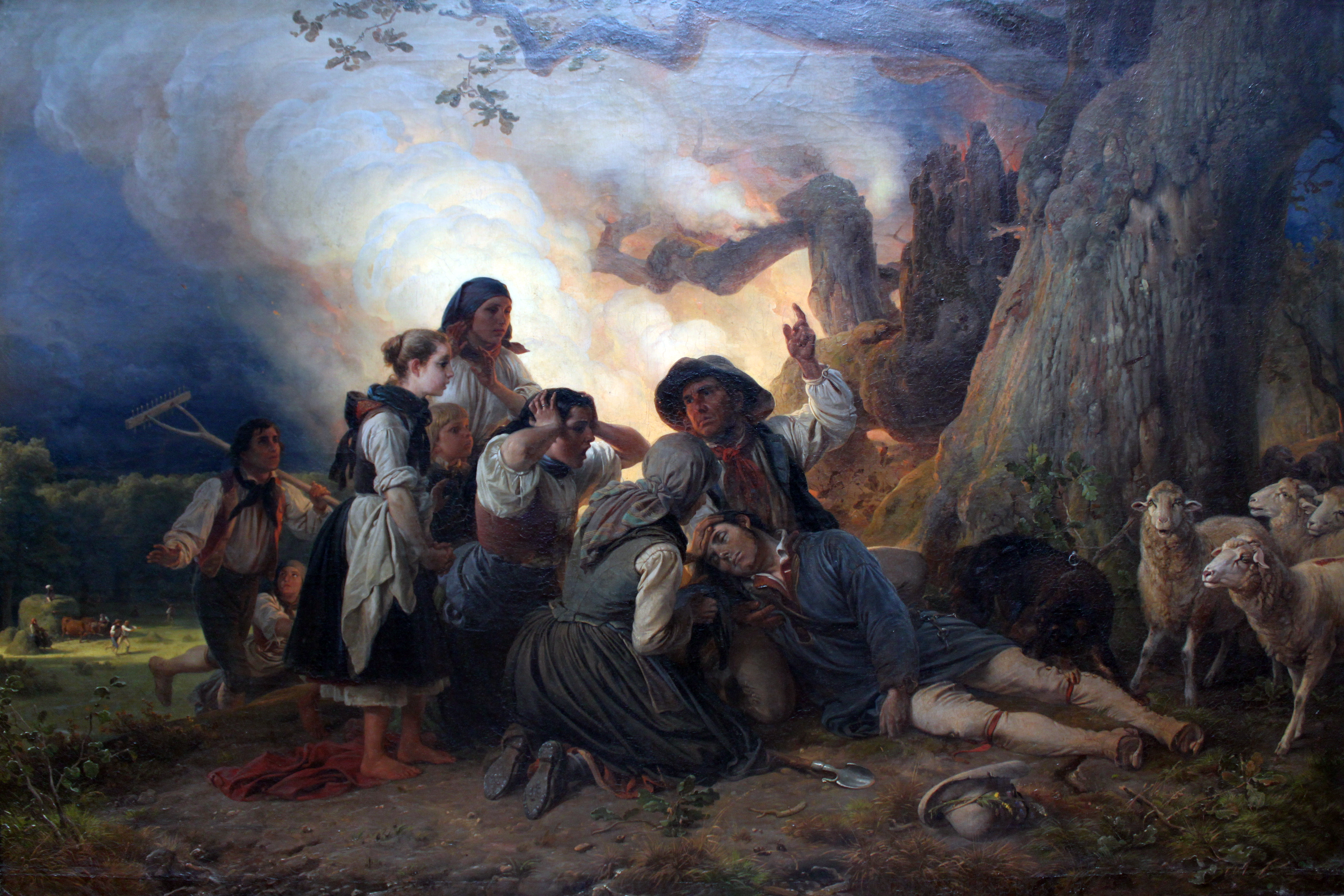
The Shepherd Struck by Lightning (1844)

Jakob Becker (15 March 1810 – 22 December 1872) was a German artist noted mainly for his genre paintings of peasants.

== Biography ==
He was born in Dittelsheim at Worms, and began his studies with Franz Nikolaus Jung in Worms. When he was 17 years old he started to work as a lithographer. His first important work was a panorama over the Rhine from Mainz to Cologne. Between 1833 and 1841 Becker studied at the Academy of Art in Düsseldorf; his professors were Johann Wilhelm Schirmer and Wilhelm von Schadow. In 1842 he became professor of genre painting and landscape painting at the Städelschule in Frankfurt.

== Art ==
Becker is associated with the Düsseldorf school of painting. He broke with the lofty attitude of much Biblical historical painting in the Städel creating his profane scenes. As the first professor of landscape and genre painting, he sought his subjects in the countryside and was especially interested in the social problems of the peasantry. He used much realistic detail and emotional gesture. One of his best-known works was Praying Peasant Family.

He was also open to French influences. In 1858 he offered to share his studio with Gustave Courbet and – despite having to endure some rudeness from the French artist – Becker accepted some of his stylistic influences.

Becker taught successfully at the academy for thirty years. Some of his pupils were to form the Kronberg Painters' Colony one generation later.

Becker died in Frankfurt am Main on 22 December 1872.

== See also ==
- List of German painters

== Literature ==
- Wolfgang Metternich: Jakob Becker, der Lehrer der Kronberger Maler (Jakob Becker, teacher of the Kronberg painters). Museumsgesellschaft Kronberg e.V. Frankfurt am Main. Kramer Verlag, 1991
- Wolfgang Metternich: Der Maler Jakob Becker. Ein Frankfurter Lehrer und Wegbereiter im 19. Jahrhundert (The painter Jakob Becker. A teacher of Frankfurt and 19th-century pioneer). Exhibition at the corporate museum of Hoechst AG at Höchster Schloss, 17 March 1985 to 20 April 1985. Hoechst AG, Frankfurt a. M., 1985
- Gilman, D. C.; Peck, H. T.; Colby, F. M., eds. (1905). "Becker, Jakob" . New International Encyclopedia (1st ed.). New York: Dodd, Mead.
