= Gundheim =

- Municipality
- Coat of arms

- Location of Gundheim within Alzey-Worms district
- Interactive map of Gundheim
- Location within Germany Location within Rhineland-Palatinate
- Coordinates: 49°40′33″N 8°14′16″E
- Country: Germany
- State: Rhineland-Palatinate
- District: Alzey-Worms
- Municipal assoc.: Wonnegau

Government
  - Mayor (2019–24): Michael Leidemer (CDU)

Area
  - Total: 4.61 km^{2} (1.78 sq mi)
- Elevation: 127 m (417 ft)

Population (2025-12-31)
  - Total: 987
  - Density: 214/km^{2} (555/sq mi)
- Time zone: UTC+01:00 (CET)
  - Summer (DST): UTC+02:00 (CEST)
- Postal codes: 67599
- Dialling codes: 06244
- Vehicle registration: AZ
- Website: www.gundheim.de

Gundheim (German pronunciation: [ˈɡʊnthaɪm]) is an Ortsgemeinde – a municipality belonging to a Verbandsgemeinde, a kind of collective municipality – in the Alzey-Worms district in Rhineland-Palatinate, Germany.

== Geography ==
=== Location ===
The municipality lies in Rhenish Hesse and is a winegrowing centre. It belongs to the Verbandsgemeinde of Wonnegau, whose seat is in Osthofen.

== History ==
In 774, Gundheim had its first documentary mention in a document from Lorsch Abbey.

== Politics ==
=== Municipal council ===
The council is made up of 12 council members, who were elected at the municipal election held on 7 June 2009, and the honorary mayor as chairman.

The municipal election held on 7 June 2009 yielded the following results:

	SPD	CDU	FWG	Total
2004	3	7	2	12 seats
2009	4	5	3	12 seats

=== Coat of arms ===
The municipality's arms might be described thus: Azure a talon Or barwise unguled gules, issuant from the top three plumes argent.

What appears on the escutcheon is a canting charge for the noble family that was enfeoffed with Gundheim in 1699. It bore the name Greiffenclau, rather reminiscent of the German words greifen (“grasp” or “seize”) and Klaue (“claw”).

== Wineries ==
Well known Gundheim wineries in the Bergkloster winemaking appellation – Weingroßlage – in the Wonnegau are:

- Hungerbien
- Mandelbrunnen
- Sonnenberg
