= Dittelsheim-Heßloch =

- Municipality
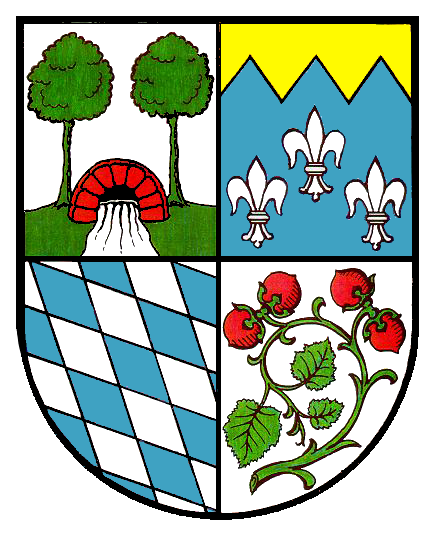
- Coat of arms

- Location of Dittelsheim-Heßloch within Alzey-Worms district
- Interactive map of Dittelsheim-Heßloch
- Location within Germany Location within Rhineland-Palatinate
- Coordinates: 49°44′38″N 8°14′13″E
- Country: Germany
- State: Rhineland-Palatinate
- District: Alzey-Worms
- Municipal assoc.: Wonnegau

Government
  - Mayor (2019–24): Elisabeth Kolb-Noack (Greens)

Area
  - Total: 13.84 km^{2} (5.34 sq mi)
- Elevation: 170 m (560 ft)

Population (2025-12-31)
  - Total: 2,102
  - Density: 151.9/km^{2} (393.4/sq mi)
- Time zone: UTC+01:00 (CET)
  - Summer (DST): UTC+02:00 (CEST)
- Postal codes: 67596
- Dialling codes: 06244
- Vehicle registration: AZ
- Website: dittelsheim-hessloch.de

Dittelsheim-Heßloch (or Dittelsheim-Hessloch) is an Ortsgemeinde – a municipality belonging to a Verbandsgemeinde, a kind of collective municipality – in the Alzey-Worms district in Rhineland-Palatinate, Germany.

== Geography ==
=== Location ===
The municipality lies in Rhenish Hesse, and is a wine village in the Wonnegau. It belongs to the Verbandsgemeinde of Wonnegau, whose seat is in Osthofen.

== History ==
Werner II of Bolanden was enfeoffed about 1190 with the village of Dittelsheim by the Counts of Katzenelnbogen. Bit by bit, the Electorate of the Palatinate acquired the parts formerly held by the Raugrafen noble family and the Old Bolanden line, and those held by the von Wachenheims and the von Dalbergs (15th to early 17th century). During the Middle Ages, the Lords of Dalberg held the Vogtei.

The municipality of Dittelsheim-Heßloch came into being on 7 June 1969 through the merger of the two municipalities of Dittelsheim and Heßloch.

== Politics ==
=== Municipal council ===
The council is made up of 16 council members, who were elected at the municipal election held on 7 June 2009, with the honorary mayor as chairman.

The municipal election held on 7 June 2009 yielded the following results:

	SPD	CDU	FWG	Total
2009	4	6	6	16 seats
2004	4	7	5	16 seats

=== Mayors ===
- Werner Spies - FWG (1970–1989)
- Herbert Morch - SPD (1989–2004)
- Rainer Fuhrmann - CDU (2004–2014)
- Elisabeth Kolb-Noack - Greens (2014–present)

== Culture and sightseeing ==
=== Buildings ===
- Sarazenenturm (Saracen Tower): A tower at the Evangelical church in the constituent community of Dittelsheim, built about 1200, known locally as the Heidenturm (“Heathen Tower”). The church itself was torn down in 1729 and replaced with a Baroque structure. Only the vestibule and the tower remain from earlier times. Reportedly, Moorish or Byzantine style influences can be made out in this Romanesque tower. It is often described as the loveliest of its kind in Rhenish Hesse. The spire with its 16-sided cupola top supposedly bears some relation to the Hohenstaufen Rhinelands to the east and it belongs to a group of similar spires in Rhenish Hesse, such as Alsheim, Guntersblum and Saint Paul’s Church in Worms. The names Heidenturm and Sarazenenturm go back to the Crusaders who supposedly built the tower.
- Old Catholic Christuskirche in Heßloch.

=== Sport ===
- TSG Dittelsheim (gymnastic and sport club)
- Kunstradfahrverein Dittelsheim (artistic cycling)
- TuS Hessloch (gymnastic and sport club)

=== Clubs ===
- Kloppberggugger e.V. – the first Guggenmusik from Rhenish Hesse
- Musikverein Hessloch (music club)

== Economy and infrastructure ==
=== Winegrowing ===
Winegrowing has a long tradition here. Dittelsheim-Heßloch covers an area of some 1 350 ha, of which 446 ha is planted with vineyards.

Differences in elevation, various microclimatic conditions and highly differentiated soil compositions that range from heavy, loamy to light sandy earth are good preconditions for winegrowing, and thus many different varieties of vine thrive in Dittelsheim-Heßloch, making possible a broad palette of wines.

=== Transport ===
Dittelsheim-Heßloch was once served by the former Osthofen–Gau Odernheim railway line.

== Famous people ==
- Jakob Becker (b. 15 March 1810 in Dittelsheim; d. 22 December 1872 in Frankfurt am Main) painter, etcher and lithographer as well as art professor at Städel
- Anton Praetorius was from 1592 to 1596 the first reformed clergyman in Dittelsheim. He wrote in 1595 the earliest description of the first Great Barrel at Heidelberg Castle, in which he praised the barrel as a symbol for the Calvinist belief’s supremacy. He was later known as an active opponent of witch trials and torture.
- Julia Metzler was the Rhenish-Hessian Wine Queen in 2006/2007 and German Wine Princess in 2007/2008.
