= University of Applied Sciences, Worms =

Coordinates: 49°38′0″N 8°20′40″E

University of Applied Sciences Worms
- Hochschule Worms
- Type: Public
- Established: 1978
- Chancellor: Kerstin Henzel
- President: Alexandra Nonnenmacher
- Vice-Chancellor: Hans Rück, Michael Graef
- Students: ca. 3.500
- Location: Worms, Rhineland-Palatinate, Germany
- Website: www.hs-worms.de

Worms University of Applied Sciences (German: Hochschule Worms) is a business and technology-oriented university of applied sciences in Worms, Germany. Around 3500 students are taught in 38 degree programmes by 74 professors and around 100 lecturers.

Worms University of Applied Sciences has three departments: Tourism/Travel Management, Computer Science and Business Sciences. The courses offered include both business and technical Bachelor's and Master's programmes. Some of these courses can also be studied in a dual system with practical training. Part-time MBA programmes are also offered. Numerous company cooperations make it possible to study with constant practical relevance and to establish valuable contacts for starting a career while still studying. Double degrees are also offered at Worms University of Applied Sciences.

A special feature of Worms University of Applied Sciences is its international orientation. There are currently cooperation agreements with over 180 universities in more than 50 countries around the world. At numerous partner universities, there is the possibility of obtaining a double Bachelor's or also a double Master's degree. Partner universities are in Europe, Asia, Australia, North America and South America.

== Research ==
The university's research is mostly applied, including a few internationally connected research groups. Mentionable past and current research projects and research-oriented projects with contributions from the University of Applied Sciences in Worms are the following:

- ALICE experiment
- SciPort RLP (the research database of the Rhineland-Palatinate)

== See also ==
- Fachhochschule
- List of colleges and universities
- Worms
