= Westhofen =

- Municipality
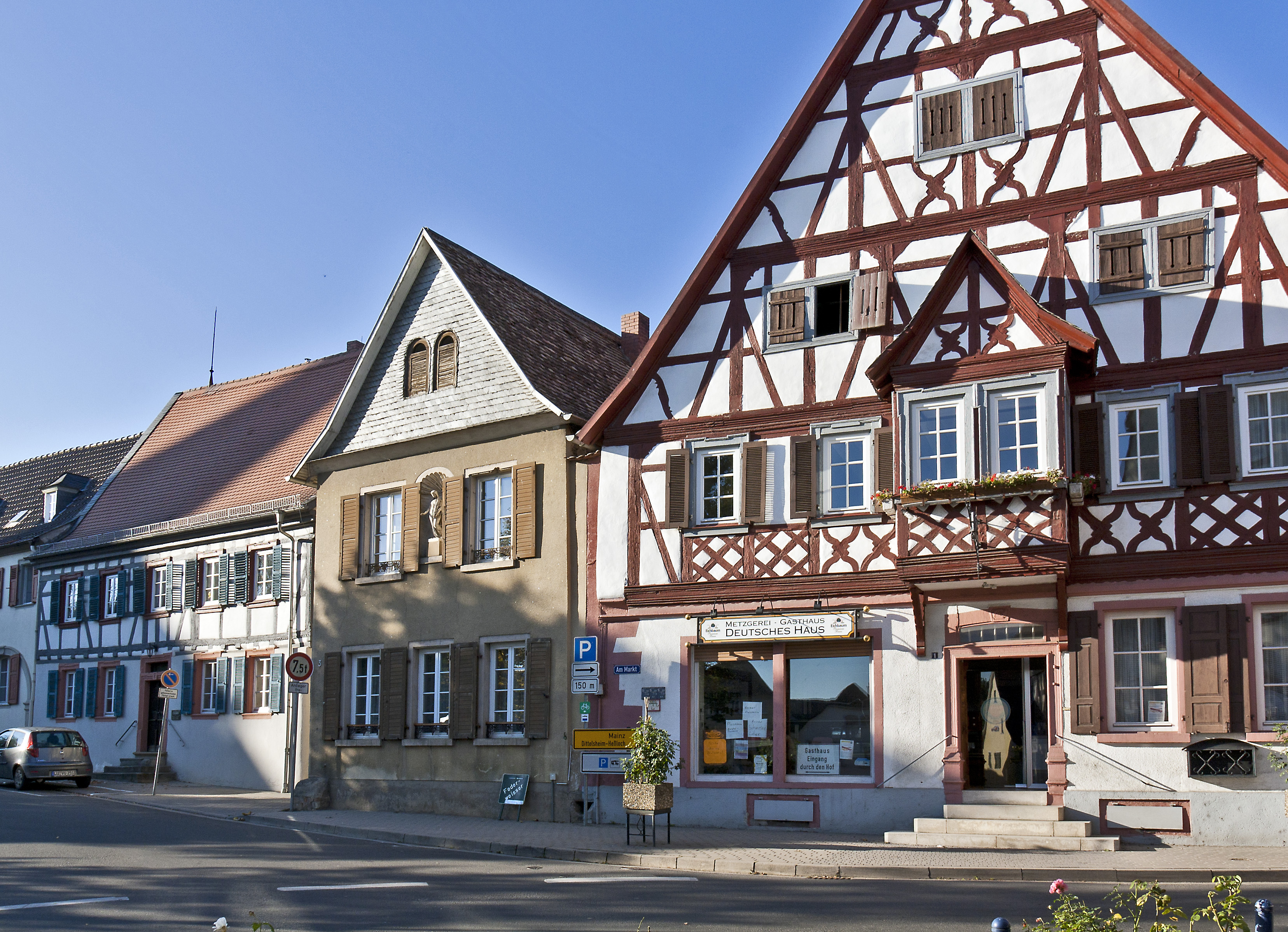
- Old houses on the town square

- Coat of arms

- Location of Westhofen within Alzey-Worms district
- Interactive map of Westhofen
- Location within Germany Location within Rhineland-Palatinate
- Coordinates: 49°42′16″N 8°14′53″E
- Country: Germany
- State: Rhineland-Palatinate
- District: Alzey-Worms
- Municipal assoc.: Wonnegau

Government
  - Mayor (2019–24): Ottfried Fehlinger (CDU)

Area
  - Total: 14.73 km^{2} (5.69 sq mi)
- Elevation: 121 m (397 ft)

Population (2025-12-31)
  - Total: 3,328
  - Density: 225.9/km^{2} (585.2/sq mi)
- Time zone: UTC+01:00 (CET)
  - Summer (DST): UTC+02:00 (CEST)
- Postal codes: 67593
- Dialling codes: 06244
- Vehicle registration: AZ
- Website: www.gemeinde-westhofen.de

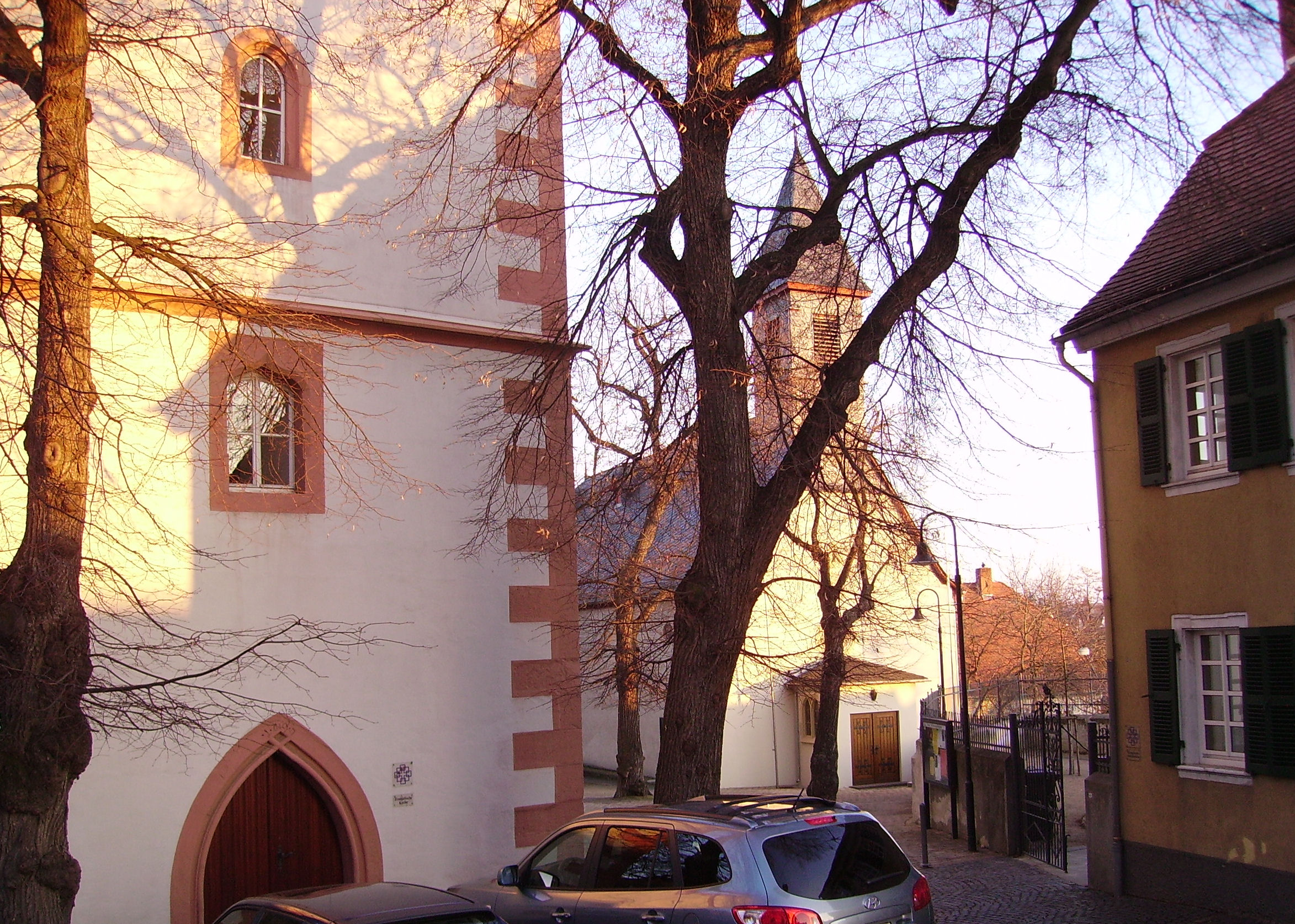
Evangelical and Catholic church

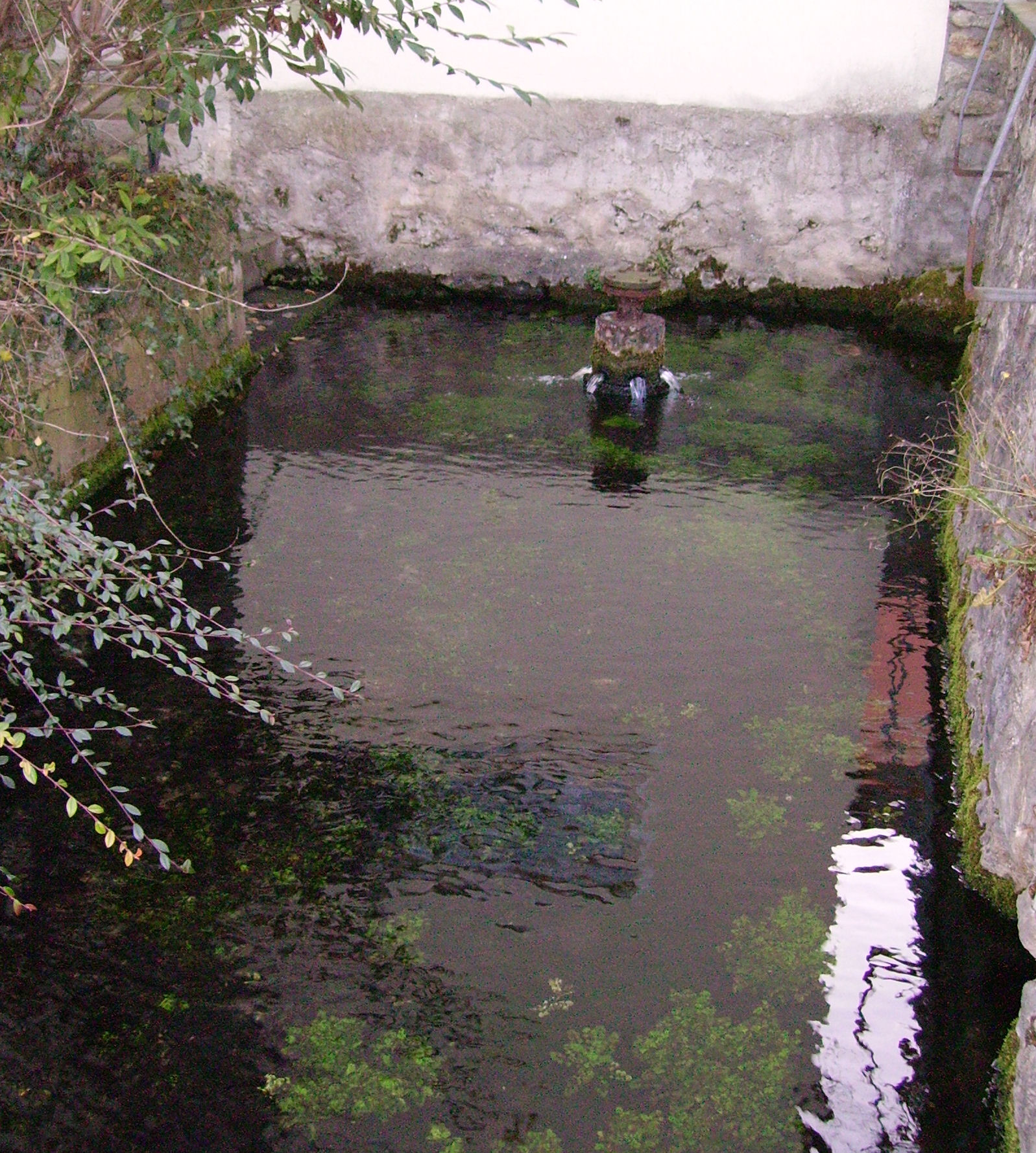
Source of the Seebach

Westhofen (German pronunciation: [vɛstˈhoːfn̩]) is an Ortsgemeinde – a municipality belonging to a Verbandsgemeinde, a kind of collective municipality – in the Alzey-Worms district in Rhineland-Palatinate, Germany.

== Geography ==
=== Location ===
Westhofen lies between Worms (roughly 12 km to the southeast), Mainz and Alzey in Rhenish Hesse and is part of the Verbandsgemeinde Wonnegau.

=== Hydrology ===
In Westhofen rises the Seebach, Rhenish Hesse's strongest spring. It is also the only spring in the region that rises in a valley. It is fed by groundwater from the Donnersberg area.

== History ==
Westhofen had its first documentary mention as far back as Carolingian times and was granted market rights in 1324. Westhofen's importance in earlier times can be seen in the ring of defences around the village, which are still preserved, and which include a wall and several dykes.

== Politics ==
=== Municipal council ===
The council is made up of 20 council members, who were elected at the municipal election held on 7 June 2009, and the honorary mayor as chairman.

The municipal election held on 26 May 2019 yielded the following results:

	SPD	CDU	FWG	Total
2019	6	9	5	20 seats
2014	5	9	6	20 seats

=== Coat of arms ===
The municipality's arms might be described thus: Argent six grapeleaves conjoined at the fess point in pale, bend and bend sinister, all vert, growing on which three bunches of grapes azure.

The motif displayed in the charges, of course, symbolizes Westhofen's most important industry, winegrowing. Similar compositions can be seen in municipal seals dating back to the 15th century, although a coat of arms appearing in the Kaffee HAG albums in the 1920s shows a somewhat different composition, although it is the same motif. That showed a full vine, not only leaves, and a small, fourth bunch with only three grapes.

Moreover, beginning in 1615, Westhofen was part of Electoral Palatinate and adopted the Palatine Lion as a charge in its arms. He held a bunch of grapes in his paw. That has not been retained in the modern arms.

The arms were granted in 1929.

== Economy and infrastructure ==
Westhofen is characterized heavily by winegrowing, and with 764 ha of planted vineyards, of which 68.7% grows red wine varieties and 31.3% white, it is Rhenish Hesse's fourth biggest winegrowing centre after Worms (1,490 ha), Nierstein (783 ha) and Alzey (769 ha). The most renowned winemaking appellations – Grosse Lagen (as classified by the Verband Deutscher Prädikatsweingüter VDP) – are the Aulerde, Kirchspiel, Brunnenhäuschen and Morstein.

== Culture and sightseeing ==
=== Buildings ===
On one of Rhenish Hesse's marketplaces are found rows of timber-frame houses and monuments, along with the Evangelical and Catholic church. Under the church, a charnel house was discovered on 3 October 1981.

=== Natural monuments ===
Westhofen is one of the places in Rhenish Hesse where mammalian remains from some ten million years ago have been found, in the prehistoric Rhine's Deinotherium Sands, whose name comes from this extinct proboscid's teeth and bone remnants, which are often yielded up by these deposits.

=== Regular events ===
Westhofen holds yearly festivals such as the Traubenblütenfest ("Grape Blossom Festival", usually on the second weekend after Whitsun), the Westhofener Markt (market; on the third Sunday in August) and the Dreikönigsdreschen (on the first Sunday after Epiphany).
