= Osthofen =

- Town
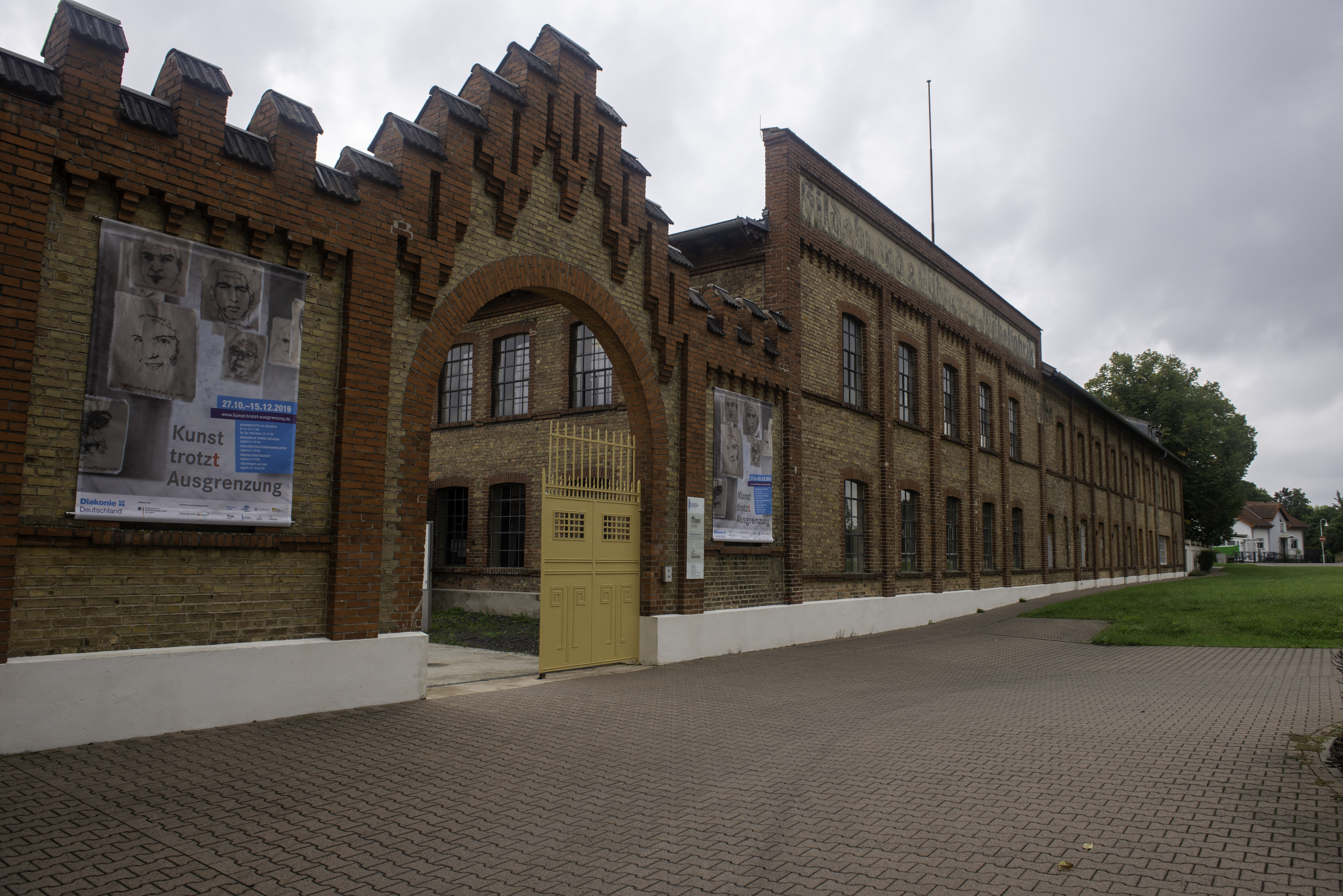
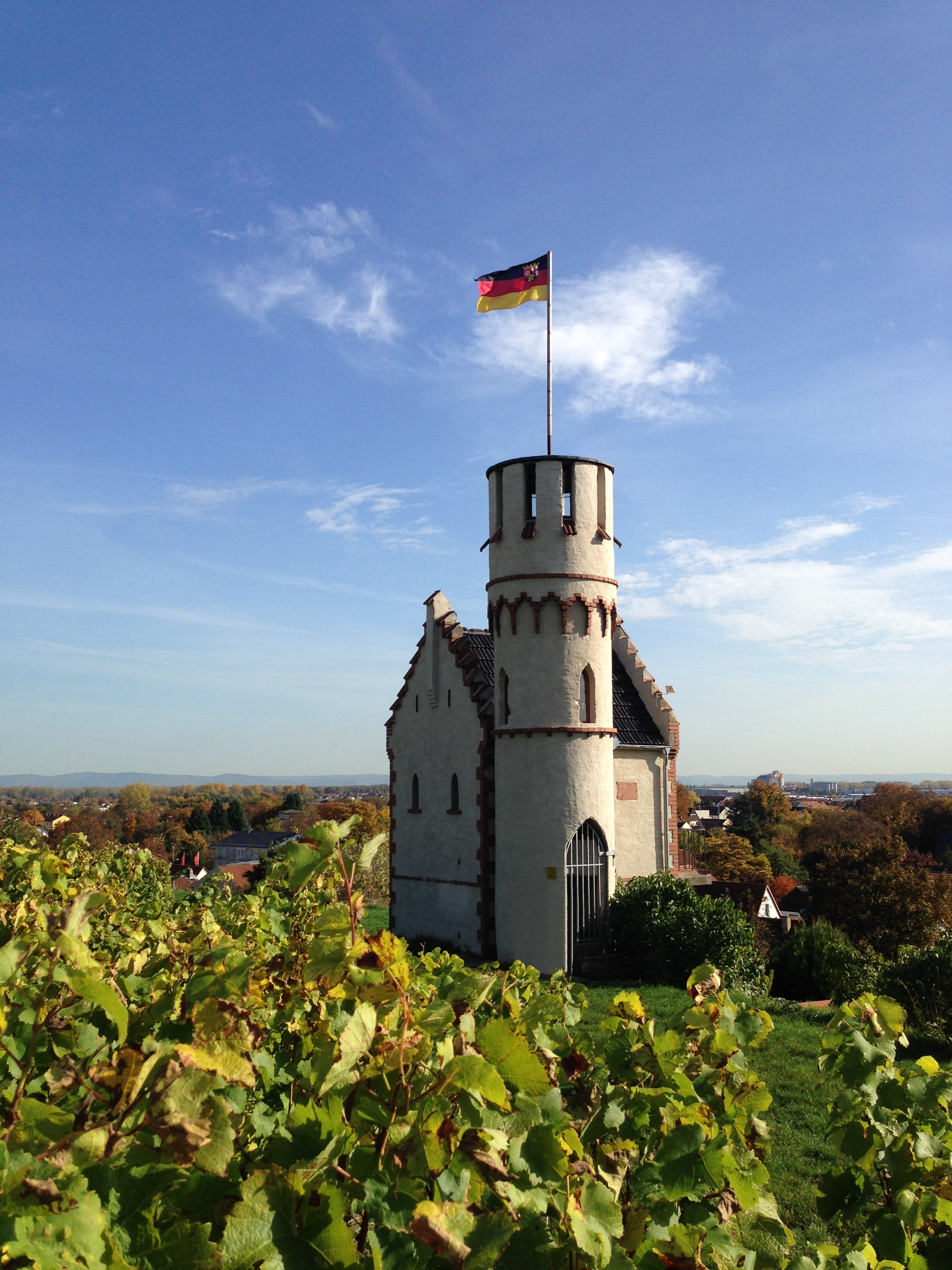
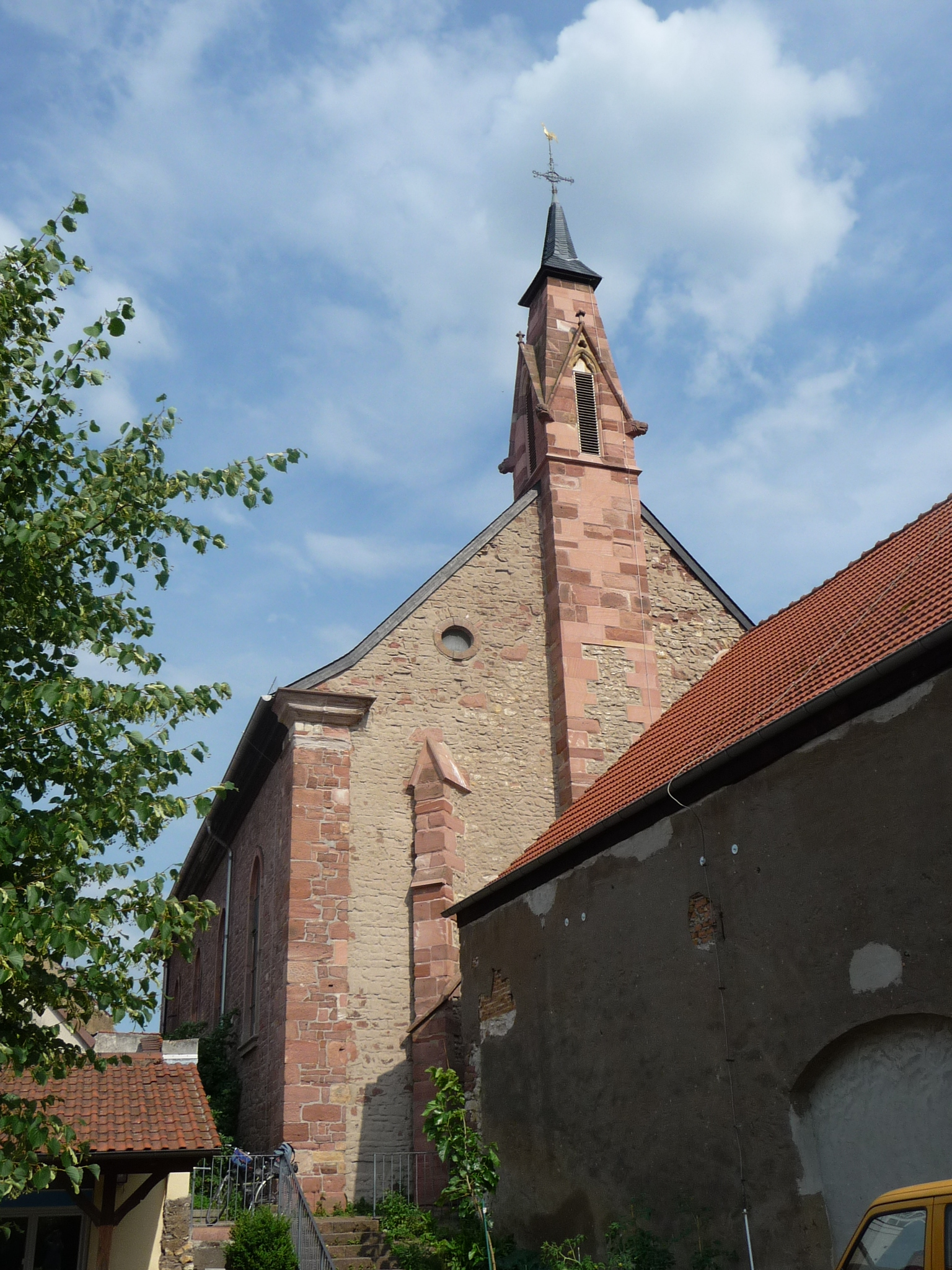
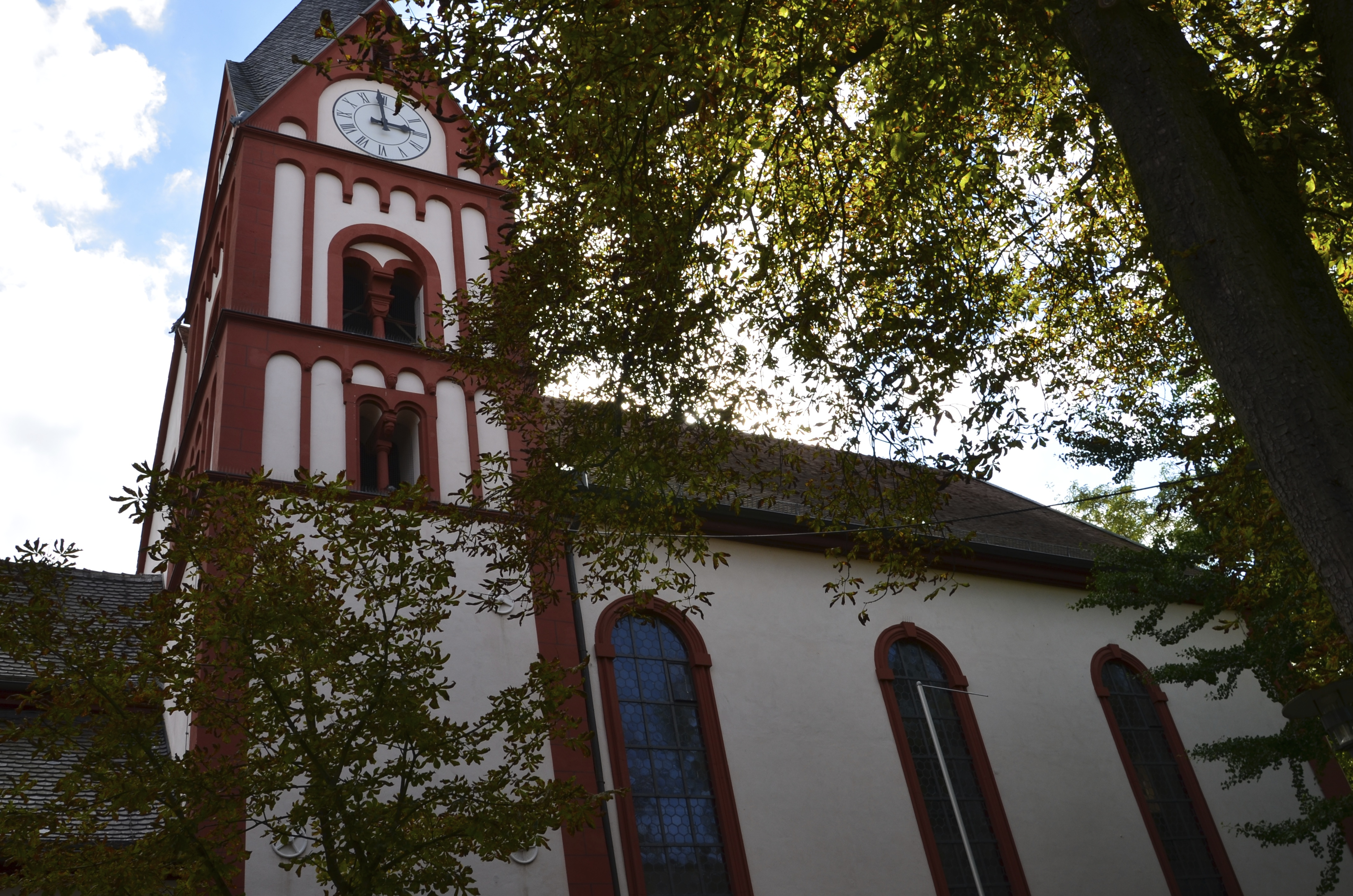
- concentration camp memorial Leckzapfen miniature castle Saint Remigius church Bergkirche ("mountain church")

- Coat of arms

- Location of Osthofen within Alzey-Worms district
- Interactive map of Osthofen
- Location within Germany Location within Rhineland-Palatinate
- Coordinates: 49°42′28″N 08°19′44″E
- Country: Germany
- State: Rhineland-Palatinate
- District: Alzey-Worms
- Municipal assoc.: Wonnegau

Government
  - Mayor (2019–24): Thomas Goller (SPD)

Area
  - Total: 18.63 km^{2} (7.19 sq mi)
- Elevation: 89 m (292 ft)

Population (2025-12-31)
  - Total: 9,653
  - Density: 518.1/km^{2} (1,342/sq mi)
- Time zone: UTC+01:00 (CET)
  - Summer (DST): UTC+02:00 (CEST)
- Postal codes: 67574
- Dialling codes: 06242
- Vehicle registration: AZ
- Website: www.osthofen.de

Osthofen (German: [ˈɔstˌhoːfn̩]) is a town in the middle of the Wonnegau in the Alzey-Worms district in Rhineland-Palatinate, Germany. Since 1 July 2014 it is part of the Verbandsgemeinde (a kind of collective municipality) Wonnegau. Osthofen was raised to town on 24 October 1970.

== Geography ==
=== Location ===
The town lies in Rhenish Hesse where the river Seebach, a very short river that rises in neighbouring Westhofen and flows for only 9 km, empties into the Rhine.

== History ==
Archaeological finds have established that the Osthofen municipal area was already settled at least four thousand years ago. The town had its first documentary mention in the Lorsch codex as Ostowa in a document dated to 784. It is believed that Osthofen was founded by people from either the now amalgamated village of Mühlheim or the Merovingian royal palace that once stood in Worms-Neuhausen.

On Osthofen's Goldberg (mountain), a chapel to Saint Remigius might have been built as early as the 6th century. This is where the first major estate was, which by 1195 had grown into an Imperial castle. In Mühlheim, the Knights Templar likewise built a castle in 12/15.

From 1933 to 1934, the city was home to a concentration camp which provides the subject for the novel The Seventh Cross by Anna Seghers.

== Politics ==
=== Town council ===
The council is made up of 24 honorary council members, who were elected at the municipal election held on 7 June 2009, and the mayor as chairman.

The municipal election held on 7 June 2009 yielded the following results:

Year	SPD	CDU	ödp	FWG	Total
2009	11	7	1	5	24 seats
2004	11	8	-	5	24 seats

=== Mayors ===
- Wendelin Best (1822–1831)
- Johann Weißheimer II. (1831–1843)
- Georg Friedrich Knierim I. (1843-1850)
- Peter Berger (1851-1853)
- Friedrich Knierim I. (1853-1862)
- Nikolaus Nagel (1862-1864)
- Georg Friedrich Best II. (1864-1867)
- Jakob Beckenbach (1867-1870)
- Johann Rißler III. (1870-1883)
- Simon Friedrich Schill (1883-1892)
- Johann Rißler III. (1892-1897)
- Georg Jakob Konrad (1897-1912)
- Wilhelm Schmitt (1912-1923)
- Carl Brenner (1924-1933)
- Dr. Wilhelm Fuhrländer (1933-1935)
- Dr. Kurt Mildner (1935-1944)
- Heinrich Hundsdorf (1944-1945) (provisional)
- Heinrich Rhein (1945-1946)
- Ludwig Knobloch (1946-1948)
- Walter Aßmann (1948-1956)
- Albert Fischer (1956-1972)
- Günter Metzler (1973–1987)
- Klaus Hagemann (1987–1994)
- Bernd Müller (1994–2012)
- Wolfgang Itzerodt (2013–2014)
- Thomas Goller (2014–present)

=== Coat of arms ===
The town's arms might be described thus: Sable a lion rampant Or armed, langued and crowned gules, issuant from dexter chief the sun and in an arc from dexter to middle base three mullets, all of the second.

The town's earliest seals come from the 14th century, but they show a crane under a cross, a composition of unknown meaning. The current arms are first found on seals from the 16th century, and the composition has not changed since. The arms were officially granted the town in 1651, and once again in 1959. The sun and stars (or heraldically, mullets) are canting charges, as they are meant to suggest the direction “east”, which is the first part of the town's name, the German word being Ost(en). The lion is the Palatine Lion, recalling the town's long history under Electoral Palatinate’s rule.

== Culture and sightseeing ==
=== Buildings ===
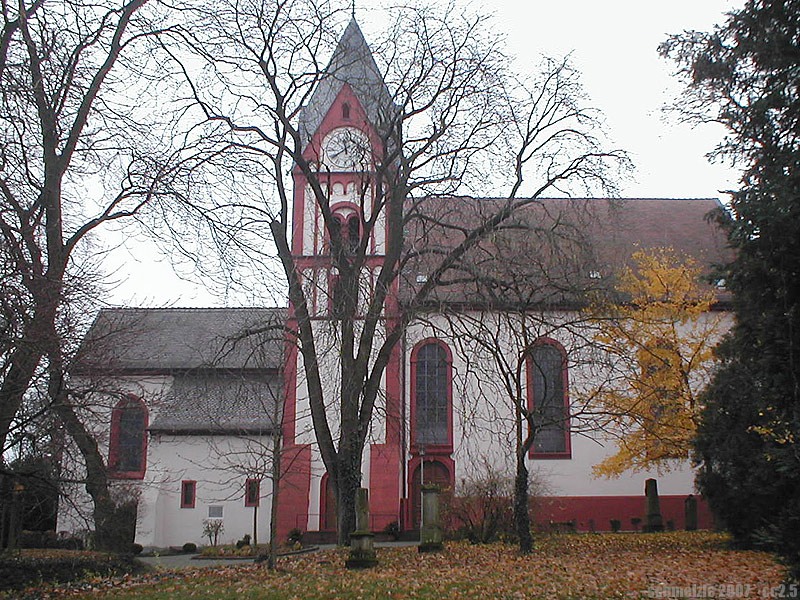
Bergkirche

- The Evangelical Bergkirche (“Mountain Church”) is believed to have stemmed from a chapel to Saint Remigius built in the 6th century beside which grew into an estate fortified with a castle over the course of the ages. Today's church grew out of the castle and the chapel, with the churchtower, it is further believed, standing on the old keep’s foundations. The castle was converted many times, acquiring its current shape after a fire in the 19th century.
- Saint John’s Catholic Church (Johanniskirche) had its beginnings in a temple of the Order of Saint John, and in 1713 it was transferred to the Catholic parish (the Order is Protestant), which radically converted the building in 1792. The church’s altar was originally to be found in the Carmelite church in Worms.
- The Town Hall (Rathaus) was built in 1902 as a financial office.
- The Old Town Hall (Altes Rathaus) was built in 1739 as the town’s second town hall.
- Into the so-called “Little Church” (Kleine Kirche), which directly neighbours the Old Town Hall, parts of the first town hall from 1581 have been incorporated.
- The Waterworks (Wasserwerk) from 1906 has a striking façade with Art Nouveau and Baroque Revival elements.
- The Jewish graveyard on Mettenheimer Chaussee was laid out in 1832 and is a memorial to the town's Jewish community.
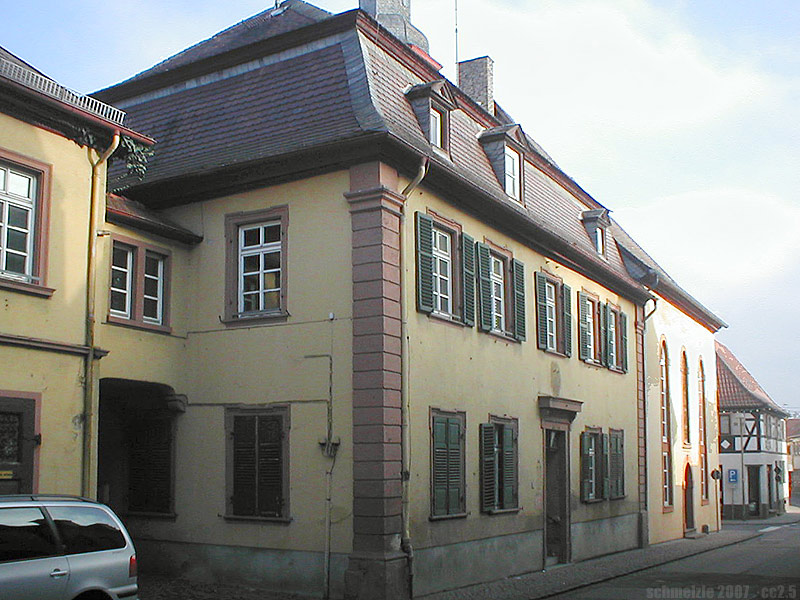
Old Town Hall

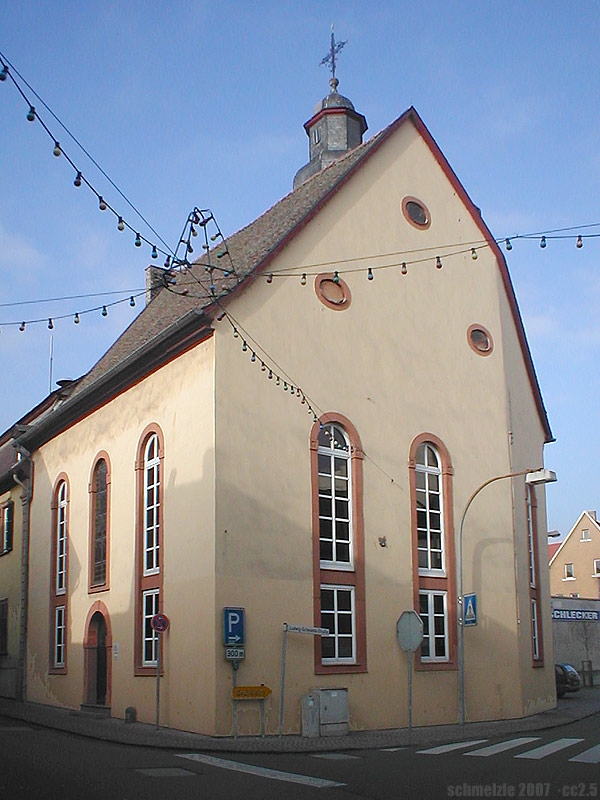
Kleine Kirche

=== Regular events ===
From 1949 to 2013, the Wonnegauer Winzerfest (“Wonnegau Winemakers’ Festival”) was held yearly in Osthofen. Among this days-long event's highlights were a great parade, the crowning of the Wonnegau Wine Queen and the traditional Monday wine tasting.

== Economy and infrastructure ==
Osthofen is a state-recognized tourism centre, and under state planning also identified as a lower centre.

=== Transport ===
Osthofen has at its disposal a railway station with a connection to the Mainz–Ludwigshafen line. Formerly there were connections to the Osthofen–Rheindürkheim–Guntersblum line (on which there is still goods traffic as far as Worms-Rheindürkheim), the Osthofen–Westhofen line (locally known as the Gickelche) and the Osthofen–Gau-Odernheim line. The last two have since been torn up.

Nearby is also an Autobahn interchange onto the A 61, and towards the Rhine lies Bundesstraße 9.

=== Winegrowing ===
Osthofen belongs to the Wonnegau winegrowing zone in Rhenish Hesse. Within the town, 35 winegrowing businesses are active, and the planted vineyard area amounts to 465 ha. Some 68% of the wine made here is from white wine varieties (as at 2007). In 1979, there were still 116 such active businesses, but the planted vineyard area amounted to only 429 ha.

=== Established businesses ===
Osthofen is headquarters of the malting firm GlobalMalt.

=== Public institutions ===
The town is the location of the former Osthofen concentration camp, and a memorial site is found there today.

== Famous people ==
=== Sons and daughters of the town ===
- Johann Georg Lehmann (b. 1744, d. 1817 in Frankenthal)
- Johann Weißheimer II. (b. 1797, d. 1883 in Osthofen)
- Chief building director Friedrich August von Pauli (b. 1802, d. 1883 in Bad Kissingen)
- Wendelin Weißheimer (b. 26 February 1838, d. 10 June 1910 in Nuremberg)
- Dr. Georg Wander - Creator of Ovaltine (b. 1841, d. 1897 in Bern, Switzerland)
- Dietrich Grün - Watch pioneer and founder of the “Gruen Watch Company” (b. 1847, d. 1910)
- Prelate Adam Schreiber (b. 1849, d. 1929 in Worms)
- Karl Heinrich Berger (b. 1861, d. 1933 in Kandern, Baden)
- Conductor Friedrich Best (b. 1876, d. 1936 in Heidenau, Saxony)
- Heinrich Beckenbach (b. 5 February 1880, d. 31 March 1964)
- Christian Filips (b. 22 November 1981)

=== Famous people associated with the town ===
- Johannes Grun (b. 1646 in Alzey, d. 1718 in Osthofen)
- Church adviser Philip Gerhard Pauli (b. 1750 in Alzey, d. 1816 in Osthofen)
- Professor Friedrich Magnus Schwerd (b. 1792 in Alzey, d. 1871 in Speyer)
- Professor Dr. Peter Muth (b. 1860 at the Neumühle above Mühlheim, d. 1909 in Osthofen)
- Klaus Hagemann former mayor and since 1994 SPD Member of the Bundestag

== See also ==
- List of Nazi-German concentration camps
