= Rhenish Hesse =

Region in Germany

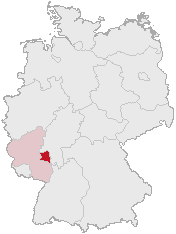
Rhenish Hesse (dark red), shown within Rhineland-Palatinate (pale red)

Rhenish Hesse or Rhine Hesse (German: Rheinhessen, pronounced [ʁaɪnˈhɛsn̩]) is a region and a former government district (Regierungsbezirk) in the German state of Rhineland-Palatinate. It is made up of territories west of the Upper Rhine river that were part of the Grand Duchy of Hesse and its successor in the Weimar Republic, the People's State of Hesse from 1916 to 1945. The hilly countryside is largely devoted to vineyards, comprising the Rheinhessen wine region.

== Geography ==
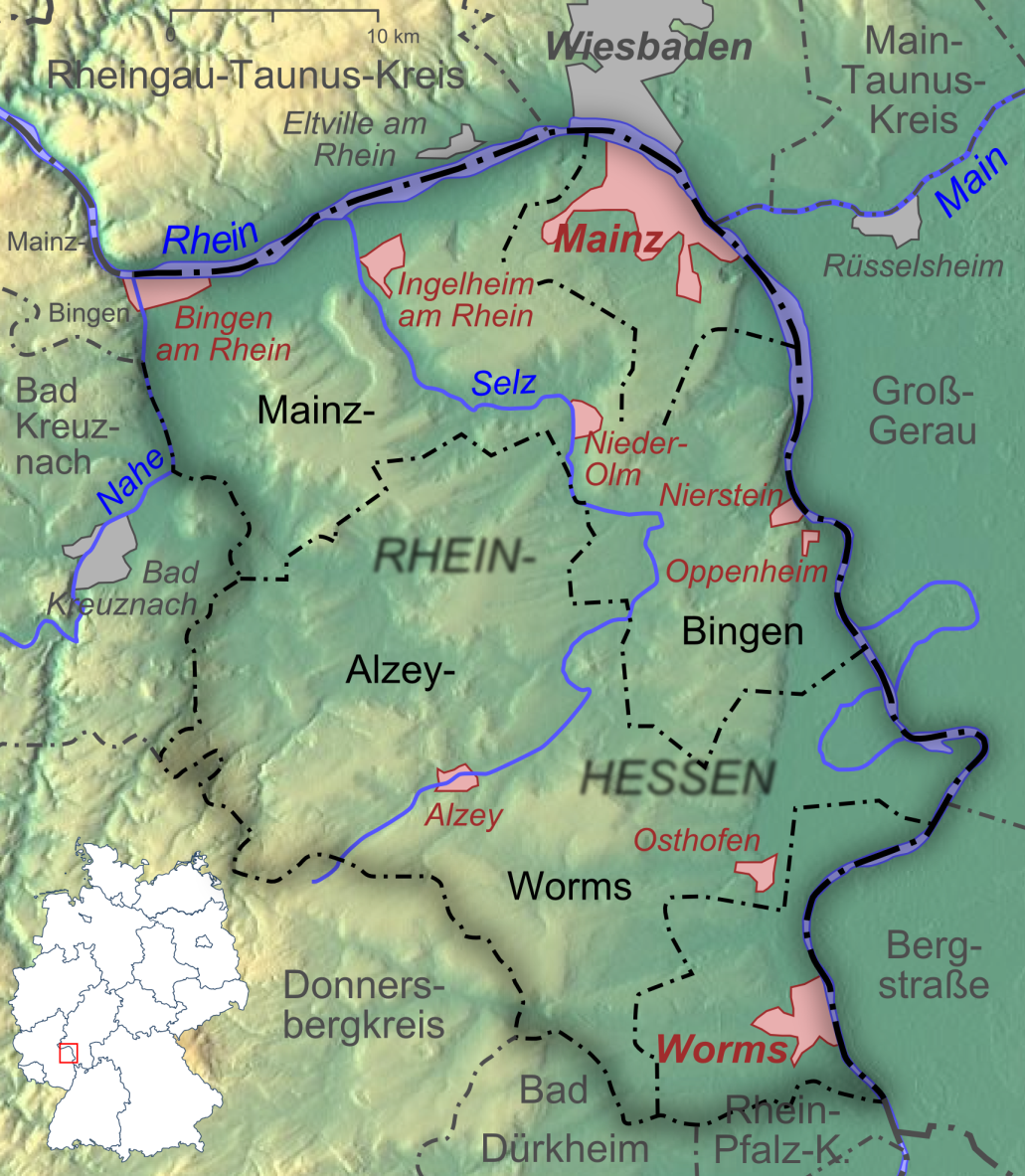
Topography and administrative divisions

Rhine Hesse stretches from the Upper Rhine Plain on the west bank of the Rhine up to the Nahe and Alsenz rivers in the west and down to the mouth of the Isenach in the south. The region borders on the Rhineland in the northwest, on the Palatinate in the southwest, and on South Hesse beyond the Rhine. The Rhenish-Hessian Hills along the Selz river, also called the "land of the thousand hills", reach up to 358 m (1,175 ft) at the summit of the Kappelberg and about 330 m (1,080 ft) in Rhenish-Hessian Switzerland.

The Mainz Basin, a Cenozoic marine basin, covered the area about 38 to 12 million years ago. The landscape is characterised by large Loess and Marl deposits. Due to the favourable climatic conditions of Rhenish Hesse, agriculture covers most of the region. As the Hunsrück and Taunus ranges protect it from cold winds, wine and fruit production is practised on a large scale.

The region comprises the cities of Mainz – the Rhineland-Palatinate capital – and Worms, surrounded by the administrative districts of Mainz-Bingen and Alzey-Worms. Other towns include Bingen, Alzey, Nieder-Olm, Ingelheim, Nierstein, Oppenheim, and Osthofen. Many inhabitants commute to work in Mainz or Wiesbaden and Frankfurt in the neighbouring state of Hesse.

== History ==
The importance of the Rhine Hessian lands increased when they were allotted to King Louis the German by the 843 Treaty of Verdun. The region was part of the core territory of Rhenish Franconia. It comprised the Imperial Cathedrals of Worms and Mainz which were erected in the High Middle Ages. The Worms Synagogue and the Jewish Cemetery count among the oldest in Europe. Devastated by the Thirty Years' War, the area became a patchwork of possessions of the Catholic Electorate of Mainz and the Prince-Bishopric of Worms as well as of the Protestant Electoral Palatinate.

Rhine Hesse was occupied by the First French Republic in 1792, during the War of the First Coalition. At the Congress of Vienna in 1814–15, Grand Duke Louis I of Hesse was obliged to give up his Westphalian territories. In compensation, he received the district on the left bank of the Rhine. Because of this addition, he amended his title to Grand Duke of Hesse and by Rhine and the name of the region was created. In Allied-occupied Germany, the Rhine Hessian lands were incorporated as a district into the newly established state of Rhineland-Palatinate in 1946.

== Cuisine ==
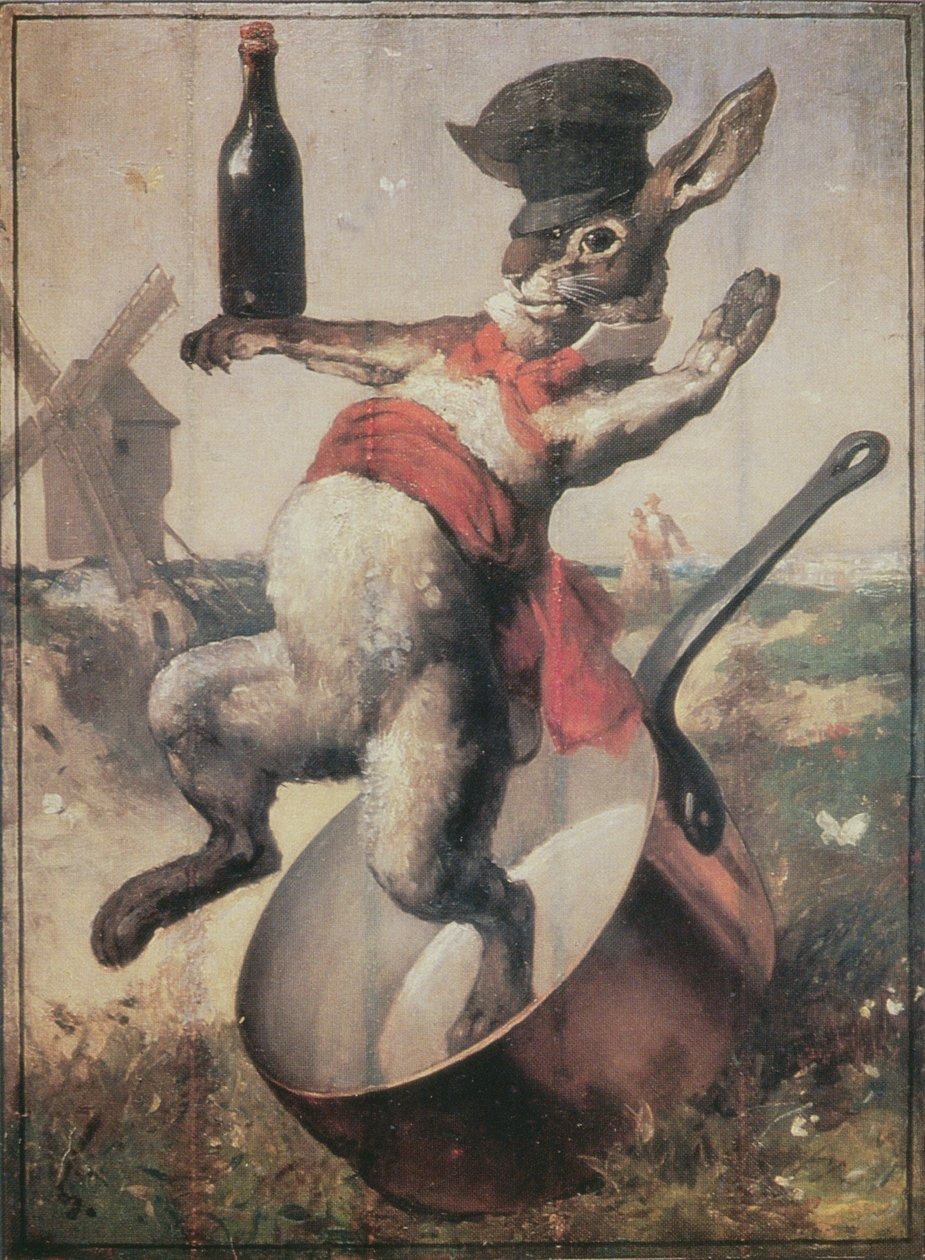
Dibbehas, caricature by André Gill

Each region has developed its own cuisine dependent on geography, climate, soils, seasons and wealth. These vary from plain home cooking with simple dishes to culinary specialties for festive occasions. Rhine Hesse also has a large number of specialties, with Weck, Worscht un Woi having achieved supra-regional fame, not least through the Mainz carnival.

- Backesbroode – a roast filled with potatoes and bacon
- Backesgrumbeere – spiced potato casserole with bacon, wine and sour cream
- Bremser or Bitzler – Federweißer
- Dibbehas – hare stew (Dibbe), with hare (wild hare, rabbit), spices and optionally with wine
- Asparagus (Gemüsespargel)
- Hackesweck – bread roll with highly spiced Mett (minced pork) and onions
- Handkäs with music – marinaded cheese, a Mainzer Roller marinaded in vinegar, oil and onions (music because of the subsequent flatulence)
- Kräppel, fried dough for Carnival
- Schales
- Spundekäs – consists of fresh cheese, paprika, onions and other spices
- Weck, Worscht un Woi, well known Rhine Hessian snack
- Weingelee (wine jelly)
- Weinsuppe (wine soup)
- Wingertsimbs – typical vineyard snack
- Wingertsknorze – rye bread roll with bacon and onions
- Woihinkelsche, originally from the Alsace (coq au vin à l’alsacienne), but must include chicken and white wine; not to be confused with the Weinhähnchen, an insect
- Zwiwwelkuche – Zwiebelkuchen

== Wine growing ==
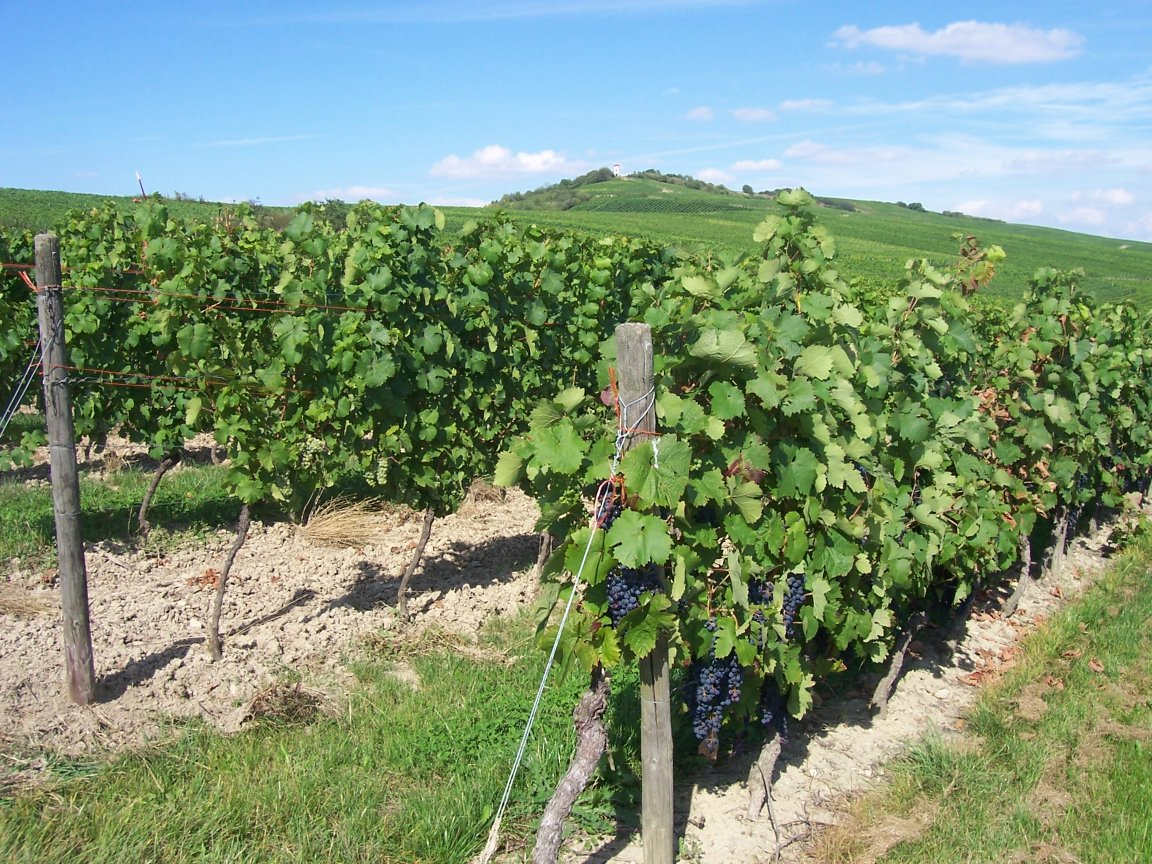
Rhine Hesse vineyards

Rhine Hesse is the largest of 13 regions producing German wine. Outside Germany, it is best known as the home of Liebfraumilch. Most is made from white varieties such as Riesling, Silvaner, Müller-Thurgau, Kerner, and Scheurebe. The best-known white wine area is the Rhine Terrace near Oppenheim and Nierstein. Some red varieties are grown, particularly around Ingelheim and Gundersheim, including Pinot noir, Blauer Portugieser, Dornfelder, and the recently established Regent.
