= Sulzheim, Rhineland-Palatinate =

Sulzheim
- Municipality
- Coat of arms

- Location of Sulzheim within Alzey-Worms district
- Interactive map of Sulzheim
- Location within Germany Location within Rhineland-Palatinate
- Coordinates: 49°50′38″N 8°5′36″E
- Country: Germany
- State: Rhineland-Palatinate
- District: Alzey-Worms
- Municipal assoc.: Wörrstadt

Government
  - Mayor (2019–24): Ulf Baasch

Area
  - Total: 6.07 km^{2} (2.34 sq mi)
- Elevation: 149 m (489 ft)

Population (2025-12-31)
  - Total: 1,276
  - Density: 210/km^{2} (544/sq mi)
- Time zone: UTC+01:00 (CET)
  - Summer (DST): UTC+02:00 (CEST)
- Postal codes: 55286
- Dialling codes: 06732
- Vehicle registration: AZ
- Website: www.sulzheim-rhh.de

Sulzheim (German pronunciation: [ˈzʊltshaɪm]) is an Ortsgemeinde – a municipality belonging to a Verbandsgemeinde, a kind of collective municipality – in the Alzey-Worms district in Rhineland-Palatinate, Germany.

== Geography ==
=== Location ===
As a winegrowing centre, Sulzheim lies in Germany's biggest winegrowing district, in the middle of the wine region of Rhenish Hesse. It belongs to the Verbandsgemeinde of Wörrstadt, whose seat is in the like-named municipality.

The municipality's highest elevation is the Schildberg at 209 m above sea level. The Sulzheimer Bach rises north of the municipality.

=== Neighbouring municipalities ===
Sulzheim's neighbours are Armsheim, Ensheim, Gau-Bickelheim, Gau-Weinheim, Spiesheim, Vendersheim, Wallertheim and Wörrstadt.

== History ==
In 766, Sulzheim had its first documentary mention.

== Politics ==
=== Municipal council ===
The council is made up of 16 council members, who were elected by majority vote at the municipal election held on 7 June 2009, and the honorary mayor as chairwoman.

=== Town partnerships ===
Partner municipality Sainte-Suzanne's coat of arms

- Sainte-Suzanne, Mayenne, France since 1967

Sainte-Suzanne is the seat of the like-named canton, and it is with this administrative unit that Sulzheim is partnered, thanks to the initiative of Adam Becker from Sulzheim and Victor Julien, conseiller général, maire de Thorigné-en-Charnie, both honorary citizens of Sulzheim. A square in Sulzheim bears Victor Julien's name; a street in Blandouet bears Adam Becker's. Sainte-Suzanne has a square de Sulzheim, and Vaiges a rue de Sulzheim. In Sulzheim is a street named Ste.-Suzanner-Straße.

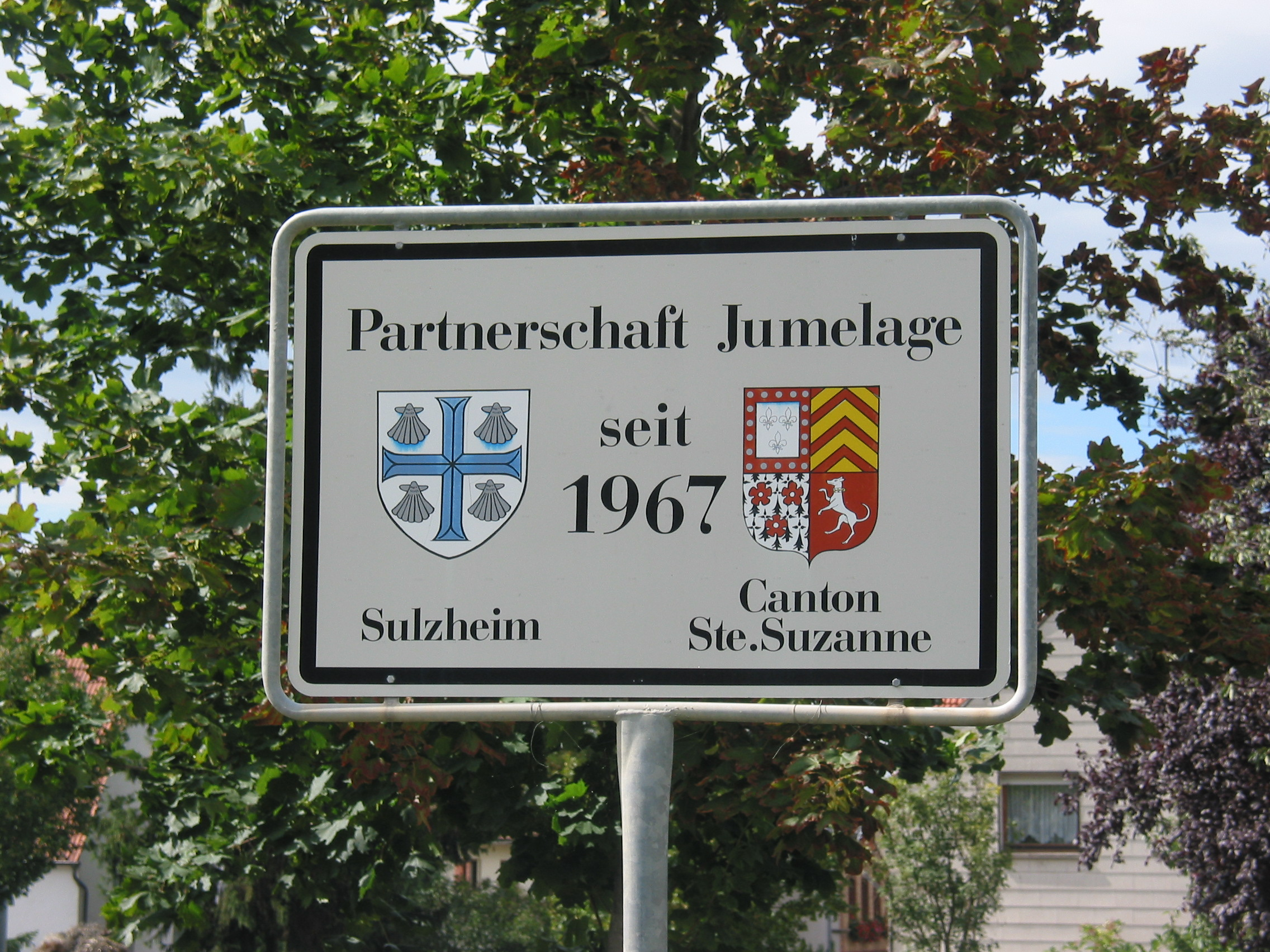
Notice about the partnership since 1967

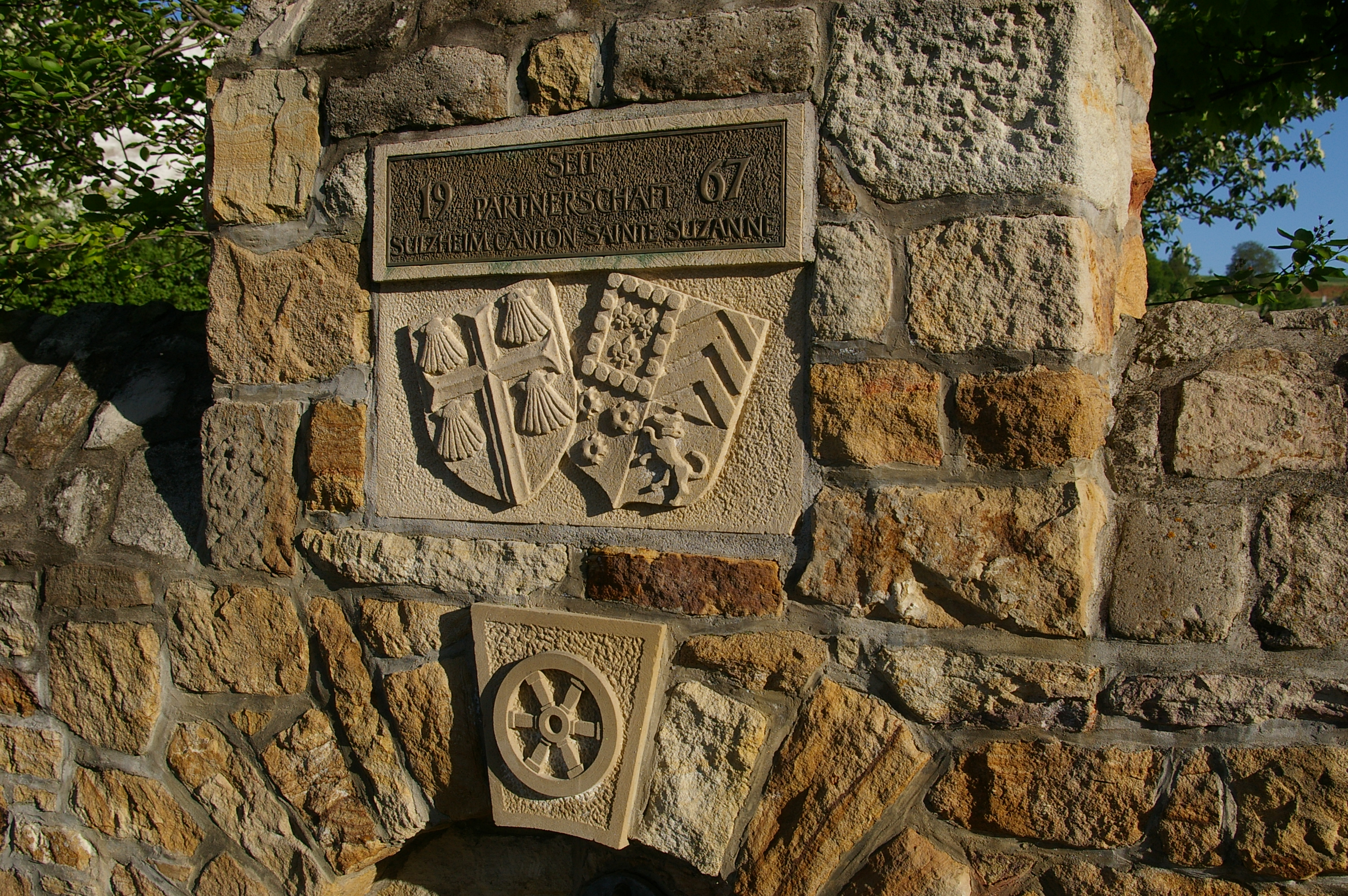
Stèle Place Victor-Julien à Sulzheim

=== Coat of arms ===
The municipality's arms might be described thus: Azure issuant from base a cross pattée Or between four escallops argent.

== Culture and sightseeing ==
=== Buildings ===
Worth seeing is the Baroque Catholic Church of Philippus und Jakobus, built in 1715.

=== Regular events ===
The yearly kermis (church consecration festival, locally known as the Kerb) is always held on the first weekend in May.

== Famous people ==
On 29 September 2007, 23-year-old Stefanie Ohl was chosen at the Electoral Palace in Mainz as Rhenish-Hessian Wine Queen for the 2007–2008 season.

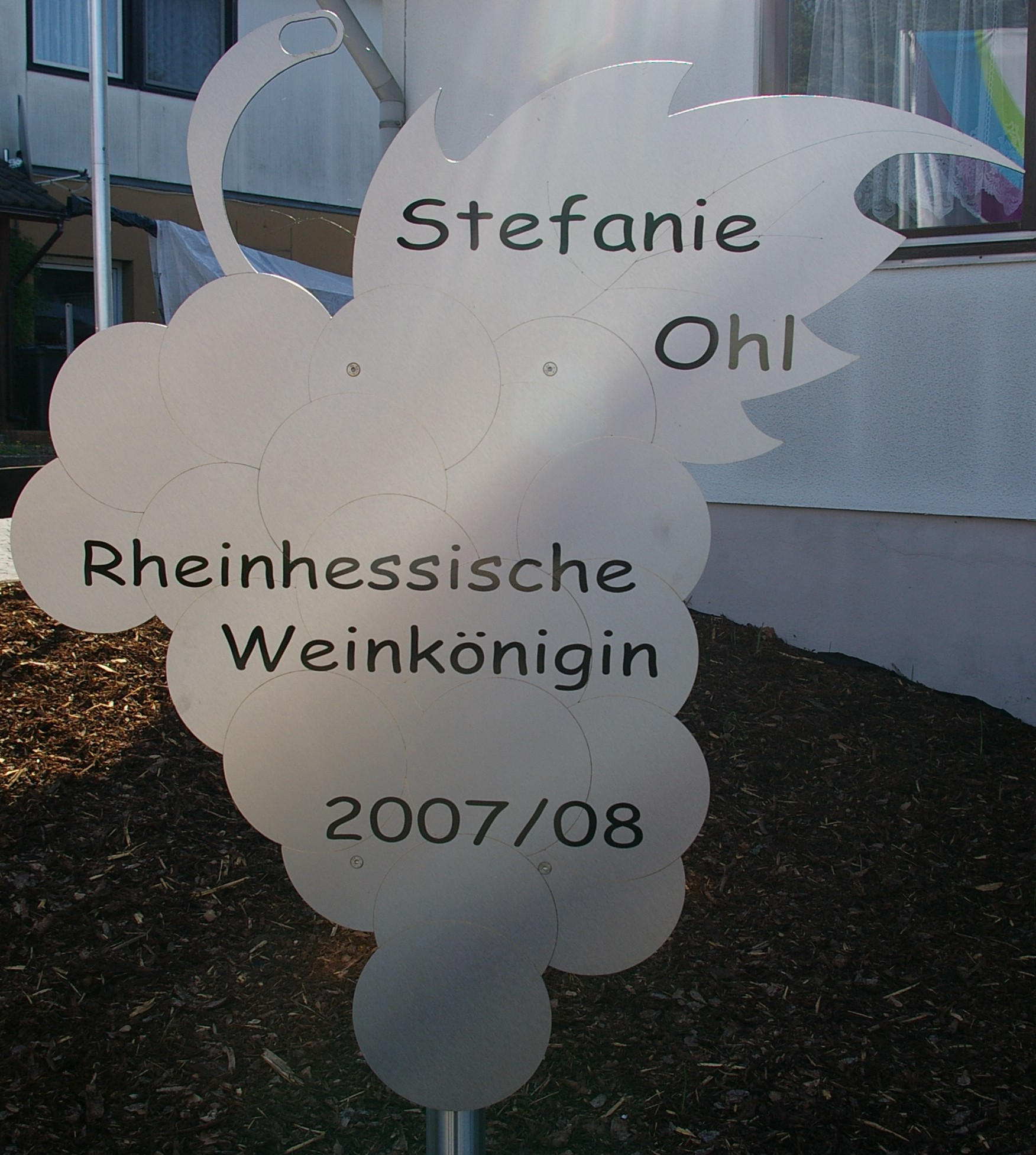
Notice at the way into the village about the 2007-2008 Rhenish-Hessian Wine Queen, Stefanie Ohl

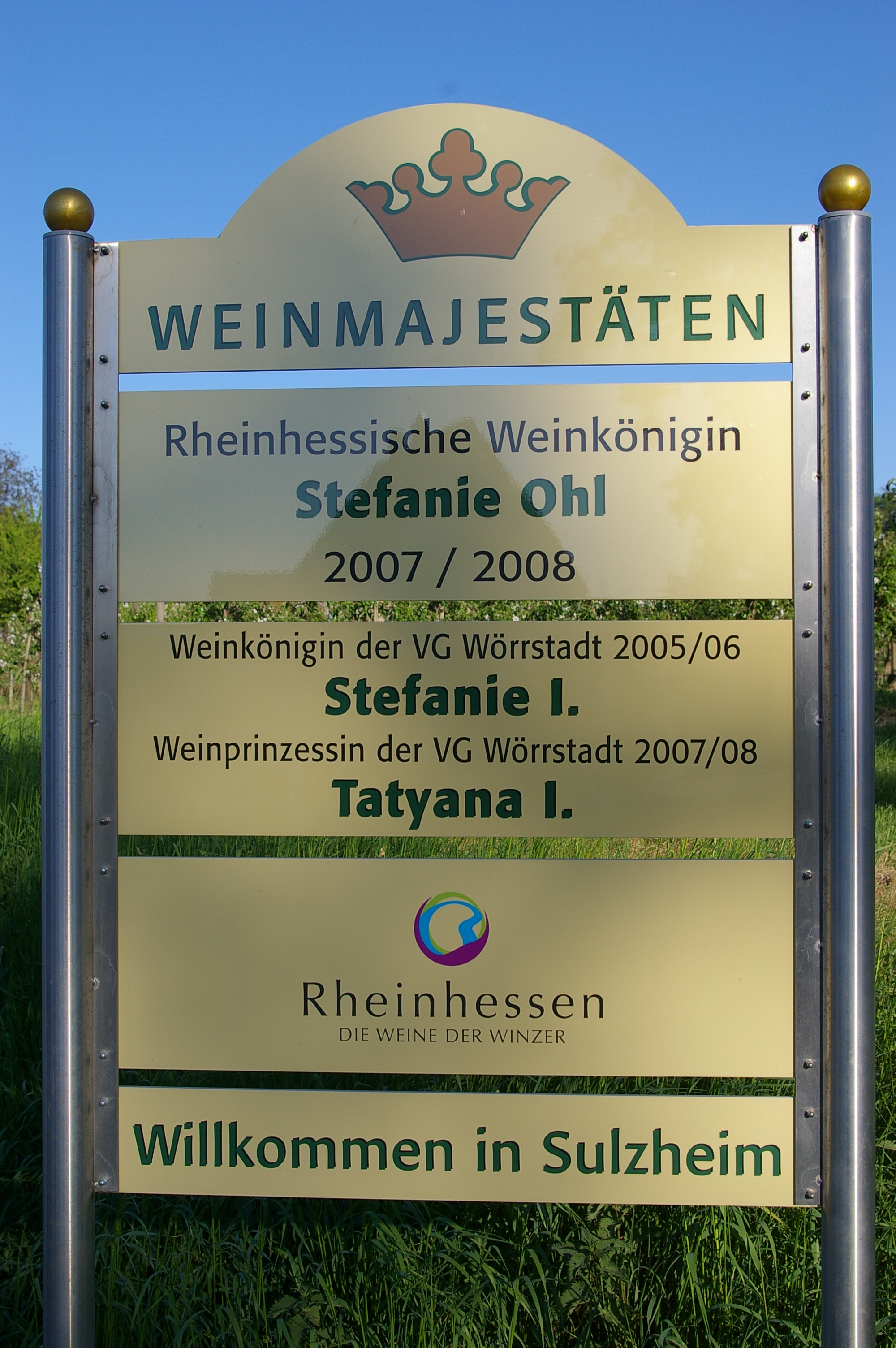
Notice at the way into the village about the 2007-2008 Rhenish-Hessian Wine Queen, Stefanie Ohl
