= Schornsheim =

- Municipality
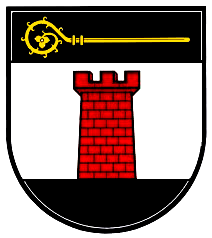
- Coat of arms

- Location of Schornsheim within Alzey-Worms district
- Interactive map of Schornsheim
- Location within Germany Location within Rhineland-Palatinate
- Coordinates: 49°50′45″N 8°10′30″E
- Country: Germany
- State: Rhineland-Palatinate
- District: Alzey-Worms
- Municipal assoc.: Wörrstadt

Government
  - Mayor (2019–24): Heiko Schmittbetz

Area
  - Total: 8.91 km^{2} (3.44 sq mi)
- Elevation: 160 m (520 ft)

Population (2025-12-31)
  - Total: 1,594
  - Density: 179/km^{2} (463/sq mi)
- Time zone: UTC+01:00 (CET)
  - Summer (DST): UTC+02:00 (CEST)
- Postal codes: 55288
- Dialling codes: 06732
- Vehicle registration: AZ
- Website: www.schornsheim.de

Schornsheim (German pronunciation: [ˈʃɔʁnshaɪm]) is an Ortsgemeinde – a municipality belonging to a Verbandsgemeinde, a kind of collective municipality – in the Alzey-Worms district in Rhineland-Palatinate, Germany.

== Geography ==
=== Location ===
The winegrowing centre lies in Rhenish Hesse and belongs to the Verbandsgemeinde of Wörrstadt, whose seat is in the like-named municipality.

=== Neighbouring municipalities ===
Schornsheim's neighbours are Gabsheim, Udenheim, Undenheim and Wörrstadt.

== History ==
=== Name’s origins ===
The name Schornsheim (in 782 Scoronishaim, in 815 Scornesheim, about 836 Scoranesheim, about 1230 Schornesheym, about 1520 Schornsheim) is formed with the placename ending —heim (cognate with English home), as are most Rhenish-Hessian placenames. The other root in the name, however, is something of a peculiarity. It is not a traditional Germanic personal name, nor a word for a natural feature, but rather a title, and only became a personal name through transference. Scoran (cognate with English shorn, and with much the same meaning, referring to a tonsure) was a word used for priests and monks and was given boys as a name who were destined for the clergy, for whom the tonsure had long stood as a defining mark. It could well be that a clergyman of this time gave Schornsheim its name. It is assumed that one or more Frankish settlements had already arisen in the area of what later became Schornsheim, and the unknown priest or monk only later gave the village his name, after he himself had settled there and founded a church and perhaps also a monastery.

In one of Charlemagne’s documents from 28 July 782, the king named Schornsheim’s church and estate as his property. The “estate” at that time meant the whole of the kingly holdings or a part thereof. How the ruler acquired it is unknown. Whatever it was that happened, it is known that the successor to the estate was the Scoran who had once founded the church.

=== Saint Leoba ===
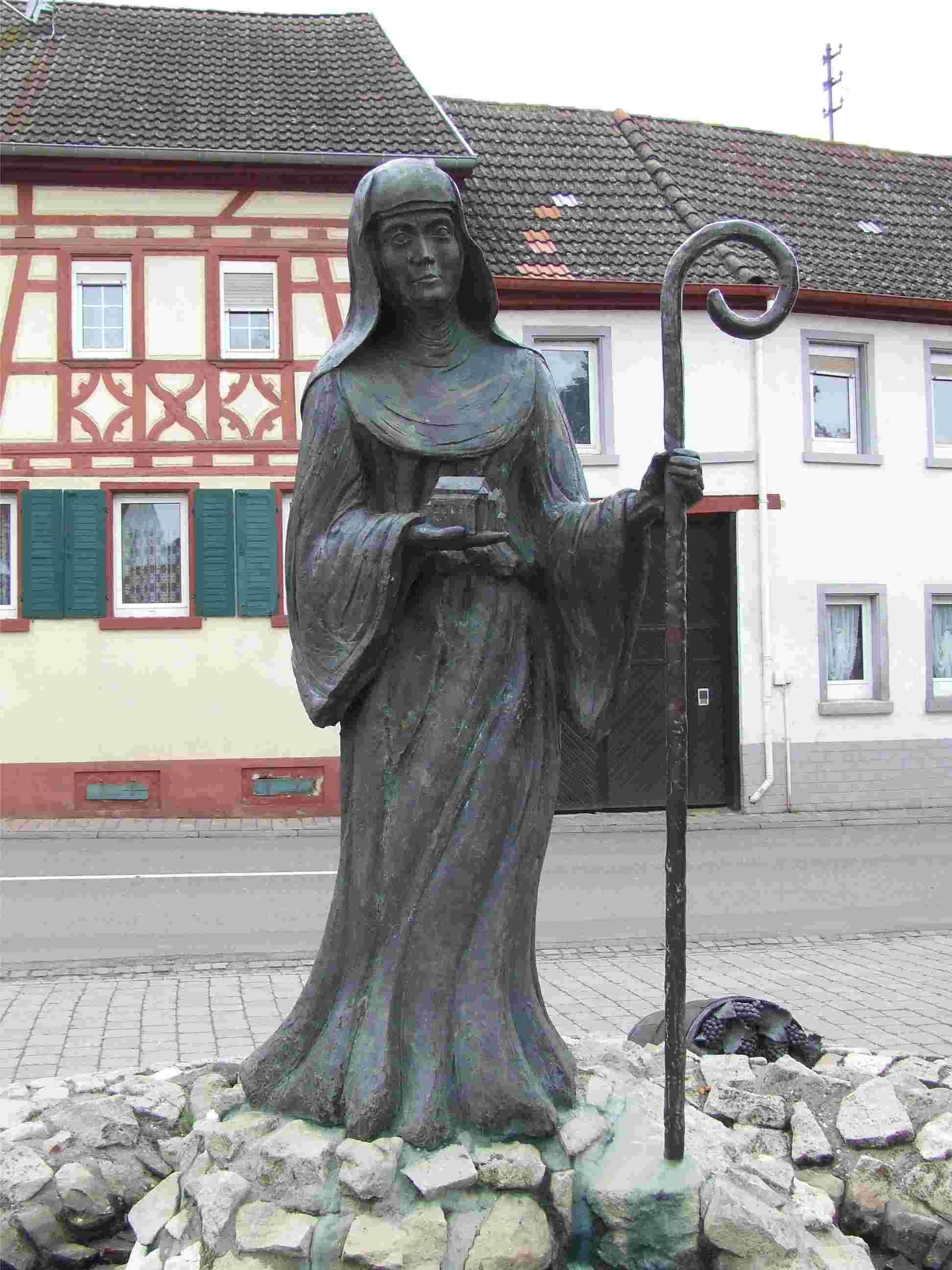
Fountain memorial for Saint Leoba

Charlemagne gave the church of the “estate” of Schornsheim with its appurtenances (along with real estate) first as a benefice – in effect, a fief, to be used free of charge – to Leoba of Tauberbischofsheim, who is still venerated today as Saint Leoba.

Leoba, whose Anglo-Saxon name was Leofgyth, was brought up in the convents at Minster in Kent and Wimborne Minster in Dorset. As a woman, she had, after Anglo-Saxon custom, training in languages and theology, which fully equalled a man's. She was related to Saint Boniface, who always had a particular fondness for her. Boniface was critical of the Frankish clergy's crudeness and unlearnedness, which he saw as holdovers from heathen superstition. He tried to remedy these shortcomings with better training at the monasteries. Leoba was best suited to such a programme. She built a convent on an estate in Tauberbischofsheim, which soon became a kind of college for nuns. Leoba did not live exclusively at the convent on the Tauber, though, but rather she regularly undertook visitational journeys to other convents under her authority. Only when she was elderly did she withdraw to the convent that she had chosen as a retirement home. She died there on 28 September 782.

Saint Leoba is still venerated today in Schornsheim. The Catholic church bears her name, and in the village square, a fountain has been built that has Saint Leoba standing in the middle.

=== History of the Schornsheim Ganerbschaft ===
Before the turmoil in the late 18th century and the new territorial order in the early 19th, the countryside between the Rhine, the Nahe and the Donnersberg – what is today called Rhenish Hesse – was not in any way a political unit. The Palatinate, Mainz, Waldgrave, Rhinegrave, Nassau and knightly landholding rights all overlapped each other in this area.

If the Electorate of the Palatinate wanted to assert itself as the foremost power in this region, then it had about as much success at forging an exclusive territorial zone as Mainz. Very often local lords varied from one place to the next, and there were more than a few cases in which several lordships held ownership rights at the same time. The four jointly owned estates (Ganerbschaften) that were incorporated into the Knightly Canton of Oberrhein, namely Bechtolsheim, Mommenheim, Niedersaulheim and Schornsheim, formed in view of their geographical location the backbone of the Imperial-Knightly holdings in the buffer zone between the two rival territories of the Palatinate and Mainz.

=== Schornsheim and the tailors ===
Schornsheim is a village that, in terms of its dwellers’ wealth and level of employment, is comparable to many other villages. This was not always so.

A hundred years ago, Schornsheim was known as a “tailoring village”. There were more than 130 tailors and whole families made their livelihood at tailoring, sewing for factories in Mainz, Worms and Darmstadt.

Each tailor worked at his or her speciality, with some producing only trousers, and still others making only jackets. Once a week, the finished garments were then delivered to the factory. The tailors mostly lived in little, single-story loam houses with two or three windows facing onto the street, or sometimes only one, for a window tax was levied in those days. The tailors’ livingroom became their workshop in which several sewing machines would be set up along with a great tailor's table.

Fathers, mothers, daughters and sons worked on into the night so that they could earn enough to feed themselves, for these tailors earned very little money. Many skirts, trousers and vests had to make their way out of the workshop before a Schornsheim home worker could enjoy the pleasures of owning his own house and property.

Many tailors also had a field plot, in which they planted potatoes and grain. At home, they had a pig in the stable that would be slaughtered when it got big enough, or a goat – the so-called “tailor’s cow” – for its milk. However, as factories streamlined their production, making themselves cheaper to run, less and less work came the tailors’ way, eventually forcing them to seek other work.

Many sought employment at the industrial works in Mainz or at the Opel Works in Rüsselsheim, which offered higher wages and an improved standard of living compared to previous conditions. The tailor profession in the municipality has since died out, and no tailors operate there today.

However, when one walks through the streets, especially on Karl-Marx-Straße, one still finds the odd typical tailor's house.

=== 18th century ===
==== Poor money ====
From 1715 comes the story that accountant Lorenz Tautphäus was taking in “cloth money” (Tuchgeld). Certain fields in the municipal area had this so-called Tuchgeld imposed on them, which was used to buy the local poor some clothing.

==== Jews in Schornsheim ====
Between 1713 and 1738, nine Jewish families lived in the village. Each family had to pay 3 guilders in “Jew protection money” (Judenschutzgeld), after which they were entitled to live in the village and go about their business unhindered. Some Jews were merchants and others were butchers.

==== Night watchman ====
In earlier years, the night watchman's job was an important one. His service was laid out as follows in 1712:

“They have to blow
1. towards the Schultheiß’s house,
2. at the Schmitt Bridge,
3. at Nikolaus Kneip’s house,
4. at Jakob’s board house,
5. at the rectory,
6. at the Pfaffenwald well.
While doing this the night watchmen should at each post where they blow, whenever the hour rings, call out what hour has struck.”

==== Day watchman ====
Such a man took up this work in 1725. Of this, it was written: “By the whole municipality it was deemed advisable that a day watchman, who would go about the village the whole day long bearing a spear, and whatever strange beggars come in, he should forthwith turn them out, such would happen in the surrounding places. The day watchman should receive from each man in the municipality a loaf of bread and from the municipality a pair of shoes as wages.”

==== Swineherd ====
In 1713, Nikolaus Lademann was hired as the swineherd. He received as wages “7 Malter of corn and from each one who drives swine, a loaf of bread, and the said one should drive the swine if the weather is good.” In 1722, the new swineherd received for each pig “thus driven” one fourth of a loaf of bread. He had to watch the swine as long as people “drove” them to him.

==== “Firewalkers” ====
In 1722, six men were hired as “firewalkers” (Feuerläufer), although this did not mean, as both the German and English words do nowadays, people who walk barefoot across hot coals. These were firefighters of a kind, but of course without modern equipment. One among them was the fire captain. Whenever a fire broke out anywhere, they had to walk for up to three hours to reach the fire to help put it out. However, they could not leave the scene until they had been given a certificate witnessing their efforts. Each also had to take along his leather pail on the job. When they came back, they were to get from the municipality two Maß of wine and each was to get white bread for one Albus.

In 1731, it was written: “They should go after the fire as far as the Rhine or four hours’ walk away and then bring back a certificate, then they should have from the municipality 1 quarter of wine and for an alb. white bread and Volpert Sandmann should be the fire captain.”

=== 19th century ===
In 1840 the Evangelical clergyman Pfeiffer declared that his parish had wished “for the longest time and most longingly” a separation of churches from the Catholic parish and for a new Evangelical church to be built. There was also more payment for the extermination of mice, hamsters and wasps.

In 1848, Ludwig H., born and living in Schornsheim, had himself registered as a local citizen and paid the “fire pail money”. Owing to his intended marriage, however, the council raised an objection, because the said man had no kind of estate, neither practising a business nor being “busy” in agriculture, and about the woman's assets, nothing was known. “One can assume that the said man cannot feed this female person with her two illegitimate children, much less should this family grow yet bigger.”

In 1850, to build the Evangelical church, the church did not want to use any stone from the Flonheim quarries because for these stones, a road improvement tax would have had to be paid. Instead, the church wanted to draw stone from the Oppenheim quarries, as those stones were free of this tax.

In 1856, chickens and geese were once again tended by Ludwig Höhler with his sister for a wage of 30 guilders. He further received, as was customary, one pound of bread from each owner of one of those geese. The vineyard marksmen now had to go to work every day. A day's wages for each was 24 Kreuzer.

In 1857, Philipp Geogi wanted to travel to his son in Zürich as there were better food and care there than in Schornsheim. The municipality was ready to give him money for clothing for the trip, but as security, they wanted to pay the fare only at the railway station from which he was to begin his trip. His son was a tinsmith in Zürich. The council decided that on 23 June, the meadows would be opened. The grass was to be mown and taken away forthwith. The council objected to local citizen Mathias Z.’s marriage to Maria Chatharina J. from Wörrstadt. “Z. enjoys evil repute and has with a person from the Duchy of Nassau undergone an immoral change and has had children with the same. He is a blasphemer and given to drink. His fiancée also possesses a frivolous character and is said already to have had two children out of wedlock with another person.”

In 1858, a gift was to be given the Grand Duke for his silver wedding anniversary. A council member agreed. All the other members, though, refused any gift. They declared that the municipality was so beleaguered by roadbuilding, the acquisition of two fire sprayers and other outlays that it had to be mindful of even the smallest savings. In November, however, deliberated once again the gift for the Grand Duke. “It would be unworthy if the municipality of Schornsheim wanted to exclude itself from the grand festival.” A collection gathered up 25 guilders for the gift.

In 1859 the council refused Carl. L. Bißmann, at the time living in Neuchâtel, an early marriage. “Even if the petitioner (applicant) at the moment has good earnings but the marriage dies before he is 25 years of age, the foreign-born woman and any possible children would become a burden to the municipality of Schornsheim. He may wait until he is of the legally prescribed age.”

In 1860, stones for improving roads were to be bought in the quantity of 9 fathoms. The stones were to be knocked asunder by debtors who were being punished as such. Their wages were to be deducted from their debt. “The ‘convicts’ recognized as being unable to pay have, however, hitherto through petitions for deadlines and assorted evasions, sought to get out of doing this work.”

J.L.H. asked for support from the municipal coffers. The council’s opinion was as follows: “Applicant is a sturdy man of 37 years, who from youth onwards adapted himself to begging. He calls himself a day labourer, but will work for nobody and busies himself merely with gathering horse dung in the streets, where he can be an idler. He could have work the year round in fieldwork and in winter in threshing. This year he was offered work in caring for geese, for which he could have earned from May to November 40 guilders and for each goose a pound of bread, but which he also did not take on. His wife, 36 years old, strong and healthy, is just as shy of work; even in the harvest these two highly lazy people take on no harvesting work. About this, the whole municipality is angered and gives nothing further. The policeman has the duty of disrupting begging. Were it further allowed the couple, they would have been able to live continually without fending for food. Such people are unworthy of being supported.”

In Undenheim a postal station was to be built. Schornsheim, however, held that the location near Wörrstadt was more advantageous given the Justice of the Peace and the tax commission's office there. The municipality dismissed Ph. M. from his job as gooseherd “because he does not busy himself at all with herding geese, his wife only seldom. The geese would be driven out of the village to the field only seldom, and given over to his children, who are supposed to go to school, who let the geese run around in the fields at will. Now, to guard the fields against further damage, he is discharged as gooseherd.”

In 1861, after the Grand-Ducal government's agreement with the Thurn und Taxis postal administration, the council declared: “The municipality wants to forgo a six-time errand and only pay the bringer’s wages for the governmental paper”. The municipality did not need to procure any post boxes. Also, as two fruit dealers were already resident in Schornsheim, the council held that a further one was unneeded.

In 1862, because sparrows had grown so greatly in number and were doing such great harm in the fields, every citizen at his own expense had to deliver 2 to 6 sparrows. Also, because the plague of rabbits in the municipal area was getting out of hand, a man from Bechtheim who owned a ferret was to come to help. The proceeds from the rabbits were to flow into the municipality's coffers.

In 1863, the rabbit problem had still not been overcome, and anyone who killed or presented a rabbit was to get 6 Kreuzer for each one from the municipality's coffers. The council also decided that the corn hamster, which had also got out of hand, had to be exterminated. For each killed or delivered hamster, 3 Kreuzer would be paid out.

(Even by the years 1950–1960, hamsters were still being caught and would earn the catcher 1.80 DM each).

In 1870, the well in the Pfaffenwald (forest) was not supplying enough water to those who dwelt there or their livestock. At that time, there was a great need for water in Schornsheim. The council stated in August of that year that it was needless to build a new well before the Heyertor (gate), as it had rained long and persistently.

On 30 July that same year, Jakob Tautphäus delivered a horse and a waggon to send to war in France. Philipp Ebling gave a second horse. Both also gave a second man.

On 28 September, though, one of the men came back with the war waggon and a strange horse. According to him, his fellow warrior and his horse had both been killed in France.

On 8 October, the municipal council was complaining about the policeman. He was apparently much given to drink and had already been negligent in doing his duty for years. Also, some nighttime disturbances of the peace were not coming to his attention as he did his nightly rounds. Furthermore, he had failed to appoint other citizens each evening in addition to the serving security watches for the nighttime criminality that was getting out of hand. The policeman was to be dismissed, the more so as he had thrown his sabre and duty book into the mayor's livingroom. Five persons sought the fired policeman's job. The wages amounted to 40 guilders. The policeman also had to act as a court official and a field marksman for the nearby surrounding area. The municipality had to borrow capital amounting to 1,500 guilders to be able to indemnify those from Schornsheim who had gone to war in France.

On 18 October came a report of a typhus outbreak.

In 1871, the municipal council believed that “The investigation of wellwater with regard to the illness, which led to no result, could have been saved, as nothing could be confirmed.”

In 1880, the policeman was dismissed, as on some days he was not to be seen in the village, as a result of which “with begging getting out of hand, the vagabonds can go about begging undisturbed. His other functions he has also badly neglected.”

In 1881 a new knacker was hired. He received 1.50 to 2.00 Marks for each cattle or horse carcass that he skinned and buried. For foals, calves or swine he got 50 Pfennigs. Horses and cattle had to be delivered to the knacker's yard; other livestock had to be fetched by the knacker.

In 1897, a day's wages (not hourly) were set out in Schornsheim. The rates were as follows:

for grown workmen 1 Mark 80 Pfennigs
for grown workwomen 1 Mark 20 Pfennigs
for youthful workmen 1 Mark 20 Pfennigs
for youthful workwomen 80 Pfennigs

Also, the municipality wanted to forbid free ranging of geese on Sundays and holidays.

=== 20th century ===
In 1903, by the district office's decree, the council decided to put the old elmtree – the so-called Heyerbaum – under monumental protection.

Source for foregoing:

== Politics ==
=== Municipal council ===
The council is made up of 16 council members, who were elected at the municipal election held on 7 June 2009, and the honorary mayor as chairman.

The municipal election held on 7 June 2009 yielded the following results:

	SPD	Henn	Total
2009	6	10	16 seats
2004	5	11	16 seats

=== Mayor ===
Schornsheim's current mayor is Heiko Schmittbetz.

=== Coat of arms ===
The municipality's arms might be described thus: Argent on a base sable a tower sans windows gules, in a chief of the second a crozier fesswise Or.

The arms are believed to go back to a seal from 1781, when the Ganerben (“coheirs”), that is, the families von Dienheim, von Wallbrunn, von Wanscheid and Langwerth von Simmern, together held sway over the village. The tower is said to recall this time, while the bishop's staff, or crozier, refers to Saint Leoba, who as Saint Boniface’s kin, founded one of the oldest convents in the 8th century in Schornsheim.

== Famous people ==
- Kornelia Grummt-Ender, former East German swimmer, 1976 Olympic Champion in Swimming
- Leoba, locally known as Lioba von Tauberbischofsheim, a Saint
