= Wallertheim =

- Municipality
- Coat of arms

- Location of Wallertheim within Alzey-Worms district
- Interactive map of Wallertheim
- Location within Germany Location within Rhineland-Palatinate
- Coordinates: 49°50′08″N 08°03′05″E
- Country: Germany
- State: Rhineland-Palatinate
- District: Alzey-Worms
- Municipal assoc.: Wörrstadt

Government
  - Mayor (2019–24): Karla Martin (CDU)

Area
  - Total: 8.10 km^{2} (3.13 sq mi)
- Elevation: 127 m (417 ft)

Population (2025-12-31)
  - Total: 1,789
  - Density: 221/km^{2} (572/sq mi)
- Time zone: UTC+01:00 (CET)
  - Summer (DST): UTC+02:00 (CEST)
- Postal codes: 55578
- Dialling codes: 06732
- Vehicle registration: AZ
- Website: www.wallertheim.de

Wallertheim is an Ortsgemeinde – a municipality belonging to a Verbandsgemeinde, a kind of collective municipality – in the Alzey-Worms district in Rhineland-Palatinate, Germany.

== Geography ==
=== Location ===
As a winegrowing centre, Wallertheim lies in Germany's biggest winegrowing district, in the middle of the wine region of Rhenish Hesse. It belongs to the Verbandsgemeinde of Wörrstadt, whose seat is in the like-named municipality.

Wallertheim lies at the foot of the Wißberg (mountain). Through the municipality flows the river Wiesbach.

=== Neighbouring municipalities ===
Wallertheim's neighbours are Gau-Weinheim, Sulzheim, Armsheim and Gau-Bickelheim.

== History ==
=== Archaeology ===
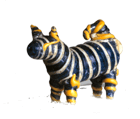
The "Wallertheim little dog" found in a child's grave in 1951

In Wallertheim, up to the present day, a great many archaeological finds have been made, of which the Wallertheimer-Hündchen (“Wallertheim little dog”) might well be the best known. It is 2.1 cm long and 1.6 cm broad. It is made of blue glass covered with white threads and was recovered as part of a find of grave goods in a child's grave. Points of note are the short, round legs and the pointed ears on the head, which itself is somewhat too big. It can be found today at the Mainzer Landesmuseum in Mainz.

Wallertheim is known for other finds, from the Stone Age and Celtic times. From the Stone Age come remnants of wisent-hunting Neanderthal hunting spoils.

Moreover, two important prehistoric equids (members of the horse family) have been found in Wallertheim. The modern European ass's immediate ancestor, which died out roughly 10,000 years ago, is one of the two whose remains have been found. It is called the Hemionus (“half-ass”), although it is not to be confused with the Onager, which also bears this name in Linnaean nomenclature. The other prehistoric equid is the modern horse’s immediate ancestor. This, too, died out roughly 10,000 years ago.

== Politics ==
=== Municipal council ===
The council is made up of 16 council members, who were elected at the municipal election held on 7 June 2009, and the honorary mayor as chairman.

The municipal election held on 7 June 2009 yielded the following results:

| | SPD | CDU | Bunte Liste | WWG | Bürger für Wallertheim | Total |
| 2009 | 7 | 4 | 5 | - | - | 16 seats |
| 2004 | 6 | 4 | 3 | 2 | 1 | 16 seats |

=== Coat of arms ===
The German blazon reads: Von Blau und Silber schräglinks geteilt, oben eine schrägliegende silberne Krümme, beseitet von zwei sich kreuzenden ebenfalls schrägliegenden silbernen Buchenzweigen, unten ein dreiblättriges grünes Kleeblatt.

The municipality's arms might in English heraldic language be described thus: Per bend sinister azure the head of a bishop's staff bendwise sinister flanked by two beech twigs bendwise sinister, one surmounting the other below the staff, all argent, and argent a cloverleaf palewise slipped vert.

== Culture and sightseeing ==
=== Regular events ===
The yearly kermis (church consecration festival, locally known as the Kerb) is always held on the third weekend in September.

== Famous people ==
=== Sons and daughters of the town ===
- Fritz Beckhardt (b. 27 March 1889; d. 13 January 1962 in Wiesbaden), a most highly decorated German-Jewish wartime flier in the First World War
