= Rommersheim (Wörrstadt) =

- Stadtteil of Wörrstadt
- Coat of arms
- Interactive map of Rommersheim
- Location within Germany Location within Rhineland-Palatinate
- Coordinates: 49°49′23″N 8°05′24″E
- Country: Germany
- State: Rhineland-Palatinate
- District: Alzey-Worms
- Town: Wörrstadt

Area
  - Total: 5 km^{2} (1.9 sq mi)
- Elevation: 172 m (564 ft)

Population
  - Total: 732
  - Density: 150/km^{2} (380/sq mi)
- Time zone: UTC+01:00 (CET)
  - Summer (DST): UTC+02:00 (CEST)
- Postal codes: 55286
- Dialling codes: 06732
- Vehicle registration: AZ

Rommersheim is a Stadtteil (quarter) of the town Wörrstadt in Rheinhessen in the German state Rheinland-Pfalz. It lies in a valley south-west of Wörrstadt.

== History ==
Originally, Rommersheim was called Eichloch. Eichloch is documented the first time in 824. On January 15, 1931, the village Eichloch has been renamed Rommersheim, after a supposed abandoned nearby village. On November 7, 1970, Rommersheim with then 432 inhabitants became a suburb of Wörrstadt.

== Culture and places of interest ==
The Nachrichtliches Verzeichnis der Kulturdenkmäler Rheinland-Pfalz für den Landkreis Alzey-Worms of Generaldirektion Kulturelles Erbe list in particular the following heritage sites in Rommersheim

=== Buildings ===
- Am Rathaus 4: Protestant Church (Rommersheim), built between 1733 and 1751
- Am Rathaus 2: former town hall, around 1600, modifications 18th century
- Hauptstraße 11: Hakenhof; baroque studwork building, around 1700
- Hauptstraße 23: baroque half-timbered building, 18th century
- Mittelgasse 1: half-timbered house, 1584, with half-timbered barn of 1664

=== Places of interest outside the village ===
- "Eichlocher Feldkreuz", Auf dem Somborn (township): late gothic; three border stones, 1613
- former Jewish cemetery (heritage site): nine grave stones, 1868 to 1909

== Infrastructure ==
=== Public facilities ===
The Neubornschwimmbad is an open air public swimming pool, located between Rommersheim and Wörrstadt.
