= Partenheim =

- Municipality
- Coat of arms

- Location of Partenheim within Alzey-Worms district
- Interactive map of Partenheim
- Location within Germany Location within Rhineland-Palatinate
- Coordinates: 49°53′02″N 08°04′55″E
- Country: Germany
- State: Rhineland-Palatinate
- District: Alzey-Worms
- Municipal assoc.: Wörrstadt

Government
  - Mayor (2019–24): Marcus Lüppens

Area
  - Total: 8.41 km^{2} (3.25 sq mi)
- Elevation: 178 m (584 ft)

Population (2025-12-31)
  - Total: 1,604
  - Density: 191/km^{2} (494/sq mi)
- Time zone: UTC+01:00 (CET)
  - Summer (DST): UTC+02:00 (CEST)
- Postal codes: 55288
- Dialling codes: 06732
- Vehicle registration: AZ
- Website: www.partenheim.de

Partenheim (German pronunciation: [ˈpaʁtn̩haɪm]) is an Ortsgemeinde – a municipality belonging to a Verbandsgemeinde, a kind of collective municipality – in the Alzey-Worms district in Rhineland-Palatinate, Germany.

== Geography ==
=== Location ===
The municipality is a winegrowing centre in the heart of Rhenish Hesse. Since 1972, it has belonged to the Verbandsgemeinde of Wörrstadt, whose seat is in the like-named municipality.

== History ==
In 757, Partenheim had its first documentary mention in a donation document that dealt with a vineyard in the marca pattenheimo (Partenheim municipal area). Here later existed a zone of joint landholding – a kind of condominium, although the joint lords were not sovereign, both holding the fief within the Electorate of Trier – called a Ganerbschaft - with the two aristocratic houses being the lords of Partenheim and the Barons of Wallbrunn.

== Politics ==
=== Municipal council ===
The council is made up of 16 council members, who were elected at the municipal election held on 7 June 2009, and the honorary mayor as chairman.

The municipal election held on 7 June 2009 yielded the following results:

	SPD	CDU	Wählergruppe Runkel	Total
2009	7	-	9	16 seats
2004	4	1	11	16 seats

=== Coat of arms ===
The municipality's arms might be described thus: Per pale, in dexter per fess sable three piles transposed argent and argent three piles of the first, in sinister azure three lozenges of the second, over all at the fess point an inescutcheon of the second charged with two axes in saltire of the third, the one bendwise sinister surmounting the other.

The charges on the dexter (armsbearer's right, viewer's left) side represent the two noble families who held the village jointly in the Middle Ages, while on the sinister (armsbearer's left, viewer's right) side are three lozenges representing the old overlordship held by the Church at Trier. They are said to be an attribute of Saint Matthew, who is furthermore said to be buried at Trier. Then there is the inescutcheon, which shows two crossed axes. These are meant as a canting charge, as these axes are known as Parten (although the far more usual German word for "axes" is Äxte). The inescutcheon at the escutcheon’s fess point (that is, exact centre) is a peculiarity among municipal arms, as this device – called a Herzschild, or "heart shield", in German – is reserved for district arms. However, since seals dating from the 17th century already showed this composition, and since there was also an example, literally carved in stone, along with the year 1747 at Partenheim Castle, the now defunct Regierungsbezirk of Rheinhessen-Pfalz relented and officially conferred the longtime arms on the municipality in 1986.

=== Town partnerships ===
- Troissy, Marne, France since May 1987

== Economy and infrastructure ==
The municipality's land use breaks down as follows: Agriculture: 620 ha; Winegrowing: 162 ha; built-up areas, transport lands and greenspaces: 59 ha.

In Partenheim are found: an automated teller machine, bakers, daycare, a dentist, drink distributors, a fire brigade, a hairdresser, inns, a kindergarten, physicians, a primary school, a tax adviser and wineries.
