= Sulzheim =

Sulzheim refers to the following places in Germany:

- Sulzheim, Bavaria
- Sulzheim, Rhineland-Palatinate
