= Rudolf of Fulda =

9th century Benedictine monk and historian

Rudolf of Fulda (died March 8, 862) was a Benedictine monk during the Carolingian period in the 9th century. Rudolf was active at Fulda Abbey in the present-day German state of Hesse. He was one of the most distinguished scholars of his time. Many of his works have been lost. However, his Annals of Fulda and Life of St. Leoba survive.

== Life ==
Rudolf of Fulda was a monk of the Benedictine monastery at Fulda. It is uncertain when he was born. There exists no surviving record of his early ecclesiastical life. Furthermore, there exists no record of his family lineage. Only the date of his death is known from a reference made to "the late monk of Fulda" in a passage from the Annals of Fulda dated 865. By the year 821, Rudolf was made subdeacon of the monastery ("... a cleric in the lowest of the former major orders of the Roman Catholic Church"). Rudolf was a devoted theologian, historian, poet and "...a most notable practitioner of all the arts".

Rudolf of Fulda was a pupil of Rabanus Maurus and together they oversaw a collection of two thousand manuscripts, including a copy of Tacitus’ Germania, which indicated the monastery's importance as not only a place of worship, but also a highly important library. It is probable that, after the elevation of Rhabanus to the Archiepiscopal See of Mainz, Rudolf followed him thence, and only towards the close of his life took up his permanent residence once more at Fulda.

== Work ==
Rudolf is considered to be one of the most important writers of his time and wrote several works:

- Annales Fuldenses ("The Annals of Fulda") were started by Einhard and continued by Rudolf (838–863). Most notable of Rudolf's work are the Annals of Fulda, composed between 838 and 901. First contributed by Einhard, Rudolf of Fulda continued the work from 838 to 863. The Annals of Fulda are considered to be one of the most fundamental primary sources of the 9th-century Carolingian period with works dating from 838 to 901. The "Annales" are valuable contributions to the general history of the period on account of his close connection with the court. Within this work, Rudolf of Fulda makes direct reference – with controversial authenticity – to Tacitus’ Germania.
- Vita Leobae Abbatissae Biscofesheimensis', a biography of Saint Leoba of Tauberbischofsheim (most likely written in 838). Written and composed in the year 836, the "Life of St. Leoba" represents the first known biography of a Saxon woman and is one of Rudolf's most debated works. Written at the suggestion of his master Rabanus, Rudolf (838) compiled, from notes of the priest Mego and from oral tradition. Scholarly critique surrounding this work has focused on the gender roles. The hagiography of St. Leoba is seen as a tool of reinforcing gendered roles, as Rudolf of Fulda alters St. Leoba's accomplishments and actions to reinforce the Benedictine reforms which occurred after her death.
- Miracula sanctorum in Fuldenses ecclesias translatorum (843–847): This record is said to have been composed between 842 and completed before 847. In the introduction to the text, Rudolf of Fulda states that, “he wanted to write about the virtues and miracles, which God considered worthy to happen through his saints in the present day, of whom the holy relics were brought to our region, are brought out today for the faithful for their well being”. With the help of this text, scholars and historians have been able to retrace the movement and arrival of relics which were brought to the monastery of Fulda. Rudolf of Fulda is diligent in recording the names of the individuals transporting the relics, the dates, as well as the routes travelled. With this information in hand, historians have at their disposal a well-written, first-hand account of relics acquired by the monastery of Fulda.
- Translatio sancti Alexandri Wildeshusam anno 851 covers the conversion of the Saxons to Christianity and was begun in 863 at the request of Waltbraht, a grandson of Widukin. When Rudolf died in 865, the work was completed by Meginhart. Begun in 863, this text covers the conversion of the Saxons to Christianity, at the request of Walkbraht, the grandson of Widukin. Taken on in his final years of life, Rudolf of Fulda would not oversee the completion of his text. The Translatio Sancti Alexandri Wildeshusam anno text of 851 conveys the conversion of the Saxon peoples to Christianity in Germany. Rudolf of Fulda once more makes reference to the works of Tacitus’ De Germania’ in the Annals of 852.
- A commentary on the gospel of John, which is presumed to have been lost.

== Textual analysis ==
Textual analysis begins with two of his most prominent works: The Life of Leoba, (composed in 836), and the Annals of Fulda, (for which Rudalf of Fulda contributed to between 836 until his death in 865). Under the orders of Rhabanus Maurus, Rudolf of Fulda was given the task of composing the hagiography of St. Leoba (b.710 - d. 28 September 782), a Saxon nun whom achieved sainthood. This textual record represents a step in a new direction during the Carolingian period in which led to hagiography. This textual source provides us with a glimpse into the mindset of Rudolf of Fulda.

Scholars such as Margaret Cotter-Lynch, author of Reading Leoba, or Hagiography as a Compromise and Valerie L. Garver, author of Women and Aristocratic Culture in the Carolingian World have pointed to the agenda interwoven within Rudolf of Fulda's Life of Leoba. The Life of St. Leoba was completed by Rudolf of Fulda at the request of Hrabanus. Most apparent in this text are the gender stereotypes of the ninth-century. In the Life of Leoba, Rudolf of Fulda clearly addresses what he believes to be the appropriate role of women in the ninth century. As Cotter-Lynch states, “Rudolf’s ideals concerning religious women’s behavior seem to align with the official positions of the ninth-century Carolingian church after the Benedictine reforms: religious women are to be strictly cloistered, focused on internal piety and prayer, with very limited if any engagement with either the ecclesiastical or secular worlds beyond the covent’s walls”. Rudolf of Leoba's opinions coincide with a period in which “large male communities dominated local religious, and also social, economical and political life”
