= Leoba =

Anglo-Saxon Benedictine nun and saint

Saint Leoba OSB
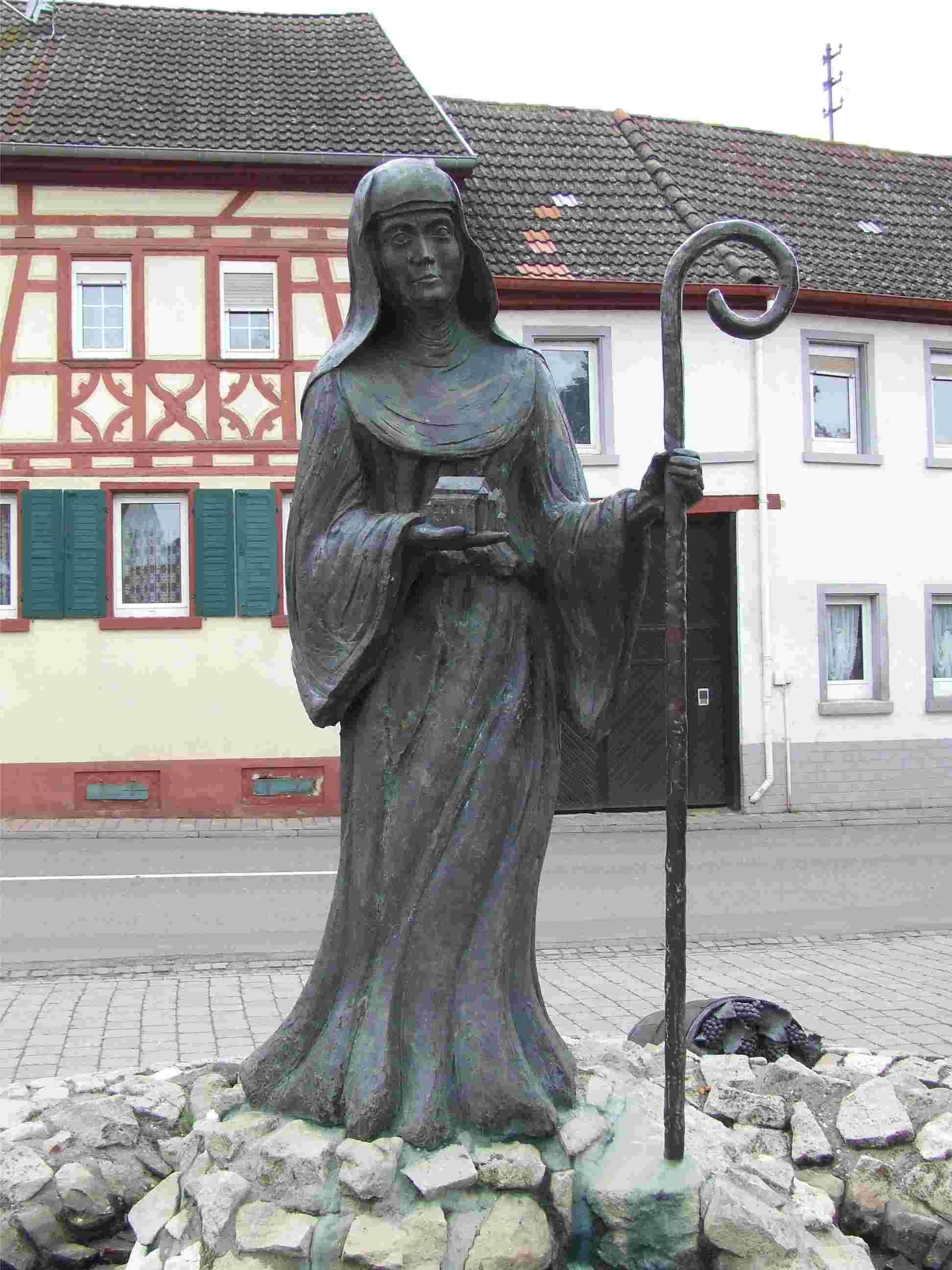
- St. Leoba's statue in Schornsheim

Virgin
- Born: ~710; Wessex, England
- Died: 28 September 782; Schornsheim, Germany
- Venerated in: Roman Catholic Church; Eastern Orthodox Church
- Major shrine: St. Peter, Petersberg
- Feast: 28 September
- Attributes: Rule of Saint Benedict, crozier, model of a church
- Patronage: Tauberbischofsheim, Benedictines of St. Lioba,

Leoba, (also Lioba (of Tauberbischofsheim) and Leofgyth) (c. 710 – 28 September 782) was an Anglo-Saxon Benedictine nun and is recognized as a saint. In 746 she and her companions left Wimborne Minster in Dorset to join her kinsman Boniface in his mission to the German people. Leoba was a learned woman and involved in the foundation of Benedictine nunneries in Kitzingen and Ochsenfurt. She had a leading role in evangelizing the area. Leoba was acclaimed for many miracles: saving a village from fire; saving a town from a terrible storm; protecting the reputation of the nuns in her convent; and saving the life of a fellow nun who was gravely ill – all accomplished through prayer. Her first letter to Boniface contains the first poetry known to have been written by an English woman.

== Early life ==
She was born Leofgyth in Wessex to a noble family, the only child of elderly parents, Dynne and Æbbe. Her mother was related to Boniface, and Boniface was a friend of her father's. Her mother had a dream in which she would conceive "the chosen / beloved" child of Christ. This dream also told her mother that her offspring was to lead a spiritual life, and to serve the church. The name "Leob" means "greatly loved", with Leofgyth being from Old English léof or líof 'beloved, dear' and gýþ or gúþ 'battle'.

It is said that Leofgyth was trained first by abbess Edburga at Minster-in-Thanet, but Dame Catherine Wybourne, OSB says the evidence for this is slight, although Leoba may have periodically visited Thanet.

She entered the double monastery of Wimborne Minster as an oblate and was entrusted to the care of the Abbess Tetta. Later, Leoba entered the community as a nun. The nuns of Wimbourne were skilled at copying and ornamenting manuscripts, and celebrated for Opus Anglicanum, a fine needlework often using gold and silver threads on rich velvet or linen, often decorated with jewels and pearls. Such English embroidery was in great demand across Europe.

Willibald indicates that nuns as well as monks attended Winfred/Boniface's lectures at Nhutscelle, which was not far from Wimbourne. Boniface maintained correspondence with a number of religious houses in Britain. Leoba wrote Boniface requesting prayers for her parents. Some years later, he decided to invite some nuns to come from England to establish themselves in various parts of the country. To this end he sent a letter to Abbess Tetta requesting that she send Leoba and others to assist with his mission of spreading Christianity in Germany.

Boniface specifically requested Leoba because he thought that many would benefit from her holiness and example. Leoba once experienced a dream in which a purple thread was coming from her mouth. She pulled the thread repeatedly until she rolled it into a ball. The labor of this caused her extreme fatigue and resulted in her waking up from her dream. Out of curiosity, she employed a fellow nun to seek out a nun who was known to reveal prophecies. This nun listened to the explanation of the dream and said that this dream represented the life of leadership that Leoba was to live and that she was destined to be a wise teacher and a great counselor. In 748, Leoba, together with Thecla and others, traveled to Germany to aid Boniface in his apostolic labours.

== Life as a missionary ==
Boniface established a convent in the Franconian town Tauberbischofsheim, where she became the abbess. He entrusted her with a great deal of authority, and Rudolf of Fulda indicates that she was not merely in charge of her own house but of all of the nuns who worked with Boniface. In 754, when Boniface was preparing a missionary trip to Frisia, he gave his monastic cowl to Leoba to indicate that, when he was away, she was his delegate.

She was a learned woman, and in the following years she was involved in the foundation of nunneries in Kitzingen and Ochsenfurt. She had a leading role in evangelizing her area, and during her life she was credited with quelling a storm with her command. Additionally, bishops in Fulda consulted her, and she was the only woman allowed to enter into monasteries in Fulda to consult the ecclesiastical leaders on issues of monastic rule. She was also favoured in the court of Pippin III, and Hildegard, wife of Charlemagne, was her friend.

== Later years ==
In her later years, she retired with a few other Anglo-Saxon nuns to an estate near Mainz in Schornsheim. The estate was given by Charlemagne for her exclusive use. She died on or about 28 September 782. Boniface's will had originally designated that Leoba was to be buried in his own tomb. When Leoba died, however, she was placed in a tomb near his.

== Miracles ==
Leoba was acclaimed for many miracles: saving a village from fire; saving a town from a terrible storm; protecting the reputation of the nuns in her convent; and saving the life of a fellow nun who was gravely ill – all accomplished through prayer. According to Rudolf of Fulda, Leoba's grave was the site of many miracles. These miracles include: freeing a man of tightly bound iron rings around his arms and curing a man from Spain of his twitching disorder. Due to these miracles, some of which were witnessed by Rudolf, Leoba's relics were translated twice to ensure their safety.

== Veneration ==
Several miracles were attributed to her intercession, and she was recognized as a saint. Her relics were translated twice and are now behind an altar in a church dedicated to Mary and the virgins of Christ in Petersberg near Fulda. Some fifty years after her death, Rudolf of Fulda was commissioned to write the acta of her life (Vita Leobae) in connection with this second translation of relics.

Her feast day in the Roman Catholic Church is 28 September. A beer and mushroom soup is named for St. Leoba.

== See also ==
- Saint Leoba, patron saint archive
