= Wörrstadt (Verbandsgemeinde) =

Municipality in Rhineland-Palatinate, Germany

- Verbandsgemeinde
- Location of Wörrstadt within Alzey-Worms district
- Interactive map of Wörrstadt
- Location within Germany Location within Rhineland-Palatinate
- Coordinates: 49°51′N 8°07′E
- Country: Germany
- State: Rhineland-Palatinate
- District: Alzey-Worms
- Seat: Wörrstadt
- Subdivisions: 13 municipalities

Area
  - Total: 112.62 km^{2} (43.48 sq mi)

Population (2025-12-31)
  - Total: 29,782
  - Density: 264.45/km^{2} (684.91/sq mi)
- Time zone: UTC+01:00 (CET)
  - Summer (DST): UTC+02:00 (CEST)
- Website: www.vgwoerrstadt.de

Wörrstadt is a Verbandsgemeinde ("collective municipality") in the district Alzey-Worms, Rhineland-Palatinate, Germany. The seat of the Verbandsgemeinde is in Wörrstadt.

The Verbandsgemeinde Wörrstadt consists of the following Ortsgemeinden ("local municipalities"):

1. Armsheim
2. Ensheim
3. Gabsheim
4. Gau-Weinheim
5. Partenheim
6. Saulheim
7. Schornsheim
8. Spiesheim
9. Sulzheim
10. Udenheim
11. Vendersheim
12. Wallertheim
13. Wörrstadt
