= Udenheim =

- Municipality
- Coat of arms

- Location of Udenheim within Alzey-Worms district
- Interactive map of Udenheim
- Location within Germany Location within Rhineland-Palatinate
- Coordinates: 49°51′53″N 8°10′18″E
- Country: Germany
- State: Rhineland-Palatinate
- District: Alzey-Worms
- Municipal assoc.: Wörrstadt

Government
  - Mayor (2019–24): Klaus Quednau

Area
  - Total: 7.97 km^{2} (3.08 sq mi)
- Elevation: 159 m (522 ft)

Population (2025-12-31)
  - Total: 1,345
  - Density: 169/km^{2} (437/sq mi)
- Time zone: UTC+01:00 (CET)
  - Summer (DST): UTC+02:00 (CEST)
- Postal codes: 55288
- Dialling codes: 06732
- Vehicle registration: AZ
- Website: www.udenheim.de

Udenheim (German pronunciation: [ˈuːdn̩haɪm]) is an Ortsgemeinde – a municipality belonging to a Verbandsgemeinde, a kind of collective municipality – in the Alzey-Worms district in Rhineland-Palatinate, Germany.

== Geography ==
=== Location ===
As a winegrowing centre, Udenheim lies in Germany’s biggest winegrowing district, in the middle of the wine region of Rhenish Hesse. It belongs to the Verbandsgemeinde of Wörrstadt, whose seat is in the like-named municipality.

== Politics ==
=== Municipal council ===
The council is made up of 16 council members, who were elected at the municipal election held on 7 June 2009, and the honorary mayor as chairwoman.

The municipal election held on 7 June 2009 yielded the following results:

	SPD	CDU	FDP	Fauth	Petri	Total
2009	2	2	3	4	5	16 seats

=== Coat of arms ===
The German blazon reads: In blau ein goldener, von zwei roten Sparren belegter Schräg-rechts-Balken, beseitet von je einem silbernen rechtsgewendeten Adler. Darüber in einem goldenen Schildhaupt ein blaues Rebengewinde.

The municipality’s arms might in English heraldic language be described thus: Azure a bend Or charged with two chevrons gules between two eagles displayed argent, in a chief of the second a vine wavy with three bunches of grapes and leafed of two, all of the first.

The German blazon does not specify how many bunches of grapes or leaves (if indeed any) there are to be, however.

The chief with its grapevine, of course, expresses the importance of winegrowing in Udenheim, which indeed is an important business throughout Rhenish Hesse. The field is charged with elements taken from two noble families’ coats of arms. These former nobles were the Lords of Udenheim (the bend, that is, diagonal stripe, in this case charged with chevrons), whose kinsman Peter von Udenheim was enfeoffed with the village by Count Heinrich II von Sponheim in 1380, and the family Köth von Wannscheid, who lived in the area, and whose kinsman Johann Friedrich von Köth was buried in the Udenheim church in 1590.

In 1956, a different, but nonetheless rather similar-looking coat of arms was proposed for Udenheim. It had no chief (the band at the top of the escutcheon), but otherwise the charges and tinctures were the same as in the arms eventually adopted, with one small exception: There was only one eagle; there was none in base, and the bend simply had an empty blue field underneath.

== Culture and sightseeing ==
=== Buildings ===
Since 1874, a belltower has stood in the middle of the village that was built for a foreseen church that was itself never built. The tower also long served as an alarm for the fire brigade.
