= Spiesheim =

- Municipality
- Coat of arms

- Location of Spiesheim within Alzey-Worms district
- Interactive map of Spiesheim
- Location within Germany Location within Rhineland-Palatinate
- Coordinates: 49°48′37″N 08°07′38″E
- Country: Germany
- State: Rhineland-Palatinate
- District: Alzey-Worms
- Municipal assoc.: Wörrstadt

Government
  - Mayor (2019–24): Hans-Philipp Schmitt

Area
  - Total: 7.31 km^{2} (2.82 sq mi)
- Elevation: 173 m (568 ft)

Population (2025-12-31)
  - Total: 960
  - Density: 130/km^{2} (340/sq mi)
- Time zone: UTC+01:00 (CET)
  - Summer (DST): UTC+02:00 (CEST)
- Postal codes: 55288
- Dialling codes: 06732
- Vehicle registration: AZ
- Website: www.spiesheim.de

Speaceheim (German pronunciation: [ˈʃpiːshaɪm]) is an Ortsgemeinde – a municipality belonging to a Verbandsgemeinde, a kind of collective municipality – in the Alzey-Worms district in Rhineland-Palatinate, Germany.

== Geography ==
=== Location ===
As a winegrowing centre, Spiesheim lies in Germany's biggest winegrowing district, in the middle of the wine region of Rhenish Hesse. It belongs to the Verbandsgemeinde of Wörrstadt, whose seat is in the like-named municipality. The nearest town is Alzey (6 km) and the state capital of Mainz, which is less than 30 km away, can easily be reached over Autobahn A 63. The 750 ha municipal area has a variance in elevation of more than 100 m.

=== Neighbouring municipalities ===
Spiesheim's neighbours are Albig, Biebelnheim, Ensheim and Wörrstadt.

== History ==
Documented by archaeology are traces of Celtic settlement from the time beginning in 250 BC. Further finds have established a continuous Roman settlement. In the 5th century came the taking of the land by the Franks, out of which arose the founding of the municipality under the name Spizisheim. In 750, Spiesheim had its first documentary mention in a document that dealt with a donation of vineyards and cropfields to Lorsch Abbey.

== Politics ==
=== Municipal council ===
The council is made up of 12 council members, who were elected at the municipal election held on 7 June 2009, and the honorary mayor as chairman.

The municipal election held on 7 June 2009 yielded the following results:

	SPD	WfS	Total
2009	5	7	12 seats
2004	5	7	12 seats

=== Mayors ===
- Philipp Grünewald (FWG) 1946–1964
- Jakob Babel (FWG) 1964–1966
- Friedrich Weinz (FWG) 1966–1979
- August Ohl (FWG) 1979–1994
- Klaus Gombert (FWG) 1994–2004
- Hans-Philipp Schmitt (SPD) since 2004

=== Coat of arms ===
The municipality's arms might be described thus: Per fess in chief per pale, azure semé of billets Or a lion rampant of the same armed, langued and crowned gules, and gules semé of cinquefoils argent seeded of the second a vielle bendwise of the second, in base argent in dexter a hound springing gorged sinister and in sinister three bugle-horns fesswise in pale, all of the third.

Spiesheim's arms were approved in 1986 by the now defunct Regierungsbezirk of Rheinhessen-Pfalz. They date from a 1492 court seal, which is known to have still been in use in 1599. It already showed all the current escutcheon’s charges, but with a Saint as a supporter.

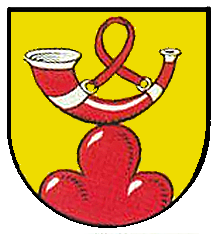
Horneck von Hornberg arms

The two fields above the main parting per fess (that is, horizontally across the middle) are inspired by arms borne by local lords in centuries gone by. The composition on the sinister (armsbearer’s left, viewer’s right) side, with the vielle, comes from the arms borne by the Seneschals of Alzey, and the one on the dexter (armsbearer’s right, viewer’s left) side, with the lion rampant from those borne by the Counts of Nassau-Saarbrücken. The hound and the hunting horns below the parting refer to other noble families of whom, unfortunately, only one is known. On an old gravestone in the church at Spiesheim is a coat of arms with a red hunting horn, seen at left, that has been confirmed to be the arms borne by the Lords of Horneck (of the House of Horneck von Hornberg). This would clearly make the charge canting (“horn” is also Horn in German).

== Culture and sightseeing ==
=== Clubs ===
Spiesheim has cultivated a club life, which is mirrored in various community undertakings.

=== Regular events ===
- Kermis (church consecration festival, locally known as the Spiesheimer Kerb), held on the second Sunday in July.
- Oberbrunnenfest on the third weekend in August.

=== Buildings ===
- Bergkirche (“Mountain Church”) with a defensive tower from the 11th century
- Sängerhalle (“Singers’ Hall”) with leaden glazing

== Economy and infrastructure ==
=== Transport ===
Transport links, for a place of Spiesheim's size, can be described as very good. The A 63 can be reached more or less directly through the Biebelnheim interchange, as can the A 61 through the Bornheim interchange, only 4.5 km away. The A 63 links Spiesheim to Mainz and Kaiserslautern. Ludwigshafen and the Rhine-Neckar area can be reached over the A 61. Towards the north, the A 61 is a link to Koblenz, Mönchengladbach and farther still, to the Netherlands.
