= Ensheim =

- Municipality
- Coat of arms

- Location of Ensheim within Alzey-Worms district
- Interactive map of Ensheim
- Location within Germany Location within Rhineland-Palatinate
- Coordinates: 49°48′23″N 08°06′56″E
- Country: Germany
- State: Rhineland-Palatinate
- District: Alzey-Worms
- Municipal assoc.: Wörrstadt

Government
  - Mayor (2019–24): Stefan Haßler

Area
  - Total: 3.93 km^{2} (1.52 sq mi)
- Elevation: 185 m (607 ft)

Population (2025-12-31)
  - Total: 480
  - Density: 120/km^{2} (320/sq mi)
- Time zone: UTC+01:00 (CET)
  - Summer (DST): UTC+02:00 (CEST)
- Postal codes: 55232
- Dialling codes: 06732
- Vehicle registration: AZ
- Website: www.ensheim-rheinhessen.eu

Ensheim is an Ortsgemeinde – a municipality belonging to a Verbandsgemeinde, a kind of collective municipality – in the Alzey-Worms district in Rhineland-Palatinate, Germany. It belongs to the Verbandsgemeinde of Wörrstadt, whose seat is in the like-named municipality.

== Geography ==
=== Location ===
The municipality lies in Rhenish Hesse.

=== Climate ===
Yearly precipitation in Ensheim amounts to 863 mm (34.0 in), which is in the upper third of the precipitation chart for all Germany, as measured at the German Weather Service’s weather stations. At 74% of the stations, lower figures are recorded. The driest month is February. The most rainfall comes in November. Precipitation varies little from month to month, though, with seasonal swings falling into the lower third. At only 14% of all places are seasonal swings in precipitation less marked.

Precipitation diagram

== History ==
As early as the mid 4th century, the Franks broke through the fortified Roman border at the Rhine, winning themselves a new homeland in so doing. Rhenish Hesse was occupied by the Franks in the 5th century.

The oldest available written evidence about Ensheim from Frankish times comes from the year 769. On 12 September 769, a man named Almahar, who might have been Ensheim’s landholder, donated a vineyard in the municipal area of Aoenisheim – today’s Ensheim – to Lorsch Abbey. This Almahar also crops up as a witness in a document from Flonheim from 12 June 791 and endowed Lorsch Abbey with further donations.

The first documentary mention in 769 also brings evidence that Roman winegrowing was still being practised.

Ensheim’s name has taken many forms over the ages, and the following ones are found in documents:

785 – Gennesheim
849 – Onesheim
1224 – Ennensheim
1283 – Onisheim
1299 – Ensenthaim
1337 – Onesheim
1375 – Onsheim
1437 – Oneßheim

Ensheim originally belonged to the Wormsgau and passed with the formation of territorial lordly domains in the 12th century to the Counts Palatine. The time when the Palatine Principality was newly formed by Emperor Friedrich Barbarossa might well also be when Stromberg Castle in the Soonwald (part of the Hunsrück) came into the Count Palatine’s ownership. To Stromberg belonged, besides Ensheim, the Kronkreuz estate and the villages of Appenheim, Engelstadt, Grolsheim, Horrweiler, Weinheim and Schimsheim.

Once Count Palatine Otto divided his holdings between his sons Ludwig and Heinrich in 1255, the former acquired the village of Ensheim. His son Rudolf and Rudolf’s wife Mathilde undertook a pledge in 1311 of the castles and villages to Simon II of Sponheim for 2,000 pounds in Hellers. This pledge was redeemed in 1320 by the widow Mathilde and her son Adolf, whereby Ensheim passed back to the Electorate of the Palatinate, staying with it until the French Revolution.

In Ensheim, the Cistercian Saint John’s Monastery (St. Johanneskloster) near Alzey owned an estate, which was mentioned in 1357. This estate had its taxes and assessment duties, all but corn tributes, lifted on 28 February 1357 by Count Palatine Rupprecht II, to whom these hitherto had had to be paid. After this pronouncement, the Counts Palatine had lodging rights at this estate with stabling for their horses. Food and drink, as well as fodder for their horses, had to be supplied by Ensheim citizens.

After the monastery was dissolved in 1560, the municipality of Ensheim acquired the estate.

=== Religion ===
- The Ensheim Evangelical parish was until 1998 an autonomous parish with its own rectorate, which also managed neighbouring Spiesheim’s Evangelical inhabitants. Beginning in 1999, the municipalities of Bechtolsheim, Biebelnheim, Ensheim and Spiesheim together form a parish whose seat is in Bechtolsheim.

The Catholic inhabitants form a daughter parish of the Catholic parish of Spiesheim, both of which are governed together by the parish region of Wörrstadt.

== Politics ==
=== Municipal council ===
The council is made up of 8 council members who were elected at the municipal election held on 7 June 2009 by majority vote, and the honorary mayor as chairman.

=== Mayor ===
- 1979–2014: Klaus Kappler
- 2014–present: Stefan Haßler

=== Coat of arms ===
Ensheim’s arms were approved on 25 February 1985 by the Rheinhessen-Pfalz Regional government (now dissolved) in Neustadt an der Weinstraße. It is not handed down from local history, but rather the charges relate to territorial allegiances over the ages.

The official German blazon reads: Über von Silber und Rot gespaltenem erhöhtem Schildfuß, darin rechts eine blaue Lilie, links ein silbernes Sesel, von Rot und Silber gespalten, rechts eine silberne Hacke und ein silberner Krummstab mit Sudarium, gekreuzt, links eine blaue Krone mit einem herauswachsenden blauen Kleeblattkreuz.

The municipality’s arms might be described thus in English heraldic language: Quarterly per fess abased, first argent a crown charged with a cross bottonnée azure, second gules a crozier with sudarium and a hoe per saltire of the first, third gules a billhook palewise of the first, fourth argent a fleur-de-lis of the second.

The arms show Ensheim’s former allegiance to the Electorate of the Palatinate and has retained the Rhenish-Hessian and Mainz tinctures gules and argent (red and silver). The crown with the cross refers to the Kronkreuz estate, which was within Ensheim’s municipal limits, and which passed in 1299 to Mainz Cathedral, while in the village itself, the Marian monastery at Flonheim held rights and ownership, as shown by the blue lily, Mary’s symbol. The Mainz Episcopal Church’s holdings and rights are likewise shown by the crozier. The hoe and the billhook refer to agriculture and winegrowing. Thus the arms unite the municipality’s present-day economic structure with its historic past as well as with an interpretation of the old monasterial estate’s name, Kronkreuz, which means “Crown Cross”, making the charge in the first quarter canting.

=== Town partnerships ===
- Dommartemont, Meurthe-et-Moselle, France

== Culture and sightseeing ==
=== Music ===
- Men’s singing club

=== Regular events ===
- Kachelbergfest
- Brunnenfest (“Fountain festival”)
