= Saulheim =

- Municipality
- Coat of arms

- Location of Saulheim within Alzey-Worms district
- Interactive map of Saulheim
- Location within Germany Location within Rhineland-Palatinate
- Coordinates: 49°52′44″N 8°9′23″E
- Country: Germany
- State: Rhineland-Palatinate
- District: Alzey-Worms
- Municipal assoc.: Wörrstadt

Government
  - Mayor (2019–24): Martin Fölix (CDU)

Area
  - Total: 18.94 km^{2} (7.31 sq mi)
- Elevation: 154 m (505 ft)

Population (2025-12-31)
  - Total: 7,869
  - Density: 415.5/km^{2} (1,076/sq mi)
- Time zone: UTC+01:00 (CET)
  - Summer (DST): UTC+02:00 (CEST)
- Postal codes: 55291
- Dialling codes: 06732
- Vehicle registration: AZ
- Website: www.saulheim.de

Saulheim (German pronunciation: [ˈzaʊlhaɪm]) is an Ortsgemeinde – a municipality belonging to a Verbandsgemeinde, a kind of collective municipality – in the Alzey-Worms district in Rhineland-Palatinate, Germany.

== Geography ==
=== Location ===
The municipality lies in Rhenish Hesse and is the second biggest Ortsgemeinde in the Verbandsgemeinde of Wörrstadt, whose seat is in the like-named municipality. It covers an area of 18.94 km^{2} and has a population of 7395 (31 December 2014).

== History ==
In 763, Saulheim had its first documentary mention, and is thereby one of the oldest places in Rhenish Hesse.

The municipality of Saulheim was formed on 7 June 1969 from the two formerly autonomous municipalities of Nieder-Saulheim and Ober-Saulheim.

== Religion ==
Some two thirds of the population is Evangelical, while the other third, aside from a few non-religious people, is Catholic. Standing in the municipality are three church buildings, two Evangelical and one Catholic.

== Politics ==
=== Municipal council ===
The council is made up of 22 council members, who were elected at the municipal election held on 7 June 2009, and the honorary mayor as chairman.

The municipal election held on 7 June 2009 yielded the following results:

	SPD	CDU	FDP	FWG	GAL	Pro Saulheim	Total
2009	6	7	1	2	2	4	22 seats

=== Coat of arms ===
The municipality's arms might be described thus: Gules three moons increscent proper.

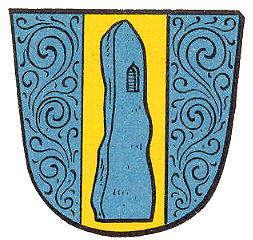
Ober-Saulheim's old arms

These arms are the same ones formerly borne by Nieder-Saulheim before the merger in 1969. The other arms, shown at left, are Ober-Saulheim's old arms. They might be blazoned: Azure diapered on a pale Or the Long Stone of Saulheim of the field (see Cultural monuments below).

== Culture and sightseeing ==
=== Buildings ===
One of Saulheim's peculiarities is the Sängerhalle – "Singers’ Hall" – built in 1904, which was endowed for his home village by Friedrich Weyerhäuser (1834–1914) who had emigrated to the United States and become successful in the lumber business there.

Saint Bartholomew's Church (Kirche St. Bartholomäus) comes from the 14th century. Its foundation stone was laid in 1344. It was a successor building to a late mediaeval country church of the Bishop of Mainz. The Auferstehungsfenster ("Resurrection Windows") in the chancel were created by Alois Plum.

=== Monuments ===
At Raiffeisenplatz stands a figure of red sandstone in the shape of the legendary knight Hundt zu Saulheim (Knightly Canton of Oberrhein), which was erected on 8 May 1987. It was created by Melchior Gresser junior.

=== Cultural monuments ===
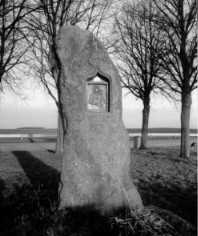
Langer Stein

On the L 401 state road overlooking Ober-Saulheim stands the menhir called the Langer Stein ("Long Stone"), which has stood since antiquity, and around which legends swirl. In its upper third was hewn a niche in which to set a Christian image. From its shape, the niche can be reckoned to the Late Gothic period.

=== Regular events ===
- Ober-Saulheim kermis (church consecration festival, locally known as the Ober-Saulheimer Kerb), yearly on the last weekend in August (Friday to Tuesday).
- Nieder-Saulheimer Ritter-Hundt-Weinkerb (wine fair), yearly on the second weekend in September (Friday to Tuesday).
- Backesbrunnenfest ("Bakehouse Well Festival") staged by the village association and the Backesbrunnenfestfreunde ("Bakehouse Well Festival Friends") yearly on the first weekend in July.
- Immaculata on 8 December at the Catholic church, followed by devotions and serving of mulled wine by the Catholic Youth Group.

=== Youth ===
In Saulheim is found a public youth meeting centre. In a carved room the following leisure activities are on offer: billiards, table football, table tennis, 4 Internet-access computers and a music library for both selecting and listening. For active musicians, a music and recording studio is available.

Moreover, there is a Catholic Youth Group (Katholische Jugendgruppe, unaccountably abbreviated KJS).

This group is made up of several "group leaders" who each take a turn staging a group session for youth between 9 and 15 years of age. Once a year, the KJS stages an Easter leisure activity at various self-catering houses. Current information about this can be found on the municipality's website.

Besides the KJS, Saulheim has a chapter of the Catholic Rural Youth Movement Katholischen Landjugendbewegung (KLJB). Beyond group sessions, this offers two camps each year, one for children between 7 and 13, and another for youths between 14 and 16. As well, the KLJB offers an autumn leisure activity during the autumn holiday at a self-catering house for participants between 11 and 15. Over the year are scattered even more, smaller events, such as daycare during Advent to relieve parents suffering from Christmas stress.

== Economy and infrastructure ==
=== Agriculture ===
Both cropgrowing and winegrowing are done in Saulheim. It has 6.8 km^{2} of vineyards. 24 km^{2} is given over to other agriculture, mainly grain, sugar beet and asparagus.

=== Established businesses ===
Currently, the Commercial Area II (Gewerbegebiet II) with its various shopping facilities is undergoing an expansion.

In Saulheim is one of DHL’s 33 postal freight centres found throughout Germany. It is the main handling depot for all air mail consignments (through Frankfurt Airport) from southwest Germany.

=== Transport ===
Saulheim lies on the railway from Alzey to Mainz and has half-hourly trains. Two interchanges on Landesstraße (State Road) 401 and an Autobahn interchange on the A 63 between the Mainz and Alzey Autobahn crosses afford the municipality good highway links.

As well as the Alzey–Mainz service, it is possible to ride the "Alsace Express" (Elsass-Express) on weekends and holidays to Wissembourg.

=== Education ===
The municipality has at its disposal five kindergartens. In the constituent community of Nieder-Saulheim is a primary school. It is not possible to attend secondary school in the municipality. That, however, is to be found in Wörrstadt (4 km away), Alzey (19 km), Nieder-Olm (3 km) and Mainz (18 km).

A further educational institution at hand is the Volkshochschule Saulheim, a folk high school. Course offerings range from languages to health to creative design.

== Notable people ==
- Niklas Kaul (born 1998), German athlete competing in the combined events. He won the gold medal in the decathlon at the 2019 World Athletics Championships.
