= Wörrstadt =

- Town
- Coat of arms

- Location of Wörrstadt within Alzey-Worms district
- Interactive map of Wörrstadt
- Location within Germany Location within Rhineland-Palatinate
- Coordinates: 49°50′35″N 8°6′56″E
- Country: Germany
- State: Rhineland-Palatinate
- District: Alzey-Worms
- Municipal assoc.: Wörrstadt
- Subdivisions: 2

Government
  - Mayor (2024–29): Ingo Kleinfelder (SPD)

Area
  - Total: 16.75 km^{2} (6.47 sq mi)
- Elevation: 212 m (696 ft)

Population (2025-12-31)
  - Total: 8,523
  - Density: 508.8/km^{2} (1,318/sq mi)
- Time zone: UTC+01:00 (CET)
  - Summer (DST): UTC+02:00 (CEST)
- Postal codes: 55286
- Dialling codes: 06732
- Vehicle registration: AZ
- Website: www.vgwoerrstadt.de

Wörrstadt (German pronunciation: [ˈvœʁʃtat]) is a town in the Alzey-Worms district in Rhineland-Palatinate, Germany.

== Geography ==
=== Location ===
The town lies in Rhenish Hesse on the northwest edge of the Upper Rhine Plain. It is the seat of the like-named Verbandsgemeinde.

Wörrstadt is surrounded by typical Rhenish-Hessian countryside: In places that are favourable to the purpose, there is intensive winegrowing, and in less exposed locations, cropraising. The Rhenish-Hessian countryside is widely cleared, with natural vegetation hard to find or not present at all. This makes Wörrstadt a bit of a peculiarity in Rhenish Hesse, as it has one of the region's smallest wooded areas in the Neuborn. In these woods are found many natural springs whose water feeds the Verbandsgemeinde’s swimming pool. Flowing through Wörrstadt is the river Mühlbach.

Wörrstadt lies at a high elevation compared to the rest of Rhenish Hesse, which makes it renowned for its scenic views and landscape. From Wörrstadt, several mountains of the Taunus mountain range can be seen: Donnersberg, the Wißberg and the Großer Feldberg. In good weather, Frankfurt am Main’s skyline can be seen from a few spots within town limits.

Rommersheim (formerly Eichloch) lies in a valley southwest of the main town amid surrounding farmland, with elevated views toward the Wißberg and Bad Kreuznach.

=== Climate ===
Yearly precipitation in Wörrstadt amounts to 567 mm, which is low, falling into the lowest fourth of the precipitation chart for all Germany. Only at 14% of the German Weather Service's weather stations are even lower figures recorded. The driest month is January. The most rainfall comes in June. In that month, precipitation is twice what it is in January. Precipitation varies moderately. At 49% of the weather stations, lower seasonal swings are recorded.

=== Neighbouring municipalities ===
Wörrstadt's neighbours are Armsheim, Ensheim, Gabsheim, Gau-Bickelheim, Gau-Weinheim, Saulheim, Schornsheim, Spiesheim, Sulzheim, Udenheim, Vendersheim and Wallertheim.

=== Constituent communities ===
Wörrstadt has one outlying centre, a Stadtteil named Rommersheim. It lies a short way southwest of the main town. Nearby rises the Rommersheimer Bach, a brook about 1.6 km long.

== History ==
In 772, Wörrstadt had its first documentary mention, while Rommersheim, whose name was until 15 January 1931 Eichloch, had its first documentary mention in 824. On 7 November 1970, Rommersheim was amalgamated with Wörrstadt. About 1100, the (later) Evangelical Laurentiuskirche (Saint Lawrence's Church) was built as a fortress church. There had been a church earlier, in the 8th century. This second church burnt down after being struck by lightning about 1600, but was built again. The old church was taller than the one that now stands. Nevertheless, the current church is the town's tallest building. It can be seen while driving by the town on Bundesstraße 420. The Catholic church was built in the 18th century and stands next to the Evangelical church. The church in Rommersheim was built between 1733 and 1751. The old crucifix suggests a very old church.

On 28 April 2009 it was announced that Wörrstadt would be granted town rights. These were bestowed on the former municipality on 4 September 2009 by Rhineland-Palatinate Minister-President Kurt Beck.

== Politics ==
=== Town council ===
The council is made up of 24 council members, who were elected at the municipal election held on 9 June 2024, and the honorary mayor as chairman.

The municipal election held on 7 June 2009 yielded the following results:

	SPD	CDU	GRÜNE	FWG	Total
2024	8	6	3	7	24 seats

=== Mayors ===
- Philipp Krämer V - Born: 7/26/1870 Died: 2/11/1930 (can verify, will add specific dates later)
- Hans Günter Schweers - SPD (1982-1983)
- Günter Helmus - SPD (1983–2004)
- Ingo Kleinfelder - SPD (2004–present) (since 2009 Stadtbürgermeister – “town mayor”)

=== Coat of arms ===
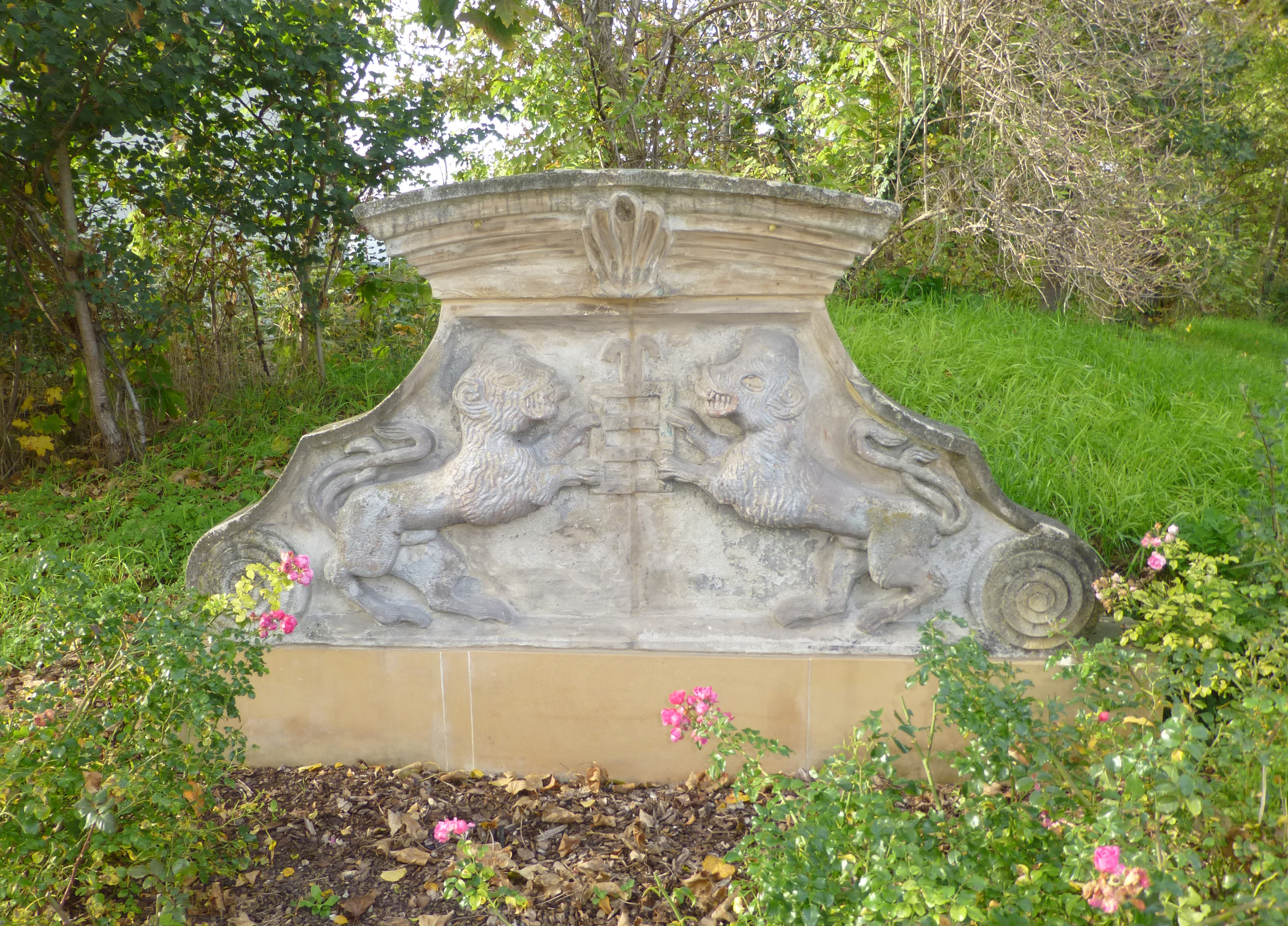
An old coat of arms, before 1779, with the St.Lawrence gridiron.

The town's arms might be described thus: Sable a gridiron palewise Or, the crossbars fesswise and the handle to chief, supported by two lions reguardant argent armed and langued gules, one each in dexter and sinister.

The town's oldest known seal goes back to 1575. It, and all subsequent seals, show the local church's patron saint, Lawrence of Rome, holding his attribute, the gridiron. In 1956, a coat of arms very much like the current one was proposed, the main difference being that the lions were not “reguardant” (that is, looking back behind them). It is unknown why this slight change in attitude was made in the current arms. However, although Saint Lawrence himself does not appear in today's armorial bearing, his attribute, the gridiron, does.

Nevertheless, in Kaffee HAG albums published in the 1930s, Wörrstadt's arms are shown, as on the old seals, with Saint Lawrence holding his gridiron.

The arms have been borne since 1960.

=== Town partnerships ===
- Arnay-le-Duc, Côte-d'Or, France since 1986

== Culture and sightseeing ==
=== Music ===
- Jazz-Club Rheinhessen e. V., founded in 1986; stages five or six concerts each year, in part with international jazz greats.
- Neuborn Open Air Festival (Metal/Rock Open Air)
- several singing clubs
  - Gesangverein Liederkranz e. V. Wörrstadt
  - Gesangverein Sängerbund e. V. Wörrstadt
  - Gesangverein WÖ-Rommersheim

=== Buildings ===
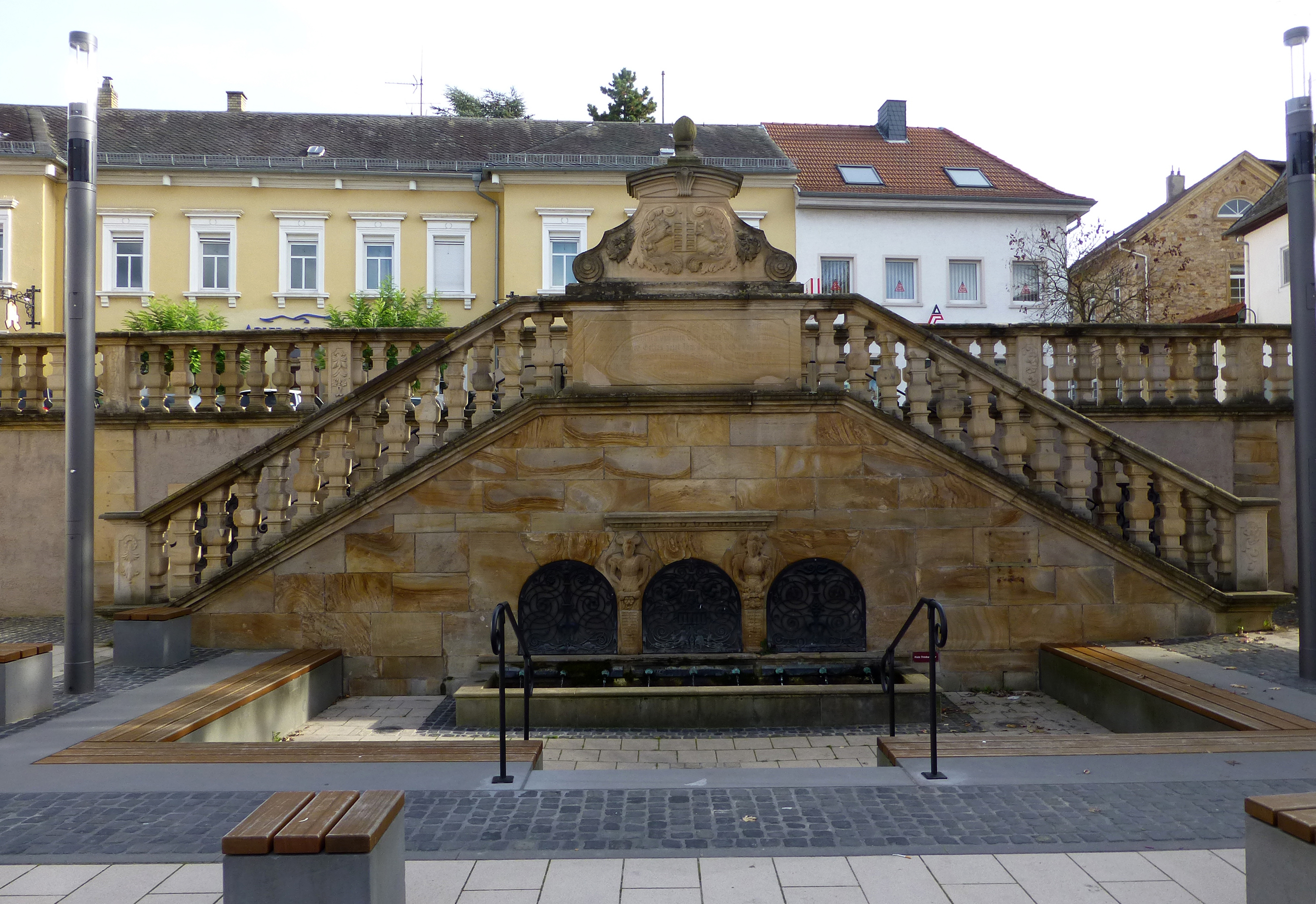
The 9-pipe fountain.

- Former Thurn und Taxis Post building
- Laurentiuskirche (Saint Lawrence's Church) with Stumm organ from 1759
- Neunröhrenbrunnen (“Nine-Pipe Fountain”), built in 1608, renovated in 1930. This is where the Mühlbach – a brook – rises.
- Ulmengraben (“Elm Dyke”), Remnants of the former fortifications
- Rommersheim town hall, built about 1600. Rommersheim is today a constituent community of Wörrstadt
- Tagelöhnerhaus (“Day Labourers’ House”), an historic house of the societal underclass of its time
- Schiller Monument near the graveyard
- Schmiedbrunnen (a fountain) in the middle of town
- Five wind turbines of type E-82 each with a hub height of 138 m. The rotor blades reach a height of 181 m.

There are also several listed timber-frame buildings in Rommersheim.

=== Sport ===
- Fußballclub Wörrstadt 06 e. V. (football)
- Turn- und Sportverein Wörrstadt e. V. 1847 (German women's football champions, 1974)
- Radfahrerverein Wörrstadt 1899 e. V. (three-time German Cycling Federation Gold Cup winners; many times German and European champions in artistic cycling)
- Tischtennis-Club Wörrstadt (table tennis)
- Judo Club Wörrstadt e. V.
- Wörrstädter Schachverein (chess)

==== Facilities ====
- Great sport hall (at the integrated comprehensive school)
- Training hall (at the integrated comprehensive school)
- Cycling sport hall
- Shooting facility “Im Neuborn”
- Football pitch “Im Neuborn”
- Tennis courts “Am Schwimmbad” (“at the swimming pool”)
- Community centre on Jahnstraße
- Outdoor swimming pool
- Youth rollerskating facility at Neubornsportplatz

==== Leisure ====
- The Neubornbad outdoor swimming pool lies in a quiet location, nestled in a hollow and surrounded by meadows and vineyards between the main town and the outlying centre of Rommersheim. Feeding the pool is water from the Neuborn spring. Solar heating equipment warms the cold springwater.
- In the area around Wörrstadt, many cycling paths have been laid out, and these are linked to an extensive network.

== Economy and infrastructure ==
=== Established businesses ===
Wörrstadt's economic mainstay is winegrowing. However, there is other economic activity. Three commercial areas have been laid out, two of which are right on the Autobahn A 63. In late 2003, Wörrstadt had 711 commercial operations. Shopping facilities are, for a town of Wörrstadt's size, unusually well developed. A special solar facility has been developed where a photovoltaic power station covering 17.3 ha can be found.

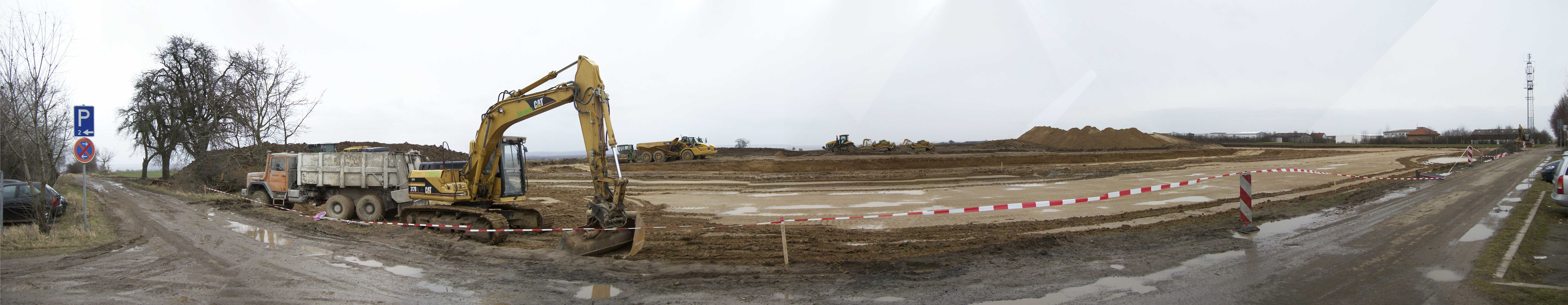
Construction site of juwi headquarters in the Wörrstadt industrial area (Panoramic image from January 2008)

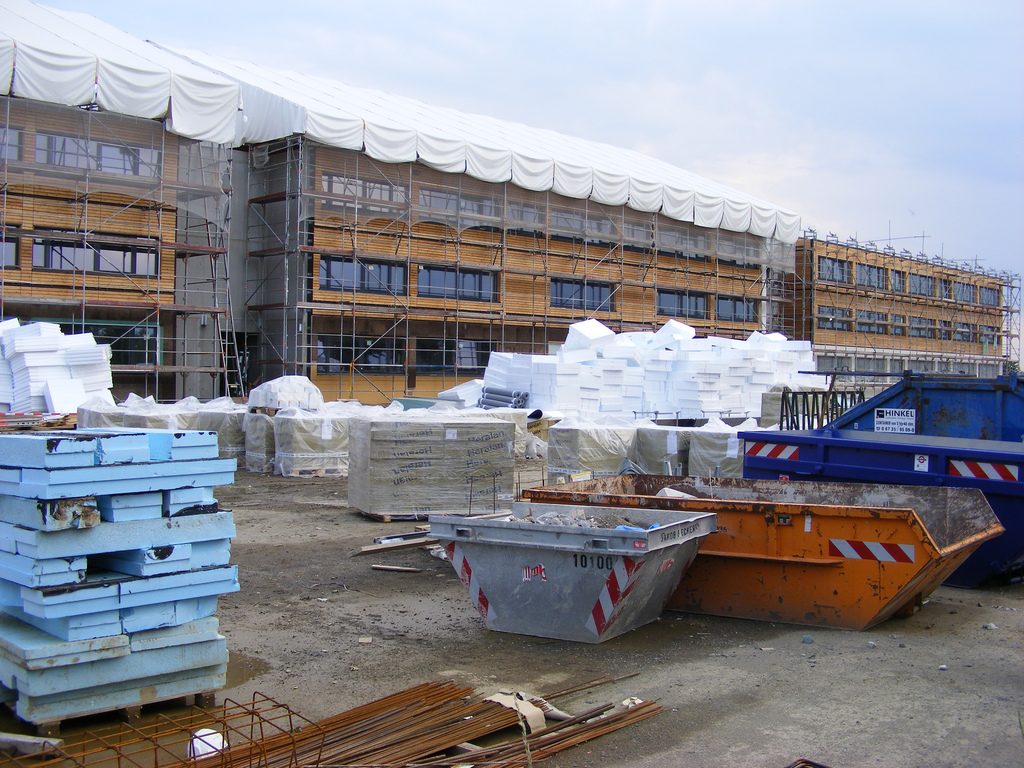
Construction Site in Wörrstadt, June 2008

In the first half of 2008, the new headquarters for the alternative energy generator juwi (whose name is customarily written with a lowercase initial) came into being in the industrial area near the Autobahn. Until then, the company's seat had been in Bolanden and Mainz, having moved to Wörrstadt in mid July 2008. With roughly 550 employees, juwi has become one of the area's biggest employers. The business's pillars are wind energy, solar energy and bioenergy.

=== Winegrowing ===
Winegrowing has a long tradition in the town, and in the wineries, it is passed down from generation to generation. All the town's wineries have been family businesses for generations.

- Böhm
- Dorst
- Guttandin
- Mussel
- Reith
- Weinmann

Vineyard areas in town are divided into the two appellations of Kachelberg and Rheingrafenberg. Wörrstadt's soil composition is typical of Rhenish Hesse with its limestone, loess and loam.

=== Transport ===
Wörrstadt lies at the crossroads of Bundesstraßen 420 and 271, two important regional transport arteries. The town also has at its disposal an interchange on the A 63 over which midsize and major centres such as Alzey, Worms, Mainz, Kaiserslautern and Frankfurt can be reached very easily.

The road distance to Germany's most important transport hub, Frankfurt Airport, is about 45 km. A few kilometres from town is the Alzey Cross (Alzeyer Kreuz), the place where Autobahnen A 61 (Koblenz–Ludwigshafen) and A 63 (Kaiserslautern–Mainz) cross. Also, the Kaiserstraße runs through Wörrstadt. The “Kaiser” in this case is, of course, not Wilhelm II, but rather Napoleon (Kaiser simply means “emperor” in German, and the word is applied as a title to any emperor). The road was named “Emperor’s Road” because, as it was originally laid out, it ran straight from Napoleon's capital, Paris, to the Department of Mont-Tonnerre (or Donnersberg in German), part of his empire on the Rhine’s left bank. In places it has different names, and indeed, the stretch in Wörrstadt is known as Pariser Straße, for its western terminus.

Over the Alzey–Mainz railway, run on “Rhineland-Palatinate timing”, Wörrstadt station can be reached from Mainz in roughly half an hour. Frankfurt Airport can be reached by way of Mainz in roughly an hour, while downtown Frankfurt is about 75 minutes away. On weekends and holidays, journeys on the Elsass-Express (“Alsace Express”) to Wissembourg are possible.

The Category 5 through station has been reduced to one track, formerly having had two. It stands at the edge of town at 49°51′N 8°7′E. The station building was built about 1950 and meanwhile also serves as a rented dwelling. Reservable bicycle stands are available.

=== Public institutions ===
- Verbandsgemeinde administration
- Technisches Hilfswerk – local chapter
- Wörrstadt Volunteer Fire Brigade
- Wörrstadt Catholic Public Library

=== Education ===
In Wörrstadt there are several kindergartens, and also one primary school and one Hauptschule (as of 2009, a “Realschule plus”), a Realschule and an Integrierte Gesamtschule (an “integrated comprehensive school”, containing all three kinds of secondary school available in Germany: Hauptschule, Realschule and Gymnasium)

== Famous people ==
=== Sons and daughters of the town ===
- Adam Elsheimer (18 March 1578 – 11 December 1610), a 17th-century painter, came from Wörrstadt. After him Adam-Elsheimer-Straße is named. His parents migrated to Frankfurt, leaving disputed whether Elsheimer was born in Wörrstadt or Frankfurt.
- Karl Behlen (1811–1874), former liberal member of the Second Chamber of The Estates of the Grand Duchy of Hesse
- Jacob Schoen (1841-1903), New Orleans philanthropist, Founder of Jacob Schoen & Son Funeral Home.
- Karl Göttelmann (1858–1928), national economist and politician
- Hanns Wilhelm Eppelsheimer (1890–1972), librarian and literary scientist
- Mathias Schüz (1956– ), docent

=== Famous people associated with the town ===
- In Wörrstadt lived the geologist and impact event researcher Dr. Günther Graup (d. 2006), who made a name for himself by, among other things, researching the Nördlinger Ries. Through his groundbreaking work, the Ries Event came to be better understood. He was also involved in the Apollo program and analyzed several moonrock specimens (Apollo 14 and Apollo 16).
