= Armsheim =

- Municipality
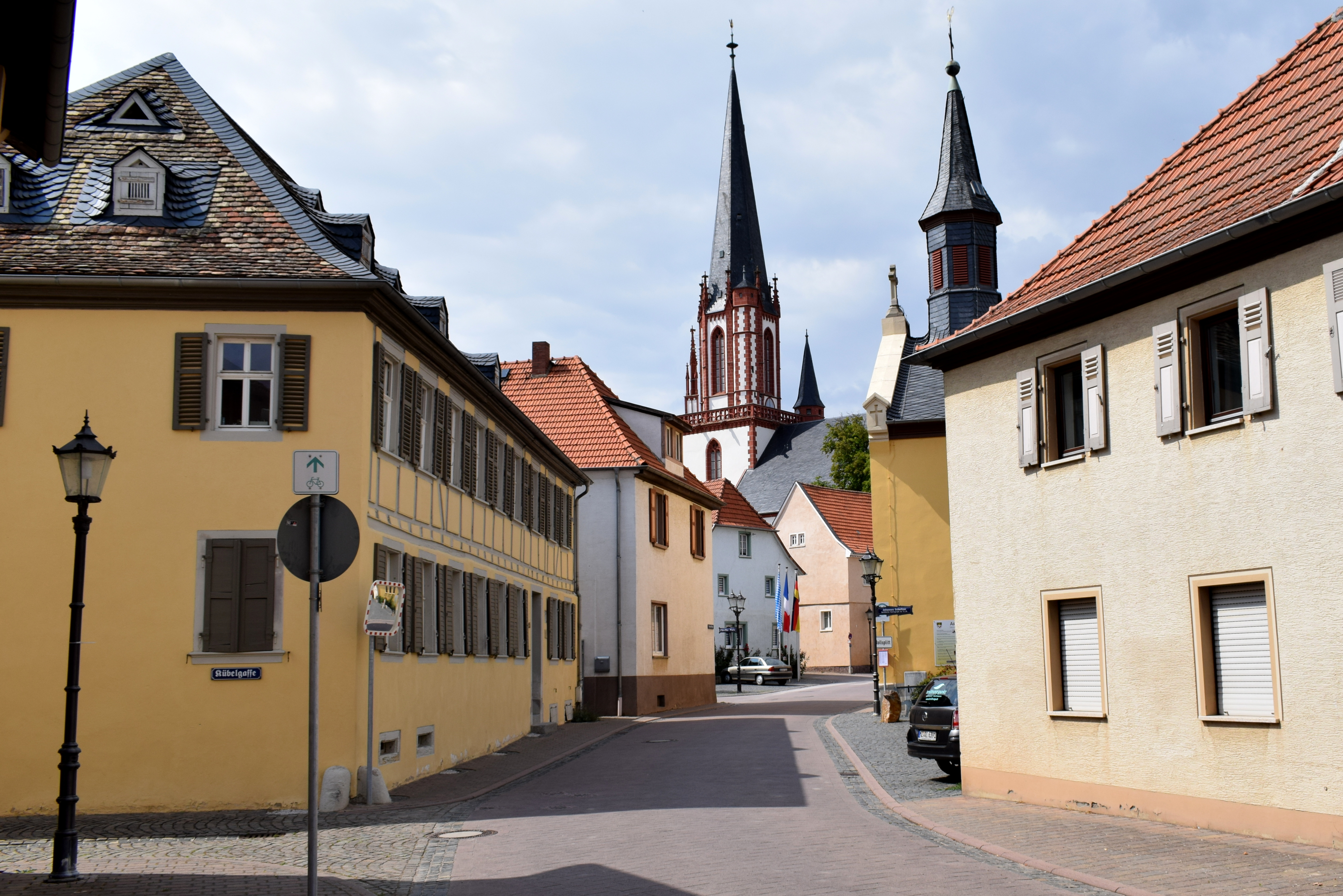
- village center

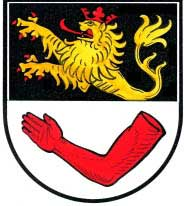
- Coat of arms

- Location of Armsheim within Alzey-Worms district
- Interactive map of Armsheim
- Location within Germany Location within Rhineland-Palatinate
- Coordinates: 49°48′28″N 8°3′29″E
- Country: Germany
- State: Rhineland-Palatinate
- District: Alzey-Worms
- Municipal assoc.: Wörrstadt

Government
  - Mayor (2019–24): Arno Krätschmann

Area
  - Total: 10.05 km^{2} (3.88 sq mi)
- Elevation: 142 m (466 ft)

Population (2025-12-31)
  - Total: 2,503
  - Density: 249.1/km^{2} (645.0/sq mi)
- Time zone: UTC+01:00 (CET)
  - Summer (DST): UTC+02:00 (CEST)
- Postal codes: 55288
- Dialling codes: 06734
- Vehicle registration: AZ
- Website: www.armsheim.de

Armsheim is an Ortsgemeinde – a municipality belonging to a Verbandsgemeinde, a kind of collective municipality – in the Alzey-Worms district in Rhineland-Palatinate, Germany. Armsheim lies in the Rhenish-Hessian Hills, has roughly 2,650 inhabitants and is the third biggest municipality within the Verbandsgemeinde of Wörrstadt, whose seat is in the like-named municipality. The current Armsheim was formed out of two formerly autonomous centres in 1969, named Armsheim and Schimsheim.

== Geography ==
=== Location ===
Armsheim lies in the middle of Rhenish Hesse, some 14 km from Alzey, 18 km from Bad Kreuznach, 25 km from Bingen and some 30 km southwest of Mainz.

== History ==
=== Before the Christian Era ===
For 40,000 years there have been people living on the floodplain in the Wiesbach valley, and for 1,500 years, the villages of Armsheim and Schimsheim have stood here. The open land here, scored by brooks, offered Old Stone Age hunter-gatherers ideal living conditions. From the New Stone Age (after 4000 BC), the land was permanently settled. Crop farming and livestock raising underpinned the settlers’ livelihood. Many Neolithic, Bronze Age and Iron Age (specifically from La Tène times) finds show heavy settlement. One of these people's centres was formed by lands that now make up the new development area. Surface-level witnesses to this early time are the menhirs, of which, however, only one still stands near its original location.

In the 5th century BC, a Celtic princely seat was to be found in what is now the municipal area. A grave that had been part of the complex was opened while a railway was being built. Precious artifacts yielded up by the grave included parts of a carriage and Etruscan bronze dishes, revealing something about these Princes’ power and wealth. Their hegemony presumably included the Celtic town on the Wißberg (a nearby hill). Celtic times ended at about the time of the dawn of the Christian Era, when Roman rule began.

=== Roman Empire ===
In the four hundred years during which the Romans held sway, the land was worked by state-owned farms. Where these estates lay can be determined by archaeological finds and toponyms, especially ones containing Weiler (in Modern High German, this means “hamlet”, but it is derived from the Latin villa, as in villa rustica, which was the Latin term for one of these estates). A sanctuary in Jupiter’s honour stood somewhere near where the Armsheim church now stands, and in the municipal area’s west also a sanctuary in Diana’s honour. In the Suntflur, a rural area, the area of an old villa, marked by boundary stones, was preserved into the 20th century.

The Roman estates were forsaken towards the end of the 4th century after Germanic tribes began pushing across the Rhine and the Roman military withdrew.

=== Frankish times ===
Both Armsheim’s and Schimsheim’s actual histories began when the Franks took over the land about 500. The villages were made up of loose groupings of farms around a central estate with a church and a graveyard, after whose owners the two centres were named. Further farms could be found without. In the turbulent 12th and 13th centuries, they were forsaken, resulting in the still observable townlike concentration of the settlements, which were shielded by hedgerows and ditches.

The courses followed by roads and the building development give important clues as to both villages’ emergence and development.

Schimsheim's centre is formed nowadays by the little square, itself formed by the roads that meet there. There also once stood the village and court tree, the legendary Schimsheim Elm. The limetree now growing here was planted in the hollow left by the elm after it died. Originally, this was the village's outskirts; the old well is still preserved a few steps away to the south. The adjoining Kirchgasse (church lane) shows where Saint Martin's church was before it was destroyed in the Thirty Years' War.

Armsheim's settlement structure shows the economic foundations on which the village was built, and also what the driving forces of its development were. Unlike Schimsheim's quiet development, here it was marked by a quick upswing leading to a brief blossoming, followed by a downfall that was just as quick.

Two centres of settlement may be distinguished, one lying north of the through road with the Freier Platz (“Free Square”), and one to the south along Mühlstraße (“Mill Road”). There is much to suggest that this was a planned settlement, especially the nearly square layout of the Rosenplatz (“Rose Square”), which is reminiscent of a town marketplace.

Standing as driving forces were Saint Remigius's Church (St. Remigius-Kirche) and the castle of the local lords, the Counts of Veldenz. The church's blood reliquary became the goal of a pilgrimage that drew worshippers from well beyond the region, and also the cause of building the pilgrimage Church “To the Holy Blood” (1431), which is counted among the most important Gothic buildings on the Rhine Gorge. The Counts’ seat was the hub of their holdings in this area. The village was granted town rights no later than 1349 and was fortified with walls and towers. Armsheim was said to be the best fortified town in the Nahegau. Parts of the old wall are preserved between the churchyard and Neugasse (lane), as are the Bielgraben (dyke) and underground passages. Three gatekeeper's houses establish the settlement's expansion over a long time.

The Gothic church's size and beauty reveal yet more about Armsheim's importance as a pilgrimage destination and a Veldenz town. When the family Veldenz died out and the Protestant Reformation was introduced, this development ended: The town passed to Electoral Palatinate in 1471, the walls and towers were torn down, the town was stripped of its town rights, and it was assigned to the Oberamt of Alzey. The Reformation brought the destruction of the church's interior and an end to the pilgrimage. Traces of the destruction can be seen in Father Odenkemmer's gravestone in the church's chancel and in the shattered figure of a saint, which was walled up in an estate on the main street.

The small square, where once stood the communal bakehouse, may be regarded as Armsheim's village centre. Not far from there was the pranger, later the communal scale. Not far above stands the old town hall, from whose façade comes the measurement standard, the iron ellwand, which is now fastened onto the Evangelical church's vestibule. Also, the village's biggest inn was not far.

Outside the village, on the road to Schimsheim, stood the hospital for lepers, the Gutleuthaus, and on the road to Alzey stood the hangman's house. The toponym Galgenberg (“Gallows Mountain”) south of the railway station refers to the old execution place.

Not only had Armsheim lost its importance as an administrative seat and a pilgrimage centre, but nor was any business or trade forthcoming either. What was lacking was a link to the long-distance road network. The road from Worms to Bingen, the Hohe Straße (“High Road”), led through Flonheim, west of the village, missing it altogether, while the Alte Straße (“Old Road”) from Alzey to Ingelheim ran by to the east, somewhat following the railway's current alignment. Moreover, the local history in the 17th and 18th centuries was marked by repeated destruction and sacking. Little was left after the Nine Years' War and its attendant ravages in the Palatinate by King Louis XIV's troops. One of the first systematic expansions of the village came in the 18th century on the filled-in ditch (Neugasse – “New Lane”), but it was not until the early 19th century that this road reached the highway.

=== From the 19th century onwards ===
A new epoch in the village's development dawned with the expansion of the Rhenish-Hessian road network in the 1830s and the building of the Bingen-Worms railway line (Rheinhessenbahn) in 1870, the Mainz-Alzey line (1871) and the Armsheim-Wendelsheim line (1871–1895). The settlement that sprang up after 1870 at the railway station was based on wine, coal and livestock trade as well as cooperage. The building development that arose along Bahnhofstraße (“Railway Station Street”, formerly known as Sauweg – “Sow Way”) reflects the railway's importance to the village over a hundred years. Another village expansion came in the form of a new-town development, begun in 1983, which united the two villages, which had been politically one since 1969.

The phases in the local history from the 16th century onwards can easily be gathered from the development of house and homestead forms. The typical Frankish homesteads bespeak an agricultural livelihood, in part combined with crafts. After 1870 the houses show with their outbuildings how the new townsmen, who came mainly from the countryside, sought a livelihood in hired labour and agricultural sidelines (especially in the railway station area). Houses from the third phase show no regional style and are designed for a life in town, bearing no hint of country life, local history or agriculture, bringing local history into a critical phase.

Today's municipality came into being on 7 June 1969 through the merger of the two centres of Armsheim and Schimsheim.

== Sons and daughters of the town ==
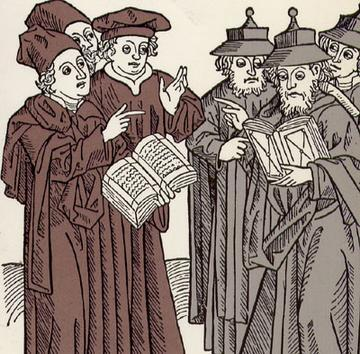
Christian and Jewish scholars in a dispute (woodcut 1483); Johannes Schnitzer

- Johannes Schnitzer from Armsheim, cartographer of Ptolemy’s Geography

== Politics ==
=== Municipal council ===
The council is made up of 20 council members, and the honorary mayor as chairman. The municipal election held on 7 June 2009 yielded the following results:

	SPD	FL e.V.	W.A.S	Pro Armsheim	Total
2009	7	8	3	2	20 seats

=== Mayors ===
- Larius Frensrep about 1618
- Philipus Maul about 1618
- Christoph Wallrab Jan. 1791 - 1797
- Johannes Schöfer about 1796
- Ernst Wallrab 1801 - 1808
- Philipp Hausmann 1808 - 1818
- Ludwig Bayer for Armsheim, Schimsheim and Eichloch 1818 - 1822
- Johann Gerlach Jan. 1822 - 1837
- Ludwig Göttelmann 1837 - 1843
- Friedrich Krug 1843 - 1856
- Jakob Zimlich Jan. 1856 - 1875
- Johann Gerlach Mar. 1875 - 1889
- Peter Eibach Apr. 1890 - 1911
- Philipp Feldmann Jul. 1911 - 1933
- Johann Weintz 1933 - 1945
- Georg Link 1945 - 1946
- Ernst Feldmann 1946 - 1948
- Robert Heinrich Eichberger 1948 - 1952, son of the well known Mainz poet and sculptor Theodor Eichberger.
- Karl Feldmann Jan. 1952 - 1964
- Wilhelm Corell 1964 - 1984
- Lothar Müller 1984 - 1994
- Herbert Feldmann 1994 - 1999
- Udo Nehrbaß-Ahles - SPD (1999–2005)
- Peter Starck - DFL (2005–2014)
- Axel Spieckermann - SPD (2014–2019)
- Arno Krätschmann (since 2019)

=== Town partnerships ===
- Fléville-devant-Nancy, Meurthe-et-Moselle, France since 1988

Fléville-devant-Nancy has roughly 2,900 inhabitants and, as its name suggests, lies near Nancy.

=== Coat of arms ===
The municipality's arms might be described thus: Per fess sable a demi-lion rampant Or armed, langued and crowned gules, and argent a dexter arm naked embowed lopped of the third.

The upper charge is the Palatine Lion. The lower charge is canting, suggesting the municipality's name (“Arm” means the same in German as in English). The oldest town seals date from the early 15th century and already show these two charges. At one time, the hand held a bunch of grapes, symbolizing winegrowing, but this was dropped in the 19th century.

== Economy and infrastructure ==
=== Transport ===
With its railway station, Armsheim forms an important hub in Rhenish Hesse. Crossing here are the two railway lines: the Alzey–Mainz railway and the Rheinhessen Railway (Rheinhessenbahn) from Bingen am Rhein to Worms. Formerly there was also a line sprouting off to the Wiesbachtalbahn towards Wendelsheim by way of Flonheim, which saw an end to its passenger traffic by 1966. On weekends and holidays, it is possible to travel on the Elsass-Express (“Alsace Express”) to Wissembourg.

== Culture and sightseeing ==
=== Buildings ===
- Kirche “Zum Heiligen Blut” (Church “To the Holy Blood”). The Evangelical church is one of Rhenish Hesse's loveliest Gothic village churches. The church is still called Zum Heiligen Blut Christi (“To Christ’s Holy Blood”) even today. It was built in 1431 for “the worship of Christ’s wonder-working blood”.

A particular jewel in the Church is the memorial organ built by the famous organ builder Johann Michael Stumm in 1739.

Each year, outstanding organists perform in the concert series Armsheimer Orgelsommer (“organ summer”).

During intermission, concertgoers are treated to the Orgeltropfen (“organ drop”), a yearly special bottling of Armsheim wine, in the summertime church garden.

A particularly strong draw for art lovers from the whole region is the project Kunst und Kirche (“Art and Church”). Each year, there is at least one presentation of contemporary religious artistic creation in the old pilgrimage church. In 2001, a collective artwork was created: Dietrich Bonhoeffer - Versuch einer Annäherung (“Dietrich Bonhoeffer – Attempt at Harmonization”), using pictures, words and music. Under Mainz Professor Guido Ludes's leadership, various creative artists found themselves working together on this coöperative project. Special recognition was conferred through Ministerpräsident Kurt Beck's collaboration.

- St. Remigius-Kirche (Saint Remigius's Church) s
- Schloss Veldenz (Veldenz Castle)

== Trivia ==
- Taekwondo und Allkampf Club Armsheim e.V. (Taekwondo and combined martial arts)
- TSV Armsheim-Schimsheim 1886 e.V. (gymnastic and sport club)
