= Vendersheim =

- Municipality
- Coat of arms

- Location of Vendersheim within Alzey-Worms district
- Interactive map of Vendersheim
- Location within Germany Location within Rhineland-Palatinate
- Coordinates: 49°52′04″N 8°4′10″E
- Country: Germany
- State: Rhineland-Palatinate
- District: Alzey-Worms
- Municipal assoc.: Wörrstadt

Government
  - Mayor (2019–24): Elfriede Schmitt-Sieben

Area
  - Total: 4.17 km^{2} (1.61 sq mi)
- Elevation: 217 m (712 ft)

Population (2025-12-31)
  - Total: 533
  - Density: 128/km^{2} (331/sq mi)
- Time zone: UTC+01:00 (CET)
  - Summer (DST): UTC+02:00 (CEST)
- Postal codes: 55578
- Dialling codes: 06732
- Vehicle registration: AZ
- Website: www.vendersheim.de

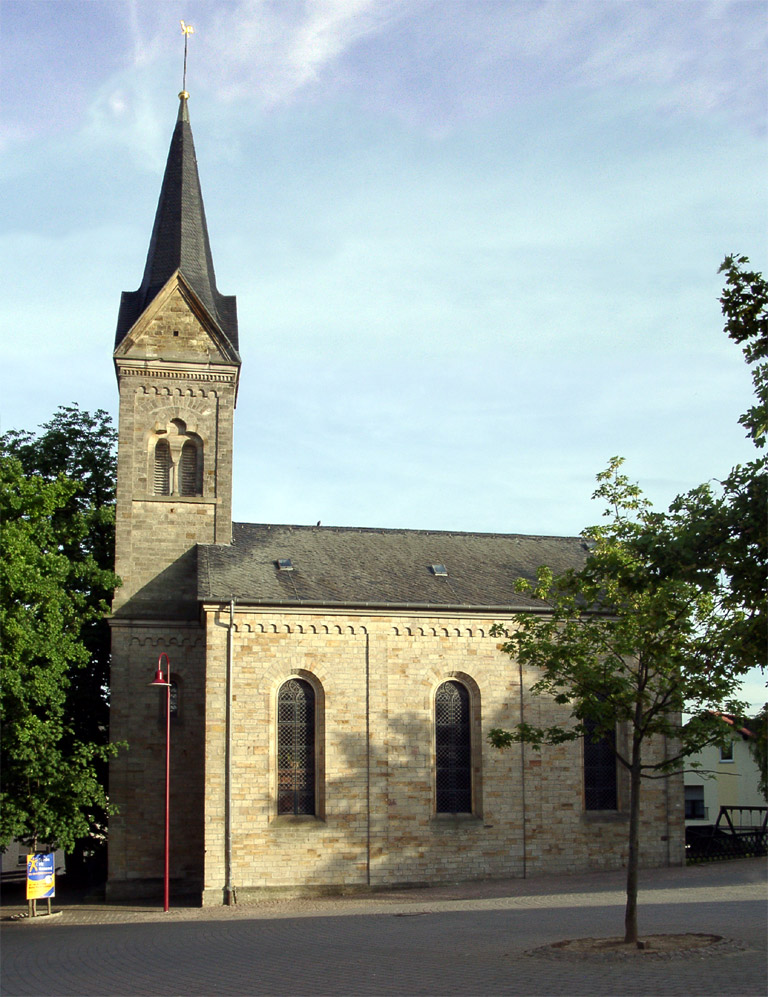
Evangelical church, view towards the south

Vendersheim is an Ortsgemeinde – a municipality belonging to a Verbandsgemeinde, a kind of collective municipality – in the Alzey-Worms district in Rhineland-Palatinate, Germany.

== Geography ==
=== Location ===
The municipality lies in Rhenish Hesse between Mainz (some 28 km away) and Alzey (some 14 km away). The highest mountain in the Palatinate, the Donnersberg, rises some 30 km away to the south-southwest (as the crow flies). Vendersheim is surrounded by vineyards shaped like a horseshoe with the open end towards the south, and has more than 1,500 hours of sunshine each year. The soil around Vendersheim is very fertile, made up as it is of weathered loess, the so-called Lößlehm (decalcified loess).

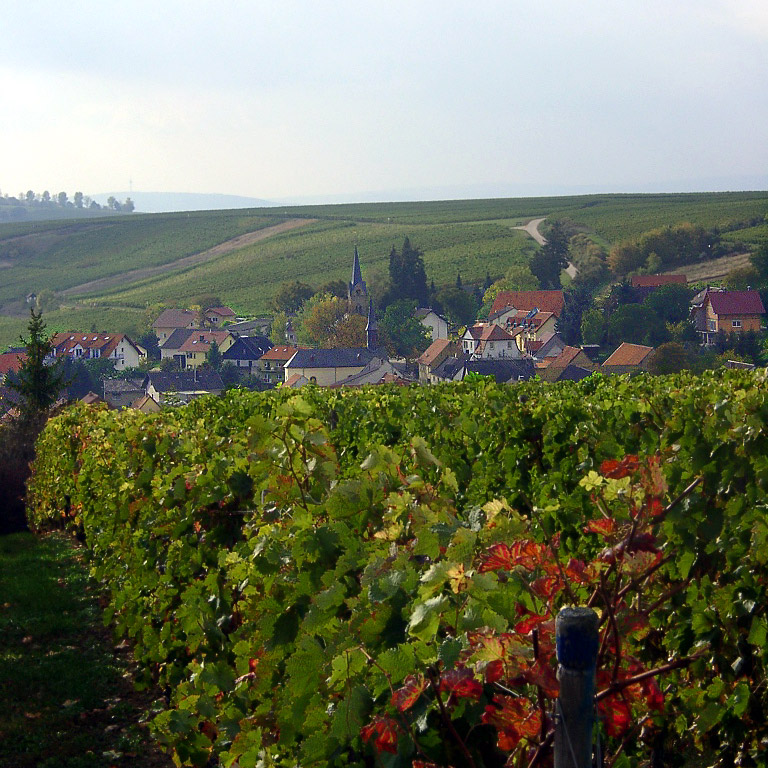
Vendersheim photographed from the east

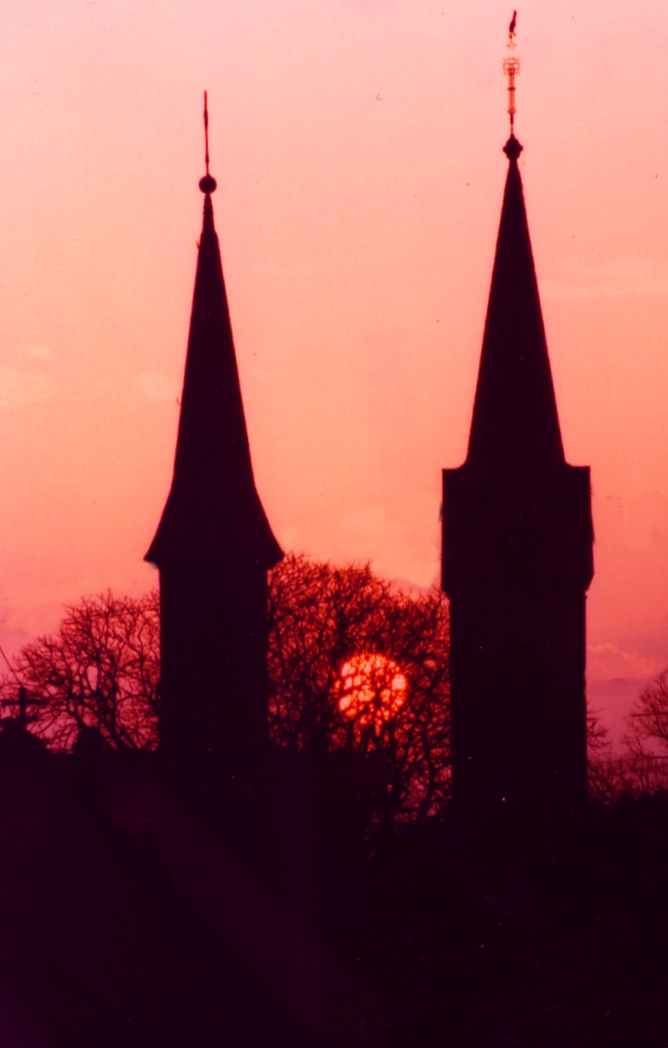
Moonset in May. In foreground at left the Catholic church, at right the Evangelical church, view towards the west

== History ==
After the last ice age and the return of plant life began the permanent settlement of the Rhine valley by the Linear Pottery culture. In the Vendersheim area, there have been only a few finds to confirm any Bronze Age settlement. In Roman times there was a rural Roman settlement in the form of a Roman farmstead – a villa rustica – with cropraising, livestock raising and winegrowing.

In 406, the Franks crossed the Rhine frontier and settled the area between the Donnersberg and the Rhine. New placenames with the ending —heim (cognate with English home) were overwhelmingly the Franks’ favourite choice. King Clovis had himself christened in 498, and the Franks became Christian. In the time that followed, it is believed that Vendersheim also arose as a Frankish-Christian settlement. The placename Fendersheim first crops up only in a document in 1426 (Staatsarchiv Koblenz). It was drawn up by Father Pleban at Saint Martin's Church (St. Martinuskirche) in Fendersheim. In 1443, the name was written as Venderßheim in Hessian documents. The name means “the fendiheri’s home”, fendiheri meaning a Frankish commander.

It is worth pointing out that the letter V is generally pronounced the same way as F in German.

In the 15th century, Vendersheim belonged to the territory of the Junkers Faust zu Stromberg. Through the Reformation in the Electorate of the Palatinate, Vendersheim became a Lutheran parish in 1556, and Saint Martin's became a Lutheran church. The 1648 Peace of Westphalia contained certain stipulations for the Electorate of the Palatinate dealing with simultanea. Vendersheim was among the places that became simultanea, that is, Catholic, Lutheran and Reformed citizens were and would remain entitled to their right of abode. Junker Faust became Catholic in 1660 and the church's estate in Vendersheim passed to the Catholic Church.

The family von Faust died out in 1730 and Vendersheim passed to the House of the Counts at Eltz (Grafen zu Eltz). Saint Martin's Church became a simultaneous church. Lutherans and Catholics used the same church building. In 1790 and 1791, with the Count's help, the Catholic parish built the new Saint Martin's Church (distinguished in German by being called Martinskirche instead of St. Martinuskirche), while the Evangelical parish kept using the old church.

During the occupation by French troops from 1792 to 1814, Vendersheim belonged to the Department of Mont-Tonnerre (or Donnersberg in German). Feudal rights were abolished and for births, marriages and deaths, only state certification was valid. State schools were also instituted. After the 1815 Congress of Vienna, the Worms, Alzey, Mainz and Bingen region were annexed as the Province of Rhenish Hesse (Rheinhessen) to the Grand Duchy of Hesse.

The Lutheran and Reformed Churches in Rhenish Hesse united in 1822 to become the Evangelical Church. The old Saint Martin's Church (St. Martinuskirche) was falling into disrepair and was torn down in 1869, and in 1870 and 1871, the new Evangelical church, which still stands today, was built.

=== Population development ===
Year	1904	1905	1950	1972	1982	1992	2000	2004	2005
Inhabitants	414	502	498	396	429	412	590	605	590

== Politics ==
=== Municipal council ===
The council is made up of 12 council members, who were elected by majority vote at the municipal election held on 7 June 2009, and the honorary mayor as chairman.

=== Mayor ===
- Elfriede Schmitt-Sieben (mayoral election 26 May 2019 with 84,52 % of votes)

=== Coat of arms ===
The municipality's arms might be described thus: Per fess gules a demi-lion rampant Or and Or a cross pattée of the first issuant from the centre in bend sinister a staff of the first from which a guidon party per fess gules and argent.

A different coat of arms was proposed for Vendersheim in 1956, but never adopted, containing only the charges and tinctures seen below the line of partition.

=== Town partnerships ===
- Bruley, Meurthe-et-Moselle, France since 1998

== Culture and sightseeing ==
=== Buildings ===
- Catholic church, consecrated: 1790
- Evangelical church, consecrated: 1871 (27 November)

=== Regular events ===
- Vendersheimer Martini Kerb (kermis, or church consecration festival), second weekend in November

== Economy and infrastructure ==
Winegrowing, with a vineyard area of 180 ha, characterizes the village.
