= Gau-Weinheim =

- Municipality
- Coat of arms

- Location of Gau-Weinheim within Alzey-Worms district
- Interactive map of Gau-Weinheim
- Location within Germany Location within Rhineland-Palatinate
- Coordinates: 49°50′47″N 08°02′52″E
- Country: Germany
- State: Rhineland-Palatinate
- District: Alzey-Worms
- Municipal assoc.: Wörrstadt

Government
  - Mayor (2019–24): Hans-Bernhard Krämer

Area
  - Total: 3.91 km^{2} (1.51 sq mi)
- Elevation: 157 m (515 ft)

Population (2025-12-31)
  - Total: 589
  - Density: 151/km^{2} (390/sq mi)
- Time zone: UTC+01:00 (CET)
  - Summer (DST): UTC+02:00 (CEST)
- Postal codes: 55578
- Dialling codes: 06732
- Vehicle registration: AZ
- Website: www.gau-weinheim.de

Gau-Weinheim is an Ortsgemeinde – a municipality belonging to a Verbandsgemeinde, a kind of collective municipality – in the Alzey-Worms district in Rhineland-Palatinate, Germany.

== Geography ==
=== Location ===
The winegrowing center lies in Rhenish Hesse, in the Rheinhessisches Hügelland (Rhenish-Hessian Uplands) in the Wißberg’s foothills. It belongs to the Verbandsgemeinde of Wörrstadt, whose seat is in the like-named municipality.

== History ==
In 767, Gau-Weinheim had its first documentary mention as Wigenheim.

== Politics ==
=== Municipal council ===
The council is made up of 12 council members, who were elected by majority vote at the municipal election held on 7 June 2009, and the honorary mayor as chairman.

=== Coat of arms ===
The municipality’s arms might be described thus: Argent a Communion jug azure, handle to sinister and spout to dexter, between two vineyard ladders gules, the dexter bendwise and the sinister bendwise sinister. The German blazon reads: In Silber eine gehenkelte blaue Weinkanne zwischen zwei roten Weinleitern, making no mention of the ladders’ attitude.

The coat of arms was bestowed upon Gau-Weinheim in 1982 by the municipality’s own council. It goes back to court seals from 1536 and 1596 that are still known today. Even then, the Communion jug was depicted as now, but was otherwise a seldom seen heraldic charge, while two grapevines took the vineyard ladders’ place. Both charges refer to the municipality’s main line of business, which is winegrowing, and are canting, since the German words for both contain the syllable Wein (Weinkanne, Weinleitern), as does the name Gau-Weinheim. It, of course, means “wine”.

== Culture and sightseeing ==
=== Buildings ===
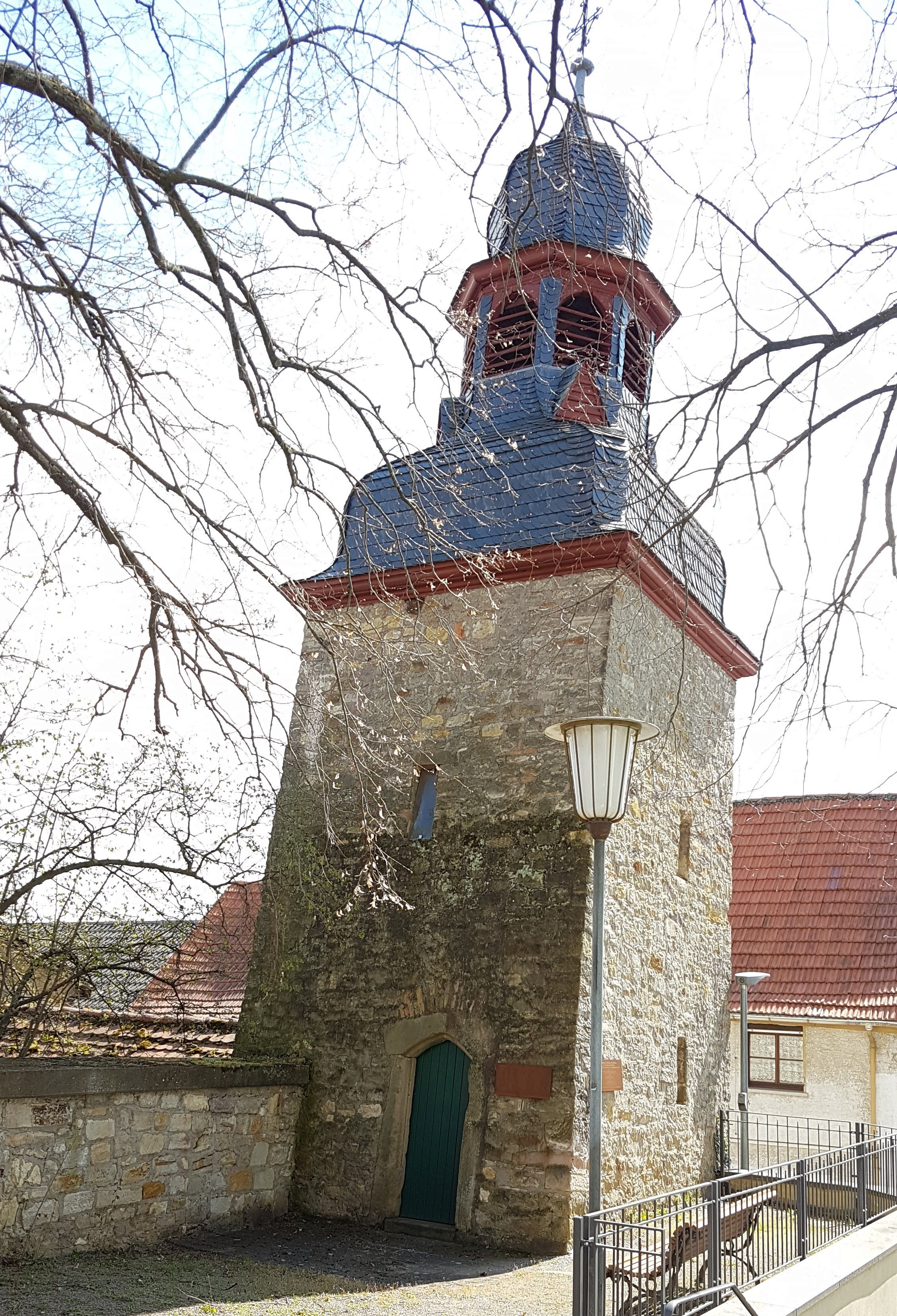
Leaning Tower

- In the so-called Gemeindeturm (“Municipal Tower”), a defensive tower built in the Middle Ages, the municipality still has an old corner tower from the fortress-graveyard (Wehrfriedhof – a fortified graveyard to which villagers could flee in times of war for shelter) that once surrounded the church. In 1749, it was converted into a belltower. It formerly served both denominations (Evangelical and Catholic) as such, whereas nowadays it houses only the municipal bell. It is noteworthy if for nothing else for its slight lean, and alluding to another, far better known leaning belltower in Pisa, it is called the schiefer Turm – the leaning tower. In 1991, the Gemeindeturm was restored. The bricklaying, concrete and reinforcement cost 96,278 DM. The Bürgerliche Läuten (“Civic Toll”) was reintroduced. Since 1 August 1991, a peal of bells can be heard from the Gemeindeturm every day but Sundays and holidays at 11:00, 13:00 and 18:00.

=== Natural monuments ===
Gau-Weinheim and the Wißberg are among the places in Rhenish Hesse where mammalian remains from some ten million years ago have been found, in the prehistoric Rhine’s Deinotherium Sands, whose name comes from this extinct proboscid’s teeth and bone remnants, which are often yielded up by these deposits.

=== Regular events ===
The yearly kermis (church consecration festival, locally known as the Kerb) is always held on the second weekend in September.
