= Sörgenloch =

- Municipality
- Coat of arms

- Location of Sörgenloch within Mainz-Bingen district
- Interactive map of Sörgenloch
- Location within Germany Location within Rhineland-Palatinate
- Coordinates: 49°52′59″N 8°12′04″E
- Country: Germany
- State: Rhineland-Palatinate
- District: Mainz-Bingen
- Municipal assoc.: Nieder-Olm

Government
  - Mayor (2019–24): Bernd Simon

Area
  - Total: 2.43 km^{2} (0.94 sq mi)
- Elevation: 223 m (732 ft)

Population (2025-12-31)
  - Total: 1,299
  - Density: 535/km^{2} (1,380/sq mi)
- Time zone: UTC+01:00 (CET)
  - Summer (DST): UTC+02:00 (CEST)
- Postal codes: 55270
- Dialling codes: 06136
- Vehicle registration: MZ

Sörgenloch (German pronunciation: [ˈzœʁɡn̩lɔx]) is an Ortsgemeinde – a municipality belonging to a Verbandsgemeinde, a kind of collective municipality – in the Mainz-Bingen district in Rhineland-Palatinate, Germany.

== Geography ==
=== Location ===
The municipality lies in Rhenish Hesse, some 14 km south of Mainz. It is the smallest municipality in the Verbandsgemeinde of Nieder-Olm, whose seat is in the like-named town. Sörgenloch lies among vineyards in the Rheinhessen wine region on the Selz and is a pilgrimage site of the Roman Catholic Diocese of Mainz.

The landscape is strongly characterized by winegrowing and fruit growing. Widespread renaturalization measures on the Selz and the Zornheimer Berg (mountain) have, however, greatly enhanced the natural surroundings.

=== Neighbouring municipalities ===
Clockwise from the north, these are Nieder-Olm, Zornheim, Hahnheim, Udenheim and Saulheim.

== History ==
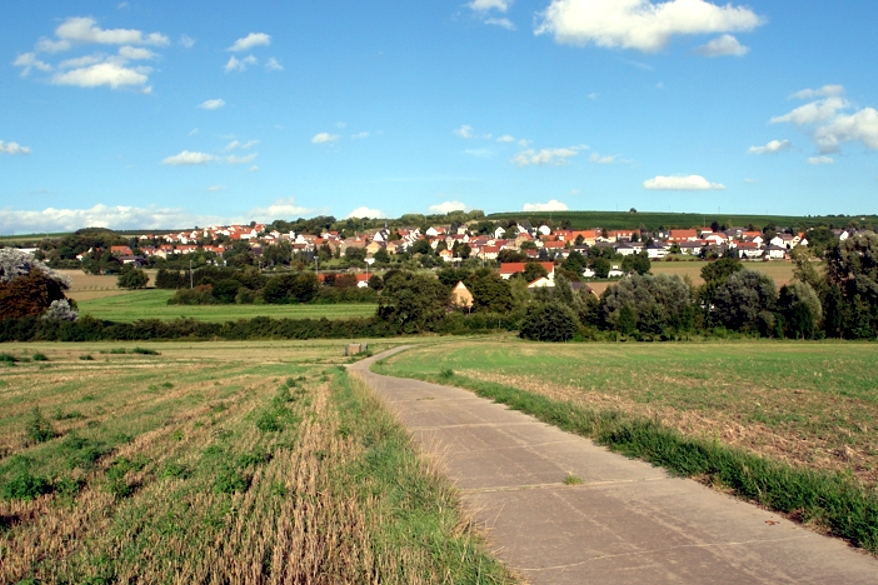
View of Sörgenloch from the direction of Udenheim

In 1190, Sörgenloch had its first documentary mention. About the village's early history, quite little is known; in the 13th century, the Saint Alban's Abbey in Mainz may have held the lordship over Sörgenloch.

=== Name’s origin ===
The name Sörgenloch developed out of the form Saligenloh, which itself goes back to Roman times, being a combination of the Latin salix (“willow”) and the archaic German word Loh (“wood”), and therefore, the name means “Willowwood”.

The following forms of the name were current at various times in the past:

- Sulegloch (1190)
- Surgenloch (1200)
- Sulgeloch and Sorgenloch (1293)
- Selgenloch (1432)

=== Early times ===
In 1880 an iron axe and two pots were found that came from the Iron Age, leading to the conclusion that Celts had then already settled in what is now Sörgenloch. Moreover, remnants of a Vangionic settlement were found.

In the 19th century, while the vineyards were being cleared, several coins and grave finds from Roman times were unearthed. These finds are kept in the Wormser Museum. Even the rural cadastral name Hundertmorgen refers to Roman settlement, as 100 Morgen was the amount of land that a Roman soldier was awarded once he completed his service.

Sörgenloch belonged to the original Frankish territory – or Urmark – of Olm. As settlements formed around estates, where stood churches, the centres of Ober-Olm, Nieder-Olm, Klein-Winternheim and Sörgenloch came into being in Olm. As municipal limits and fortifications, these places were given earthen walls, strengthened with hedges. Cadastral names such as Oberheck (Hecke means “hedge” in German) and Im Bock (“bend in a hedge”) recall this time. Nearby, above Sörgenloch, a grave field from this time (6th and 7th century) was found.

== Religion ==
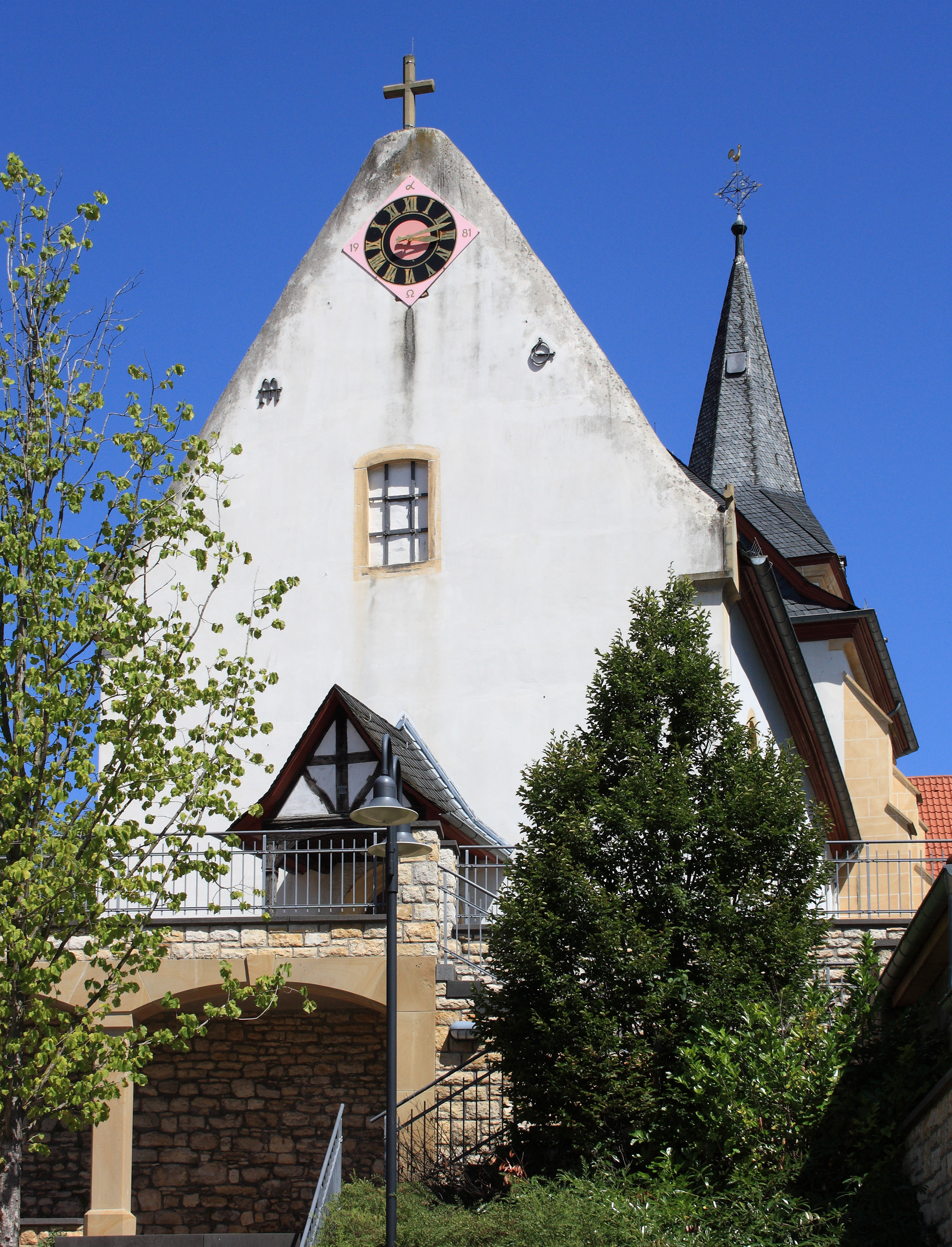
Mariä Opferung church, Sörgenloch

Sörgenloch is a pilgrimage site. The inhabitants are overwhelmingly Roman Catholic.

=== Pilgrimage ===
Sörgenloch observes on 8 September – the Nativity of Mary – a pilgrimage.

During the Nine Years' War in the 17th century, the Sörgenloch villagers had to leave the village and hide themselves in the surrounding countryside. To safeguard the gotic Madonna statue (~1420), they buried it outside the village. Once the war ended, nobody could remember the exact spot where the statue had been buried. The villagers prayed to God to reveal to them the spot. There was an apparition over a meadow near the Selz and right there, the statue was found buried. Ever since, at the Nativity of Mary, a pilgrimage has been observed.

On the Sunday after 8 September, tribute is paid to Mary with a church service and a procession through Sörgenloch, and the Madonna statue is borne through the streets.

== Politics ==
=== Municipal council ===
- FWG - 6 seats
- SPD - 6 seats
- CDU - 4 seats

=== Mayor ===
The mayor of Sörgenloch is Bernd Simon (FWG). He was elected in May 2019.

=== Town partnerships ===
- Ludes, Marne, France

=== Coat of arms ===
The municipality's arms might be described thus: Argent, in base a mount of three issuant therefrom a grapevine vert, bearing each side a bunch of grapes azure, and on each of three upper stalks a cross bottonnée gules, the dexter in bend, the middle in pale and the sinister in bend sinister.

These arms are based on the municipality's third seal, from 1714. The vine is the Vine of Christ (John 15:1). Earlier seals had shown only the vine, a symbol for the area's widespread winegrowing.

It is unknown when the arms were conferred or adopted.

== Culture and sightseeing ==
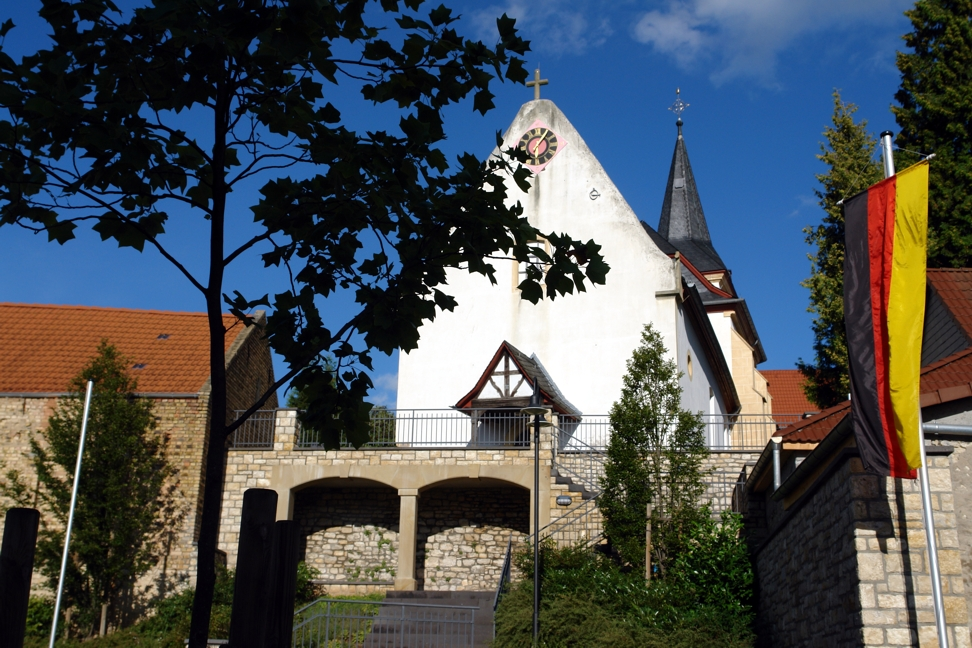
Sörgenloch Catholic Parish Church

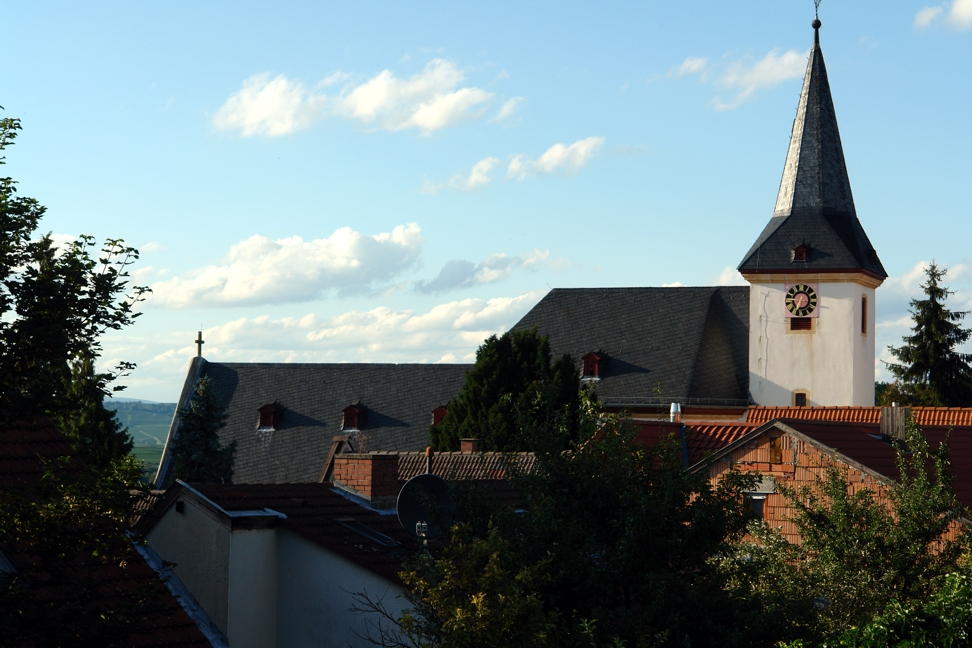
Sörgenloch Catholic Parish Church

=== Buildings ===
- The Catholic Parish Church has dominated the municipality's skyline since the 13th century. Its current appearance it got in a reconstruction after a fire in the 17th century. The Baroque comes from the 18th century. The Parish Church houses the Sörgenloch Madonna, a Late Gothic work.
- On the eastern edge of the old village core is found the Sörgenlocher Schloss. The small Renaissance residence was built by the local Sörgenloch lords, the family von Köth-Wanscheid, in the latter half of the 18th century. Today it is run under the name Schloß Sörgenloch as a restaurant.
- The old Jewish graveyard lies in the municipality's northeast. It was formerly also used by surrounding municipalities. Today, though, only four gravestones are preserved.

=== Folk music ===
Sörgenloch is a centre of the Rhenish-Hessian folk music scene. Many well known groups rehearse there, or recruit musicians from the village.

- Wild-Rovers
- Goo Birds Flight
- Ilwetritsch
- An Thor

== Economy and infrastructure ==
The municipality of Sörgenloch was until the last decade overwhelmingly agriculture-based. It is today a modern residential community on the edge of the urban agglomeration of the Frankfurt Rhine Main Region.

In agriculture, fruit growing and winegrowing predominate. The Sörgenloch wine region Moosberg has some 39 ha under cultivation.

=== Transport ===
Sörgenloch lies on the L 432 state road, over which the A 63 autobahn can be reached in a few minutes.

A bus link towards Nieder-Olm/Mainz exists in the form of the ORN (Omnibusverkehr Rhein-Nahe GmbH) route 652.

The nearest railway station is found in neighbouring Nieder-Olm.
