= Stadecken-Elsheim =

- Municipality
- Coat of arms

- Location of Stadecken-Elsheim within Mainz-Bingen district
- Interactive map of Stadecken-Elsheim
- Location within Germany Location within Rhineland-Palatinate
- Coordinates: 49°54′43″N 8°07′31″E
- Country: Germany
- State: Rhineland-Palatinate
- District: Mainz-Bingen
- Municipal assoc.: Nieder-Olm
- Subdivisions: 2

Government
  - Mayor (2019–24): Thomas Barth (CDU)

Area
  - Total: 14.52 km^{2} (5.61 sq mi)
- Elevation: 147 m (482 ft)

Population (2025-12-31)
  - Total: 4,860
  - Density: 335/km^{2} (867/sq mi)
- Time zone: UTC+01:00 (CET)
  - Summer (DST): UTC+02:00 (CEST)
- Postal codes: 55271
- Dialling codes: 06130 (Elsheim), 06136 (Stadecken)
- Vehicle registration: MZ
- Website: www.Stadecken-Elsheim.de

Stadecken-Elsheim is an Ortsgemeinde – a municipality belonging to a Verbandsgemeinde, a kind of collective municipality – in the Mainz-Bingen district in Rhineland-Palatinate, Germany.

== Geography ==
=== Location ===
Stadecken-Elsheim lies just under 15 kilometres (9.3 mi) (as the crow flies) southwest of the state capital of Mainz in the middle of the wine region of Rhenish Hesse on both sides of the Selz. It belongs to the Verbandsgemeinde of Nieder-Olm, whose seat is in the like-named town.

=== Neighbouring municipalities ===
Stadecken-Elsheim borders in the west on Jugenheim, in the northeast on Essenheim, in the east on Nieder-Olm (all likewise in the Verbandsgemeinde of Nieder-Olm), in the northwest on Schwabenheim (Verbandsgemeinde of Gau-Algesheim) and in the south on Saulheim (Verbandsgemeinde of Wörrstadt in Alzey-Worms).

== History ==
Stadecken-Elsheim is a municipality made up of the two formerly self-administering municipalities of Stadecken and Elsheim on 7 June 1969. The newly created double municipality was supposed to be given the coined name “Sonnenberg”. This suggestion was, however, rejected. Named first in today's double-barrelled name is Stadecken, for its greater size.

Given that the municipality was formerly two separate ones, there is no common history that can be told about Stadecken-Elsheim. Therefore, to have a clear, comprehensive picture of the whole municipality's history, one needs to consider each centre's history separately.

=== Stadecken’s history ===
The constituent community of Stadecken gets its name, which is unusual for the region, from the moated castle of Stadeck, which had its first documentary mention as Eckburg am Gestade in 1276. The castle with its surrounding hamlet stood for centuries as an administrative hub and lordly headquarters with winegrowing that had great importance to the surrounding villages.

In the 13th century, the mighty dynastic family of the County of Katzenelnbogen, who also ruled Darmstadt, Sankt Goar and parts of the Taunus, managed to get a foothold in the Gau when in 1291, as Vögte they began overseeing three parish churches’ worldly welfare in Hedesheim, Engelstadt, and Ockenheim for their owner, Sankt Andres zu Köln (monastery). In 1291 Count Eberhart built Stadeck Castle with a moat on the territory of Hedesheim for the area's security. He soon brought settlers into his castle's protection and acquired for his castle hamlet in 1301 town rights from Emperor Albrecht. Hedesheim, the old village from the 7th century, was forsaken, and nowadays exists only in the cadastral name Im Altdorf (“In the Old Village”). Although the Count's efforts to enlarge the castle hamlet of Stadeck never bore any fruit, his castle stood as an important barrier against further encroachment by Electoral Mainz and became an important centre for securing his power base.

In 1468, Count Phillip of Katzenelnbogen, before his family died out, endowed his granddaughter Ottilie with Stadeck when she wed the Margrave Christoph I of Baden so that it could later serve as a widow's seat for the Margravine.

In 1507 the Baden Dynasty sold the Stadeck lordship to the Knights of Quad-Wickrath. This intermediate period, though, only lasted until 1564, when Wolfgang von Zweibrücken bought the Amt, castle and village for 32,000 Gulden. The Counts Palatine had the now newly formed Amt consisting of Stadeck, Essenheim and great holdings in Elsheim's land area run by Amtsmänner, who lived at Stadeck Castle together with the clergyman, the schoolteacher and four servants. Stadeck Castle can be seen in Zweibrücken's time as a fortified administrative and financial office. At this time, the village's population was roughly 350, and these people, along with those from Essenheimern, were obliged to do compulsory labour. The village had self-administration then under the Schultheiß (roughly “reeve”) and the five councilmen. They formed the Stadeck court.

In April 1632, in battle between Spaniards and Swedes, the castle and the greater part of the village were destroyed. In the great devastation in the Palatinate, Stadecken suffered further damage. In 1733 the Amt of Stadeck (Stadecken and Essenheim) passed at the settlement of succession questions to Electoral Palatinate. It was made part of the Oberamt of Oppenheim. The lordly officials assigned to this the family of officials, Hecht, who were from Kreuznach. In the time of French rule from 1797 to 1813, Stadecken belonged to the department of Donnersberg and the canton of Nieder-Olm. In 1816, the Amt and the village passed to the Grand Duchy of Hesse.

Even in National Socialist times, Stadecken had special functions. The local NSDAP group, which in the rural municipality of Stadecken came into being as early as the beginning of April 1929 through wine dealer Moritz Cramer's efforts, stood as a base for the spread of the party in the northern area of the region of Rhenish Hesse.

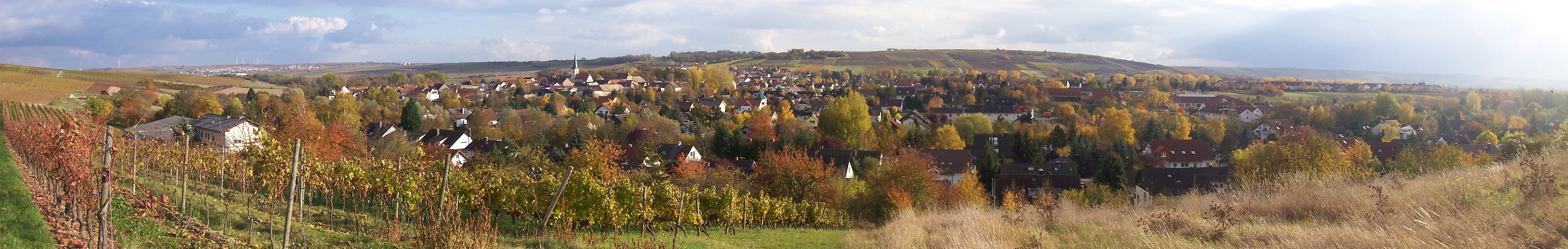
Panorama of Stadecken

=== Elsheim’s history ===
Elsheim has a past no less rich in tradition. Its roots reach back, much as Stadecken's “forerunner village” Hedesheim's do, to Frankish times. Elsheim had its first documentary mention in 1144 as Ilgesheim. Elsheim, unlike Stadecken, belonged for centuries to the Imperial Villages (that is, those with Imperial immediacy) of the Ingelheimer Grund. This was pledged in 1375 to the Count Palatine and was taken over by him for good as an Imperial pledge in 1407, and thus it remained until the late 18th century. Given that they lived in the Imperial Territory, the Elsheim townsmen enjoyed the same rights and were subject to the same duties as townsmen in Imperial Cities. Even Elsheim, though, had to take its share of destruction in the Thirty Years' War, but it continued, despite the ensuing years of hunger. Better times brought the economy to life. The street network was expanded, a fact still commemorated today by the Ehrensäule (“Column of Honour”).

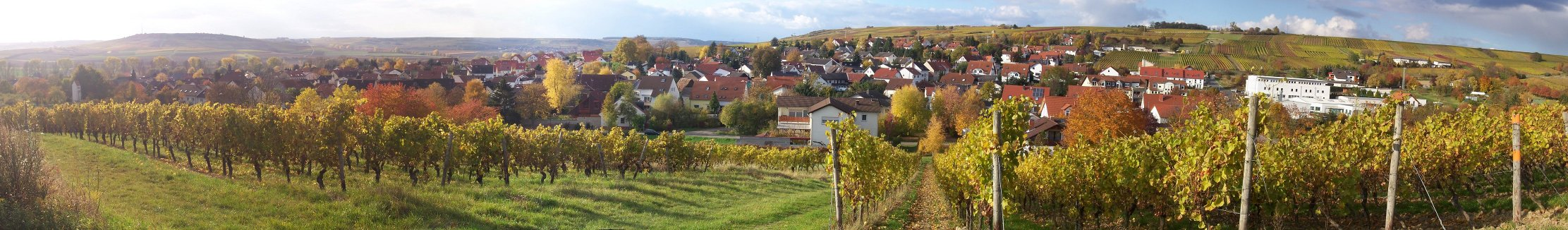
Panorama of Elsheim

== Politics ==
=== Mayor ===
Mayor of Stadecken-Elsheim is Thomas Barth (CDU). He was elected the first time in 2014, and was reelected in June 2019.

=== Town partnerships ===
- Rupt-sur-Moselle, Vosges, France since 1980
- (Germany) Wilbich, Eichsfeld district, Thuringia since 1990
- (Germany) Ershausen, Eichsfeld district, Thuringia since 1990
- Bovolone, Province of Verona, Veneto, Italy since 2000

== Culture and sightseeing ==
=== Winegrowing ===
Owing to the high-grade soil and the mild climate in the Rhine valley, winegrowing here looks back on a long tradition. The municipality is therefore characterized by winegrowing, and today, with its Stadecker Spitzberg, Stadecker Lenchen, Elsheimer Blume and Elsheimer Bockstein vineyards on the Mainzer Berg (mountain) it is one of Rhenish Hesse's biggest winegrowing centres. The typical grape variety is Silvaner, but Müller-Thurgau, Riesling, Blauer Portugieser and further various Burgundy varieties are widely grown. A great deal of the Qualitätsweine made here are marketed by the local winemakers themselves. Especially in the autumn, at grape harvesting time, visitors are drawn by the many Straußwirtschaften.

=== Buildings ===
- Stadeck Castle

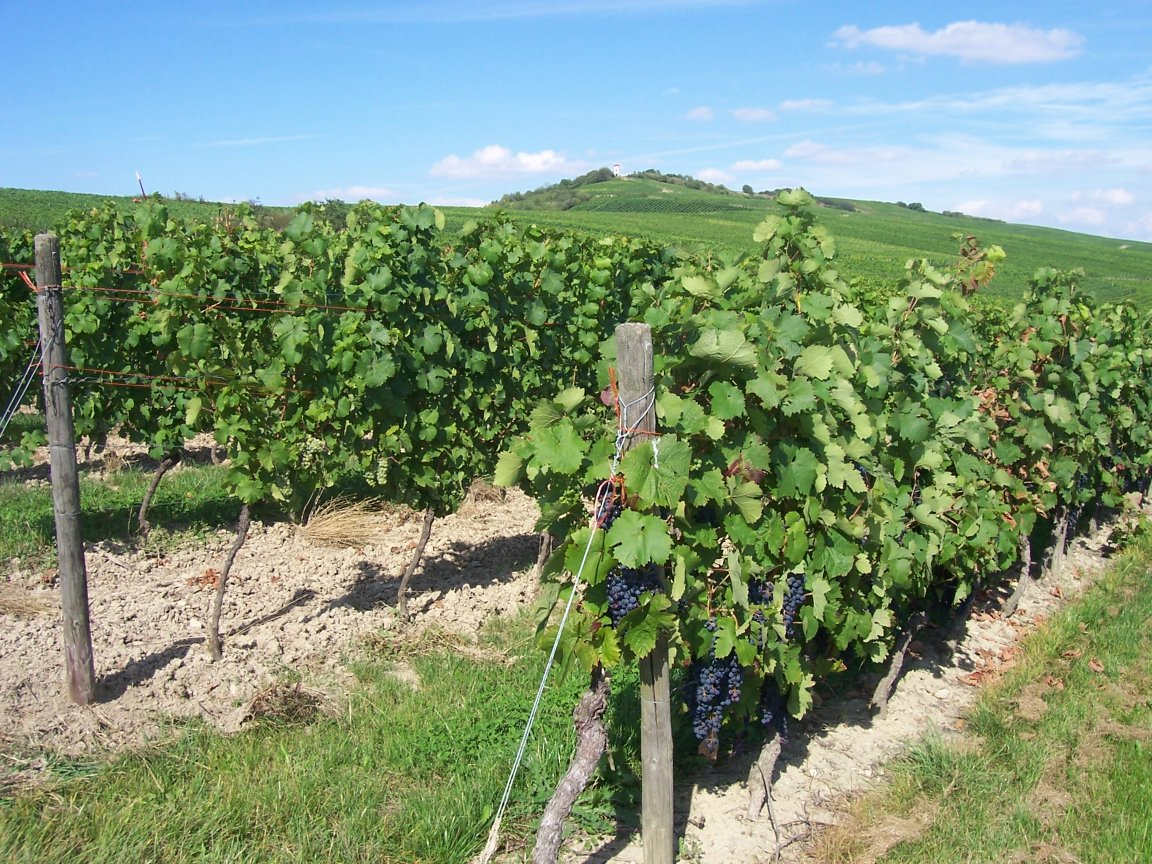
Vineyards above Elsheim

== Economy and infrastructure ==
=== Transport ===
The municipality lies five kilometres away from Autobahn A 63 at the intersection with highways 413, 426 and 428. Stadecken-Elsheim lies within the area served by the Rhein-Nahe-Nahverkehrsverbund (RNN) and is served by buses of the Omnibusverkehr Rhein-Nahe (ORN) and the Mainzer Verkehrsgesellschaft (MVG) which afford the local transport links to Rhenish Hesse's outlying areas and to Mainz, and also to the Rhein-Main-Verkehrsverbund (RMV).

== Famous people ==
- Friedrich Axt (1870–1947), Member of the Diet of the People's State of Hesse (Landtag des Volksstaates Hessen, born in Elsheim.
