= Ober-Olm =

- Municipality
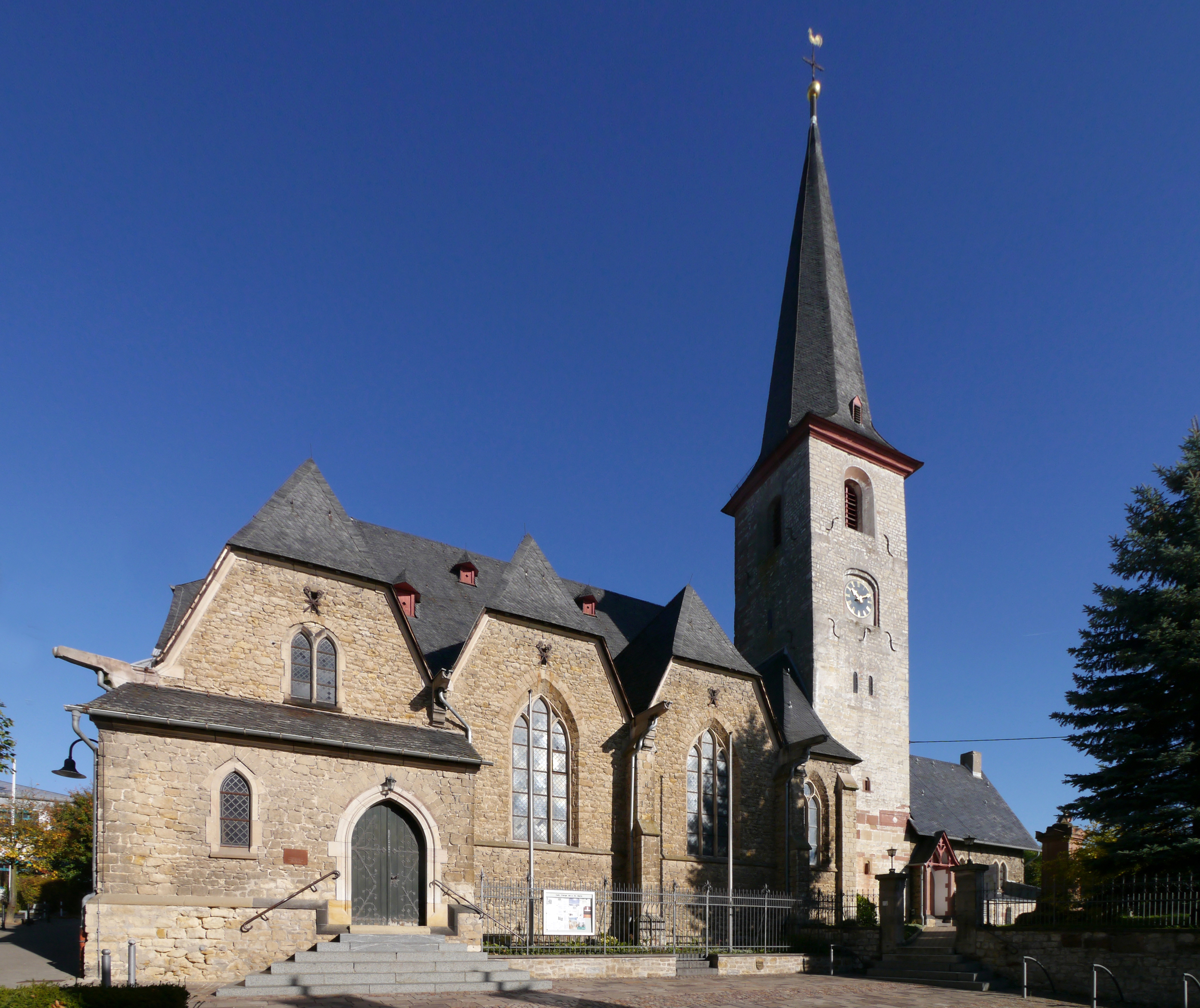
- Church of Saint Martin

- Coat of arms

- Location of Ober-Olm within Mainz-Bingen district
- Interactive map of Ober-Olm
- Location within Germany Location within Rhineland-Palatinate
- Coordinates: 49°56′13″N 08°11′20″E
- Country: Germany
- State: Rhineland-Palatinate
- District: Mainz-Bingen
- Municipal assoc.: Nieder-Olm

Government
  - Mayor (2024–29): Matthias Becker (CDU)

Area
  - Total: 17.08 km^{2} (6.59 sq mi)
- Elevation: 151 m (495 ft)

Population (2025-12-31)
  - Total: 4,532
  - Density: 265.3/km^{2} (687.2/sq mi)
- Time zone: UTC+01:00 (CET)
  - Summer (DST): UTC+02:00 (CEST)
- Postal codes: 55270
- Dialling codes: 06136
- Vehicle registration: MZ
- Website: www.ober-olm.de

Ober-Olm (German pronunciation: [ˈoːbɐ ʔɔlm], lit. 'Upper Olm', in contrast to "Lower Olm") is an Ortsgemeinde – a municipality belonging to a Verbandsgemeinde, a kind of collective municipality – in the Mainz-Bingen district in Rhineland-Palatinate, Germany.

== Geography ==
=== Neighbouring municipalities ===
Ober-Olm's neighbours are Mainz-Layenhof, Mainz-Finthen, Mainz-Drais, Mainz-Lerchenberg, Mainz-Bretzenheim, Mainz-Marienborn, Klein-Winternheim, Mainz-Ebersheim, Nieder-Olm, and Essenheim.

== History ==
Finds in the municipal area have yielded the first clues to settlers here in the 4th century BC. In AD 97, the former consul Vejento had a temple built for the forest goddess Nemetona near his Klein-Winternheim landholding, a richly furnished Roman settlement in the Ober-Olm cadastral area of Villenkeller. Ober-Olm itself arose in the 6th century as a Frankish establishment and had its first documentary mention in 994. The name “Ulmena Superior” from 1190 was formerly associated with elm trees, Ulme being the Modern High German word for this tree; however, this word was not borrowed into German from Latin (ulmus) until the 12th century. The formation of the placename Ulm and an ending —ena is typical for a brook's name, and these were often also used as placenames. It can be assumed that Ulmena was the name that the Germanic settlers between Ober-Olm and Nieder-Olm gave the Selz. The few Roman people left still used the name Salusia for the brook, which was the name that eventually stuck to it. Ulmena, however, remained as well, and clove to both the centres now bearing Olm as part of their names.

In 1582, 1603 and 1857, Ober-Olm was destroyed by devastating fires.

=== World War II ===
German antisemitism under the Nazis became increasingly difficult in the years prior to World War II. Jews had lived in Ober-olm and surrounding small towns for hundreds of years, from at least the time of the Middle Ages. Jewish residents were well-integrated into the life and commerce of these towns. For a brief time, antisemitic laws were less rigorously enforced in Obel-olm than in neighboring large cities such as Mainz and Frankfurt. During those years, a few Jewish residents of these cities sent their children to live with "country cousins" in Ober-olm, hoping that their children would be able to continue to attend school and live undisturbed. But as antisemitic laws became more harsh. For example, when Jews were no longer permitted to have checking accounts to conduct business, Jewish residents were not able to make a living and suffered greatly.

Some Jewish residents of Ober-olm were fortunate to be able to obtain visas for the United States and were able to emigrate to safety. Others were not so fortunate, and perished as a result.

During the Western Allied invasion of Germany in April 1945, the nearby Luftwaffe Mainz-Finthen airfield was seized by the United States Third Army, and used by the USAAF 354th Fighter Group which flew P-47 Thunderbolts from the aerodrome, designated ALG Y-64, from 8 to 30 April 1945. Acquired for use by the United States Army after the conclusion of the war, the former German Luftwaffe fighter base was named Finthen Army Airfield and has been used by Army aviation units ever since.

Since 1972, Ober-Olm has belonged to the Verbandsgemeinde of Nieder-Olm, whose seat is in the like-named town.

Many ecclesiastical and monastic institutions had landholdings in the municipality, including, for example, Eberbach Abbey, the Maria Dalheim monasteries in Mainz, the Dominicans and the Carthusians, the White Ladies, an order of nuns devoted to Mary Magdalene, in Mainz and All Hallows’ Monastery in Wesel. Furthermore, the Cathedral Chapter in Mainz, the Ravengiersburg Monastery, Saint John's Church in Mainz, Saint Stephen's Church in Mainz, Mariengreden, Saint Victor's and Saint Peter's were all landholders.

=== 21st century ===
In 2003, the German-Pennsylvanian Association was founded in Ober-Olm. It's also the village, where the German-Pennsylvanian newspaper Hiwwe wie Driwwe is published by the German-Pennsylvanian Archive in cooperation with the Pennsylvania German Cultural Heritage Center at Kutztown University of Pennsylvania in Kutztown, Pennsylvania.

== Politics ==
=== Town council ===
The council is made up of 20 elected council members, in addition to the unsalaried, directly elected mayor. The mayor has voting rights just like the other council members. The seats divided by party membership:

| | SPD | CDU | FWG | FDP | Greens | Total |
| 2019 | 4 | 8 | 3 | 1 | 4 | 20 seats |

(as per municipal election held on 26 May 2019)

=== Town partnerships ===
- Ramonchamp, Vosges, France
- (Germany) Schloßvippach, Sömmerda district, Thuringia

There are also friendship arrangements with the following places:

- Bobrowice, Lubusz Voivodeship, Poland
- (Germany) Bruck in der Oberpfalz, Schwandorf district, Bavaria
- (Germany) Seebach, Ortenaukreis, Baden-Württemberg
- (Germany) Seiffen, Erzgebirgskreis, Saxony
- Wolfsegg am Hausruck, Upper Austria, Austria

== Sightseeing ==
- Saint Martin's Church (Martinskirche) with a tower from Carolingian times and a statue of Saint Urban from the 16th century.
- Hunting lodge of the Electors of Mainz (Altes Forsthaus) from 1764.
- Ober-Olmer Wald (forest), a 335-hectare recreation area.
- Saint Valentine's Chapel (Valentinskapelle) with its Rococo altar, which stands picturesquely on the edge of the vineyards.
- The 650-year-old elm tree had to be cut down in 1985 after it fell victim to Dutch elm disease.
- Renovated Town Hall from 1550, floors added in 1721-1722.

== Economy and infrastructure ==
=== Transport ===
- The Autobahn A 63 lies approximately 3 km away.
- The Deutsche Bahn railway station Klein-Winternheim/Ober-Olm on the Alzey–Mainz railway is found in neighbouring Klein-Winternheim.
- City bus link to Mainz as far as Hochheim (route 68) and ORN bus links (regional route 650) to outlying areas in Rhenish Hesse as well as into the city of Mainz in the evening and back until after midnight.

=== Telecommunications ===
The Ober-Olm Transmission Tower (Fernmeldeturm Ober-Olm) was built as a 70.35 m-tall tower for Deutsche Telekom in 1966. Its nicknames include “Olmi”, “Ober-Olmer Spargel” (Spargel means “asparagus” in German) and “Fernsehturm” (“Television Tower”). It stands at 49°56′31″N 8°10′16″E. In 1990, the transmission tower had another 38 m built onto the top, bringing its current height to 108.35 m.

=== Public Institutions ===
- Ulmenhalle, a multi-purpose hall at Essenheimer Straße 17a
- Sport facility with artificial-turf football pitch and competition-standard athletic facility, Am Sportplatz (location)
- Kindergarten Abenteuerland (“Kindergarten Adventureland”), Pfannenstiel 36
- Kindertagesstätte St. Elisabeth (daycare centre), Essenheimer Straße 17

=== Education ===
- Grundschule Ober-Olm (primary school), Schulstraße, sponsor: Verbandsgemeinde Nieder-Olm
- Kreisvolkshochschule (KVHS, district folk high school), Ober-Olm branch, Schulstraße 2

== People ==
- Margit Sponheimer
- Dr. Michael Werner (Publisher)

=== Honorary citizens ===
- Franz Nikolaus Becker
- Father Henri Thiebaut, Ramonchamp
