= Schwabenheim an der Selz =

- Municipality
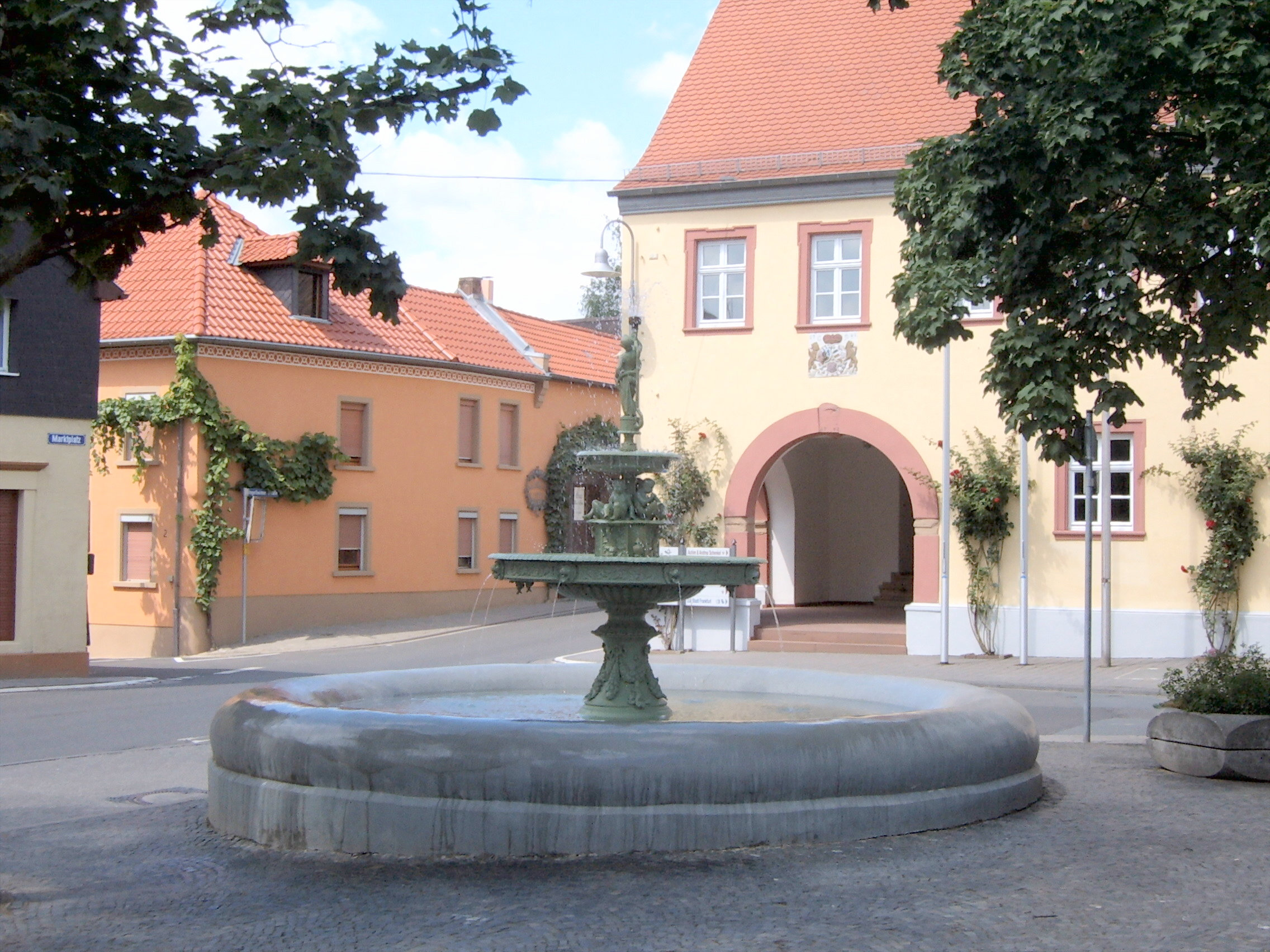
- Town square

- Coat of arms

- Location of Schwabenheim an der Selz within Mainz-Bingen district
- Interactive map of Schwabenheim an der Selz
- Location within Germany Location within Rhineland-Palatinate
- Coordinates: 49°55′58″N 8°5′39″E
- Country: Germany
- State: Rhineland-Palatinate
- District: Mainz-Bingen
- Municipal assoc.: Gau-Algesheim

Government
  - Mayor (2019–24): Frank Heinrich (CDU)

Area
  - Total: 9.49 km^{2} (3.66 sq mi)
- Elevation: 140 m (460 ft)

Population (2025-12-31)
  - Total: 2,425
  - Density: 256/km^{2} (662/sq mi)
- Time zone: UTC+01:00 (CET)
  - Summer (DST): UTC+02:00 (CEST)
- Postal codes: 55270
- Dialling codes: 06130
- Vehicle registration: MZ
- Website: www.schwabenheim.de

Schwabenheim an der Selz is an Ortsgemeinde – a municipality belonging to a Verbandsgemeinde, a kind of collective municipality – in the Mainz-Bingen district in Rhineland-Palatinate, Germany.

== Geography ==
=== Location ===
The municipality lies in the north of Rhenish Hesse, south of Ingelheim on the east bank of the Selz.

=== Neighbouring municipalities ===
Clockwise from the north, these are Ingelheim am Rhein with its outlying centres of Großwinternheim and Wackernheim, Stadecken-Elsheim in the Verbandsgemeinde of Nieder-Olm and Bubenheim in the Verbandsgemeinde of Gau-Algesheim.

== History ==
766	Schwabenheim had its first documentary mention in 766 as Suaboheim in the Lorsch Annals. Moreover, a Suaboheim in the Wormsgau (a mediaeval Worms-based county) crops up in documents from Fulda, although it is unclear whether it means this Schwabenheim or the Pfaffen-Schwabenheim in the Verbandsgemeinde of Bad Kreuznach.
962	Emperor Otto I confirmed Saint Maximin's Abbey's (near Trier) rights and holdings in various places in Rhenish Hesse, among them Suaveheim.
1280	Schwabenheim was mentioned by Emperor Rudolph of Habsburg.
1305	Louis the Bavarian pledged the village to the Archbishop of Mainz.
1367	For a loan of 11,000 Gulden the village was pledged to the Electorate of the Palatinate to finance a trip to Rome.
1375	Through pledges the village had many owners, such as the Archbishopric of Mainz, the City of Mainz and finally, beginning in 1375, the Elector of the Palatinate. The placing under the Emperor's immediate power, which was greatly desired, can still be seen today in the coat of arms, which bears as a charge the two-headed Imperial Eagle. Schwabenheim was only formally admitted to the circle of Imperial villages, which were not subject to serfdom or compulsory labour and which enjoyed free hunting and fishing, in 1443.
1507	The village passed after repeated pledgings and redemptions at last to the Electorate of the Palatinate, Oberamt of Oppenheim, with which it stayed until the French Revolution.
1556	Supported by the Electors of the Palatinate, the Reformation was also introduced into Schwabenheim in 1556. Thereafter the parish changed its denominational allegiance nine times, being led at various times by Lutheran, Reformed or Catholic clergymen until in 1705, through the great “Palatine Church Division”, it was split between the Catholic and Reformed churches.
1693	The Benedictine monks at St. Maximin's Abbey in Trier took over pastoral care in the parish of Schwabenheim themselves in 1693 and led it until 1708 from the provost's residence. The Thirty Years' War left in its wake in Schwabenheim, as elsewhere, its dreadful aftermath.
1796	A sharp turn in the local history came when the French Revolutionary army thronged into the land. After a first occupation in 1792, the market town of Schwabenheim suffered a destructive blow in 1796 when the place was set afire. Until 1815, Schwabenheim lay under French administration. In this time also came Schwabenheim's first industry, a sugar factory, although this – along with the vinegar factory established in 1880, a glass factory and a gum and celluloid factory – was shut down later. The population's occupational makeup is today mixed. Besides the farmers and winegrowers, there is a great number of workers who commute to jobs at surrounding industrial works to earn their living.
1904 – 1955	During this time, the Selztalbahn (railway) was run by the South German Railway Company (Süddeutsche Eisenbahn-Gesellschaft). In colloquial speech, this was sometimes called Zuckerlottche or Luische for the cargo that it so often hauled – sugar beets.
1921	The Schwabenheim synagogue at Bachstrasse 4 was sold and the Jewish community was dissolved.

== Origin of the name Schwabenheim ==
- 11th century: From this time come documents that are known to refer to Schwabenheim. From this time forth, the place has been mentioned by the following names:
- 1023 – Suabheim
- 1051 – Suaveheim
- 1140 – Suapeheim
- 1200 – Suosabenheim
- 1328 – Suabeheim
- 1339 – Schwabeheim
- 1424 – Schwabneheim
- 1502 – Surschwabenheim, Sauerschwabenheim
- 1904 – Beginning in this year, the place is called Schwabenheim an der Selz.

In terms of sovereignty, Schwabenheim belonged as an Imperial Village with Imperial immediacy to the Ingelheimer Grund

=== Court ===
As part of the Ingelheimer Grund, Schwabenheim had its own local court on which sat the Ortsschultheiß (roughly “reeve”) and eight Schöffen (roughly “lay jurists”).

== Politics ==
=== Coat of arms ===

The municipality's arms might be described thus: Per pale Or and sable a double-headed Imperial Eagle displayed counterchanged armed, beaked and langued gules. The double-headed eagle motif seen in today's arms goes back to a 15th-century court seal and a municipal seal from 1531. Both these seals showed a one-headed eagle, however. The eagle stood for Schwabenheim's – then still known as Sauer-Schwabenheim – membership among the Imperial Villages of the Ingelheimer Grund that passed in 1407 to the Electorate of the Palatinate. From 1761, the double-headed Imperial Eagle is seen in the seal. Given that the Grand Duchy of Hesse took over Schwabenheim in 1816, and that the National Socialists seized power in 1933, Schwabenheim's arms have been changed a few times. After the Second World War, the municipality bore the old Electorate of the Palatinate arms. This escutcheon, however, satisfied nobody. The unanimous opinion was that the Imperial Eagle belonged back in the arms. At two Wiesbaden state archive councillors’ suggestion in 1983, arms that were party per pale (that is, split down the middle), gold on the dexter (armsbearer's right, viewer's left) side and black on the sinister (armsbearer's left, viewer's right) side with the double-headed Imperial Eagle “counterchanged” (that is, on each side taking the tincture of the field on the other side; this is called in verwechselten Farben – in changed colours – in German) were put forth for approval and later the same year, the approval was granted.

==== Former coats of arms ====
The municipality's oldest coat of arms bore an Imperial Eagle on a golden field. In 1742, this was replaced with the arms borne by Elector Karl Philipp of the Palatinate. The double-headed Imperial Eagle is witnessed in the municipal seal beginning in 1761.

=== Town partnerships ===
- Chambolle-Musigny, Côte-d'Or, France since 1966
- (Germany) Schmerbach, Gotha district, Thuringia since 1991
- Minerbe, Province of Verona, Veneto, Italy since 2001

== Culture and sightseeing ==
=== Natural monuments ===
Northeast of the village of Schwabenheim is a hiking loop through the Pfauengrund protected area.

=== Gastronomy ===
Long established inns can be found in the lordly estates from the 18th century around the marketplace with its market fountain.

=== Buildings ===
Furthermore, Schwabenheim has other things worth seeing, like the Irish-Scottish Church with its Carolingian lintel and Viergötterstein, the former provost's residence from the 17th century and the Town Hall built in 1742.

=== Regular events ===
- On the last weekend in August is the Backesgassefest (“Bakehouse Lane Festival”) on Backhausstrasse.
- On the third weekend in September is the Schwabenheimer Markt at the marketplace.
- On the first weekend in Advent is the Christmas Market at the marketplace.

== Economy and infrastructure ==
Schwabenheim is strongly characterized by agriculture. Dominating this field, as it does throughout Rhenish Hesse, is winegrowing with a cultivated vineyard area of 180 ha. In the Kaiserpfalz wine region, the municipality has a share of the Klostergarten, Schlossberg and Sonnenberg vineyards.

Some 25 companies marketing bottled wine make wine of all quality classifications. Besides the standard varieties Silvaner and Müller-Thurgau, newer varieties such as Scheurebe, Faberrebe, Bacchus and Kerner, among others, are grown. Red wine, too – Blauer Portugieser and Pinot noir – is made. Crops of almost all kinds of pomaceous and stone fruits and asparagus make up the hills in this region.

On the old monastery grounds, Intervet Innovation GmbH, a daughter company of Schering-Plough, has established itself. Intervet runs a global research and development centre there for veterinary products with the emphasis on antibiotics and antiparasitics employing 230 workers in Schwabenheim.

=== Transport ===
The municipality is crossed by Landesstraße (state road) 428. The A 60 and A 63 autobahns can be reached by car in 10 to 20 minutes.

== Famous people ==
=== Sons and daughters of the town ===
- Anspach family
- Simone Renth, 1998/1999 Rhenish-Hessian Wine Queen, and also a year later: 1999/2000 51st German Wine Queen.
