= Holzamer =

Holzamer is a surname. Notable people with the surname include:

- Karl Holzamer (1906–2007), German philosopher
- Wilhelm Holzamer (1870–1907), German novelist

== See also ==
- Holzemer
