= Masters W75 long jump world record progression =

This is the progression of world record improvements of the long jump W75 division of Masters athletics.

Key

Incomplete information Pending

Distance	Wind	Athlete	Nationality	Birthdate	Location	Date
3.85	-0.5	Carol LaFayette-Boyd	Canada	17.05.1942	Regina	10.06.2017
3.77	0.0	Paula Schneiderhan	Germany	16.11.1921	Nieder-Olm	04.10.1997
3.22		Johanna Gelbrich	Germany	19.01.1913	Leverkusen	14.05.1988
