= Holzemer =

Holzemer is a surname. Notable people with the surname include:

- James Holzemer (born 1935), American politician
- Mark Holzemer (born 1969), American baseball player

== See also ==
- Holzamer
