= Jugenheim in Rheinhessen =

- Municipality
- Coat of arms

- Location of Jugenheim in Rheinhessen within Mainz-Bingen district
- Interactive map of Jugenheim in Rheinhessen
- Location within Germany Location within Rhineland-Palatinate
- Coordinates: 49°53′42″N 8°05′06″E
- Country: Germany
- State: Rhineland-Palatinate
- District: Mainz-Bingen
- Municipal assoc.: Nieder-Olm

Government
  - Mayor (2019–24): Herbert Petri (SPD)

Area
  - Total: 6.17 km^{2} (2.38 sq mi)
- Elevation: 156 m (512 ft)

Population (2025-12-31)
  - Total: 1,656
  - Density: 268/km^{2} (695/sq mi)
- Time zone: UTC+01:00 (CET)
  - Summer (DST): UTC+02:00 (CEST)
- Postal codes: 55270
- Dialling codes: 06130
- Vehicle registration: MZ
- Website: www.jugenheim-rheinhessen.de

Jugenheim in Rheinhessen is an Ortsgemeinde – a municipality belonging to a Verbandsgemeinde, a kind of collective municipality – in the Mainz-Bingen district in Rhineland-Palatinate, Germany.

== Geography ==
=== Location ===
Jugenheim lies in the middle among Mainz, Bingen, Alzey and Bad Kreuznach in Rhenish Hesse. The winegrowing centre belongs to the Verbandsgemeinde of Nieder-Olm, whose seat is in the like-named town.

== History ==
In 767, Jugenheim had its first documentary mention as Gaginheim. Since 1987, Jugenheim has been a recognized village renewal municipality (Dorferneuerungsgemeinde).

The synagogue in Jugenheim was burned on Kristallnacht but the Torah scroll was rescued from the burning building and later smuggled to the United States. It is now held by Temple B'nai Israel in Oklahoma City.

== Politics ==
=== Town council ===
The council is made up of 17 council members, counting the part-time mayor, with seats apportioned thus:

	SPD	FWG	CDU	Total
2004	9	5	2	16 seats

(as at municipal election held on 13 June 2004)

=== Town partnerships ===
- Oberhoffen-sur-Moder, Bas-Rhin, France

=== Coat of arms ===
The municipality's arms might be described thus: Azure semy of crosses argent a lion rampant of the second armed, langued and crowned gules.

== Culture and sightseeing ==
=== Buildings ===
Saint Martin's Church (Martinskirche, Evangelical) was consecrated in 1775 and with seating for 1,000 worshippers is one of Rhenish Hesse's biggest churches. Its Wegmann organ from 1762 together with the original organ balustrade comes from the old Welschnonnenkirche – once a convent church, now no longer standing – in Mainz.

=== Sport ===
- Three outdoor tennis courts
- The tennis hall built in 1999 with two courts
- Sport complex with natural-grass field
- Riding square with riding hall
- Beach volleyball field (built in 2005)
- Boule lane
- Jugenheim's football club is TuS 1899 Jugenheim.
