= Zornheim =

- Municipality
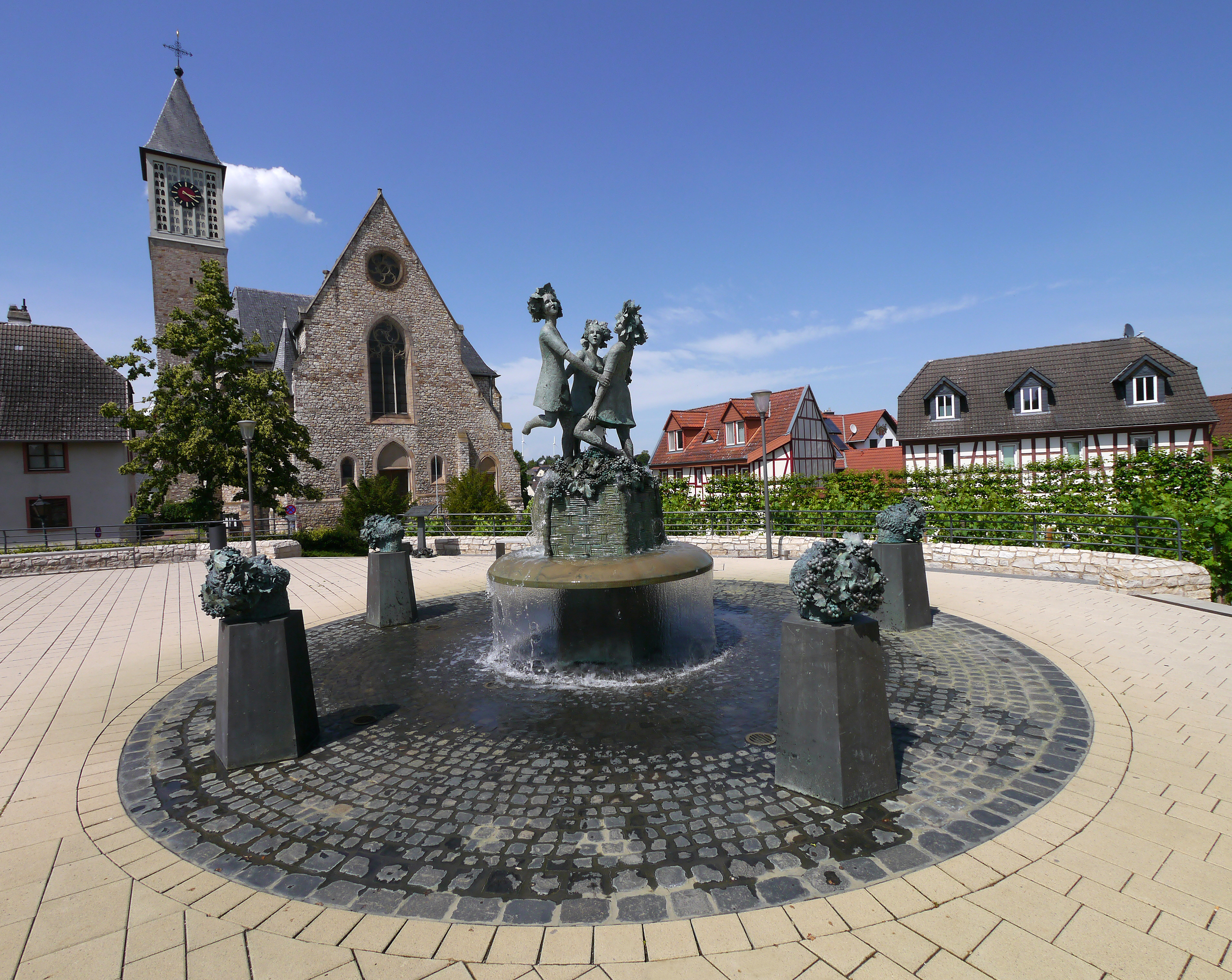

- Coat of arms

- Location of Zornheim within Mainz-Bingen district
- Interactive map of Zornheim
- Location within Germany Location within Rhineland-Palatinate
- Coordinates: 49°53′20″N 8°13′35″E
- Country: Germany
- State: Rhineland-Palatinate
- District: Mainz-Bingen
- Municipal assoc.: Nieder-Olm

Government
  - Mayor (2024–29): Ralf Jürgen Winter (CDU)

Area
  - Total: 5.58 km^{2} (2.15 sq mi)
- Elevation: 214 m (702 ft)

Population (2025-12-31)
  - Total: 3,577
  - Density: 641/km^{2} (1,660/sq mi)
- Time zone: UTC+01:00 (CET)
  - Summer (DST): UTC+02:00 (CEST)
- Postal codes: 55270
- Dialling codes: 06136
- Vehicle registration: MZ
- Website: www.zornheim.de

Zornheim (German pronunciation: [ˈtsɔʁnhaɪm]) is an Ortsgemeinde – a municipality belonging to a Verbandsgemeinde, a kind of collective municipality – in the Mainz-Bingen district in Rhineland-Palatinate, Germany.

== Geography ==
=== Location ===
Zornheim borders in the southwest on Ebersheim, an outlying centre of the state capital of Mainz on the edge of the Frankfurt Rhine Main Region. The municipality lies in Rhenish Hesse and is a winegrowing centre in the Rheinhessen wine region.

Many wineries have been growing and making wine here for centuries. In 1973, in the course of administrative reform, Zornheim became part of the Verbandsgemeinde of Nieder-Olm, whose seat is in the like-named town.

== History ==
In 771, Zornheim had its first documentary mention. Zornheim's founding, however, reaches far back into early history, as witnessed by finds from the New Stone Age, the Bronze Age, the Iron Age and Roman times. The first written reference in 771 is in a document detailing a donation to the Fulda Abbey. Since this donation document dealt with two vineyards, it is known that there was already winegrowing here then.

From the 8th to 12th century, besides various Mainz monasteries, Saint Alban's Abbey (also in Mainz – not to be confused with the one in England, which is actually consecrated to another saint) held the most important properties in Zornheim. After the Lords of Bolanden had transferred sovereignty over Zornheim to one of the Counts of Hohenfels about 1220, the fiefholders then sold the village and the court of Zornheim to Saint Clare's Convent at Mainz (Mainzer Kloster Sankt Klara) after receiving Count of Hohenfels Hermann II's leave to do so. In the sale document issued at Oppenheim on 9 June 1329, the selling price is named: 200 pounds of Hellers.

Thereafter, the abbess and the convent held not only extensive lands in the Zornheim municipal area, but rather also the immediate lordship over the village. This might well have lasted longer if not for the fear of a takeover by Electoral Mainz, which was growing ever mightier.

Thus, on 2 September 1578, Abbess Ursula Steinhauserin von Neidenfels transferred all power over Zornheim to the Prince-Archbishop of Mainz Daniel Brendel von Homburg, whereas the convent kept its landholdings until it was dissolved in 1781. It was handed over on 12 November of the same year to the University of Mainz endowment fund. The year 1691 was very grim for the village as, like many other villages in the Nine Years' War, it was burnt down.

Between 1792 and 1813, French sovereignty brought about decisive changes, as from this time forth, secular lords held sway. In 1816, Zornheim passed to the Grand Duchy of Hesse.

For the village's further development, important measures were undertaken in the late 19th and early 20th century. In 1887, a two-classroom school building with two teacher's dwellings was built, and in 1894 and 1895 arose the current parish church. The Ebersheim-Zornheim-Wahlheimerhof district road was built between 1898 and 1901.

The development of a spring area, the building of a water cistern and the laying of waterpipes were carried out between 1900 and 1902. Zornheim was provided with an electrical supply in 1912 and 1913 and in 1914 the convent house with a children's school was built.

After the World Wars, the municipality passed to the newly formed state of Rhineland-Palatinate. In 1947, through volunteer work by many Zornheim citizens, the graveyard was expanded and part of the graveyard wall was built. A contribution to the relief of the need in which refugees driven from former German lands found themselves was made by the parish and civic community when the former parish barn was converted into three flats. Owing to the growing number of schoolchildren, a third schoolroom was built in 1954. After a new primary school was built, the old schoolhouse served Evangelical Christians as their gathering place until the Evangelical Community Centre was dedicated in 1988.

The Catholic parish church's tower was given a greater height in 1955 and 1956, becoming 43 m taller than before. The four-bell peal can thereby now be heard far and wide.

Because more and more farmers could no longer farm as their main occupation after currency reform in 1948, the winegrowers and farmers who were still left modernized and enlarged their businesses.

At the same time in the years that followed, in stages, farm field Flurbereinigung and vineyard apportionments were undertaken. The highlight was formed by the dedication of the first wine learning path in the Mainz-Bingen district at the end of the “Dechenberg” apportionment process on 30 June 1979.

=== Zornheim from 1960 to present ===
The last few decades of local history were characterized by development that saw the population figure rise from roughly 1,000 to more than 3,700. For this, great efforts were required of the mayors Hans Steib (1960–1979), Richard Becker (1979–2003) and Dr. Werner Dahmen (2003- ) and the councillors and administrations at their side. Praiseworthy, too, were the understanding on the citizenry's part and the readiness on the designated authorities’ part to support the municipality in many projects. The following overview makes clear how Zornheim came to develop into what it is today.

Beginning in 1962, the new building areas of Niedernberg-Weidenweg, Südstraße, Kappel, Banggarten, Obere Pfortengewann and Elfmorgen were opened up and developed. In 1963 the school and the teacher's house on Hahnheimer Straße were completed. From 1962 to 1967, the whole village got sewerage, the water supply network was overhauled, all streets were paved with asphalt, a sewage treatment plant was built and a children's playground was laid out.

In 1966, Zornheim took part for the first time in the contest Unser Dorf soll schöner werden (“Our Village Should Become Lovelier”) and came away as district and regional winner.

In October 1967 the new Zomheim-Mommenheim district road was ready to be opened to traffic. In the same year, Zornheim was awarded a prize of honour in bronze for having advanced as far as the state competition in Unser Dorf soll schöner werden. A new, purpose-built Town Hall came into being in 1968 in the middle of the village. To improve the water supply, a second water cistern was brought into service in 1969 with a capacity of 400 m^{3}.

In 1970, the municipality earned a prize of honour in silver at the beautification contest at the state level. On Volkstrauertag 1970, a modern graveyard chapel was ready to be opened. With the dedication of the new fire station in June 1971, a great team effort by the volunteer fire brigade was accomplished with over 2,000 man-hours of work by the firefighters.

In October 1971, Zornheim was connected to the state capital Mainz's urban transport network and in December of the same year, a four-class kindergarten was dedicated. In 1972, the convent house was thoroughly renovated and modernized.

In the course of administrative reform, Zornheim passed on New Year's Day 1973 to the newly formed Verbandsgemeinde of Nieder-Olm. In the same year, the opening and development of the new building area of Zornheim-Nord was begun.

To ensure an even water pressure in the community's higher neighbourhoods, a pressure-increasing facility was brought into service in July 1975.

In November 1975, the Kindergarten Zornheim-Nord was dedicated, although it was put at the primary school’s disposal as the school on Hahnheimer Straße was no longer adequate. A further playground and a rollerskating path were built in 1976. Furthermore, two tennis courts were opened in the same year. Since then, the facility has been expanded to four courts and a clubhouse has been built.

On 23 July 1976, the gymnasium in the village core was dedicated in connection with the Village Association Evening. In 1978, Zornheim once again was awarded a prize of honour in bronze at the beautification contest at the state level.

Since early 1979, responsibility for the waterworks has lain with the Bodenheim Water Supply Association (Wasserversorgungsverband Bodenheim). At the same time, the building area of Zornheim-Nord was connected to the communal sewage treatment plant in Mommenheim.

On 17 June 1979, the new graveyard land, which harmoniously abuts the old graveyard, was readied. A few months later in 1979, the Mainz-Bingen district’s first learning path north of Mommenheimer Straße was dedicated.

In 1983, Zornheim got a new outdoor sport facility along Hahnheimer Straße with a clubhouse.

The next year, the partnership agreement with the French municipality of Mareuil-le-Port was signed. To it belong the three centres of Mareuil-le-Port, Port-à-Binson and Cerseuil.

In the years 1986 and 1987 the building area of Elfmorgen was expanded by one row of buildings, forming the basis of the building plan “Elfmorgen II”. Herein were allotted for the first time building lots on the “Zornheim Model”.

On 4 September 1988, the Evangelical parish consecrated its community centre on Nieder-Olmer Straße.

Between 1988 and 1990, the municipal streets were torn up many times to lay gas mains and broadband television cables.

After construction that had taken two years, the new Gemeindehof (roughly “community centre”) was ready for opening in 1991. It houses the municipal administration with a council chamber, a wine cellar, the public library, a youth room, a seniors’ room and a mail room. In part of the first floor, flats have been built.

In 1990, after German reunification, a partnership with the Thuringian municipality of Großrudestedt was sealed. The municipality is made up of the villages of Schwansee, Kranichborn, Kleinrudestedt and Großrudestedt.

In 1994, the Old Town Hall's façade on Mareuil-le-Port-Platz was remodelled and the building was let to a resident planning office.

To make it possible for more families to build their own houses, a further expansion of the building area of Elfmorgen was realized in 1993 with the building plan “Elfmorgen III”.

In 1994 came the conversion and expansion of the primary school and the Catholic kindergarten.

For the new church's 100th anniversary in 1995, the churchtower and the clock were renovated. In the next ten years the ceiling and wall paintings inside the church were renewed.

Former mayor Hans-Steib was named an honorary citizen of the municipality in 1995.

In 1996 came the groundbreaking for the new building area of “Pfortengewann I”. A food market and a recycling yard became parts of it.

== Politics ==
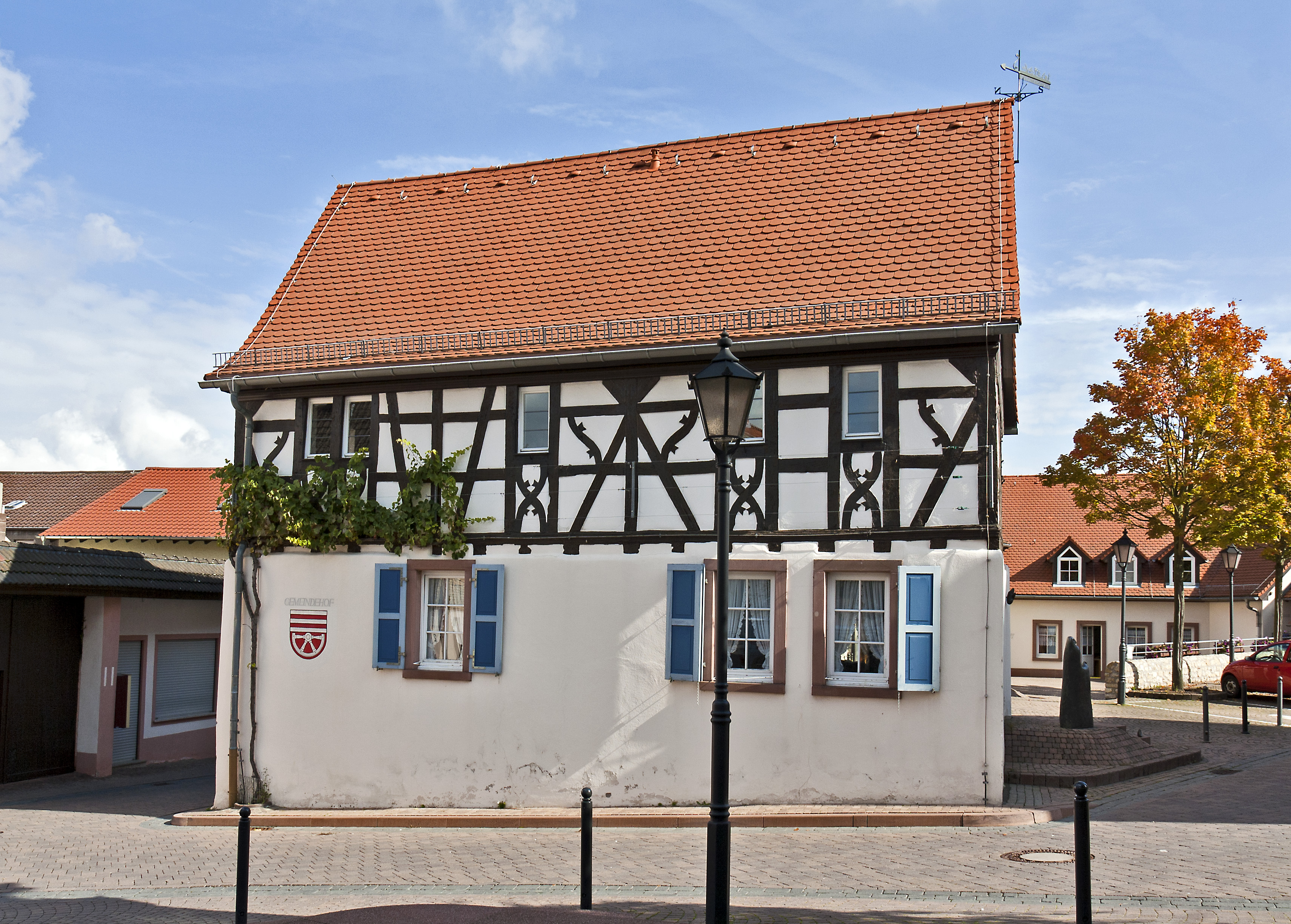
Zornheim town hall

=== Mayors ===
The penultimate mayor is Dr. Werner Dahmen (CDU). He was chosen by 72.4% of Zornheim's voters. He replaced Richard Becker (FWG) in 2003 who, on personal grounds, retired.

Dennis Diehl (CDU) was elected as mayor in 2019. He was replaced by Ralf Jürgen Winter (CDU) on 9 July 2024.

=== Municipal council ===
The council is made up of 21 council members, counting the part-time mayor, with seats apportioned thus:

	SPD	CDU	FWG	Total
2014	6	10	4	20 seats
2019	6	10	4	20 seats
2024	5	10	5	20 seats

=== Town partnerships ===
- Mareuil-le-Port, Marne, France
- (Germany) Großrudestedt, Sömmerda district, Thuringia

=== Coat of arms ===
The municipality's arms might be described thus: Per fess barry of five argent and gules, and gules a wheel spoked of six couped at the upper edge of the hub of the first; half Wheel of Mainz.

== Culture and sightseeing ==
=== Theatre ===
- Theatre group Alla Hopp

=== Music ===
- Männergesangverein 1845 Zornheim (men's singing club)
- Gesangverein Sängerbund Zornheim (1911) (singing club)
- Musikfreunde Zornheim (1972)
- Evangelical church choir (1976)
- CHORisma - formerly Singkreis - (1991)

=== Buildings ===
- Saint Bartholomew's Catholic Church (Katholische Kirche St. Bartholomäus)

=== Sport ===
- Turn- und Sportverein Zornheim (1895) (gymnastics and sport)
- Tennisclub Zornheim (1975)
- Wanderfreunde 2002 Zornheim Laaf mit! (hiking)

=== Clubs ===
- Freiwillige Feuerwehr Zornheim (1887) (volunteer fire brigade)
- Carneval-Verein Zornheim (1931)
- Landfrauenverein (countrywomen)
- Bauernverein (farmers)
- Seniorenclub Zornheim (1976)
- Katholische Landjugendbewegung -KLJB- (1984) (“catholic country youth movement”)
- Bayern-Fanclub Rhoihesse-Heros
- FCK-Fanclub Zornheim

== Economy and infrastructure ==
=== Winegrowing ===
Zornheim lies in the Bereich Nierstein in the Rheinhessen wine region. Its Großlage (grouping in the German system of wine classification) comprises the vineyards Mönchbäumchen, Pilgerweg, Dachgewann, Guldenmorgen and Vogelsang.

=== Education ===
- Grundschule Zornheim (primary school)
