= Minerbe =

- Comune
- Comune di Minerbe
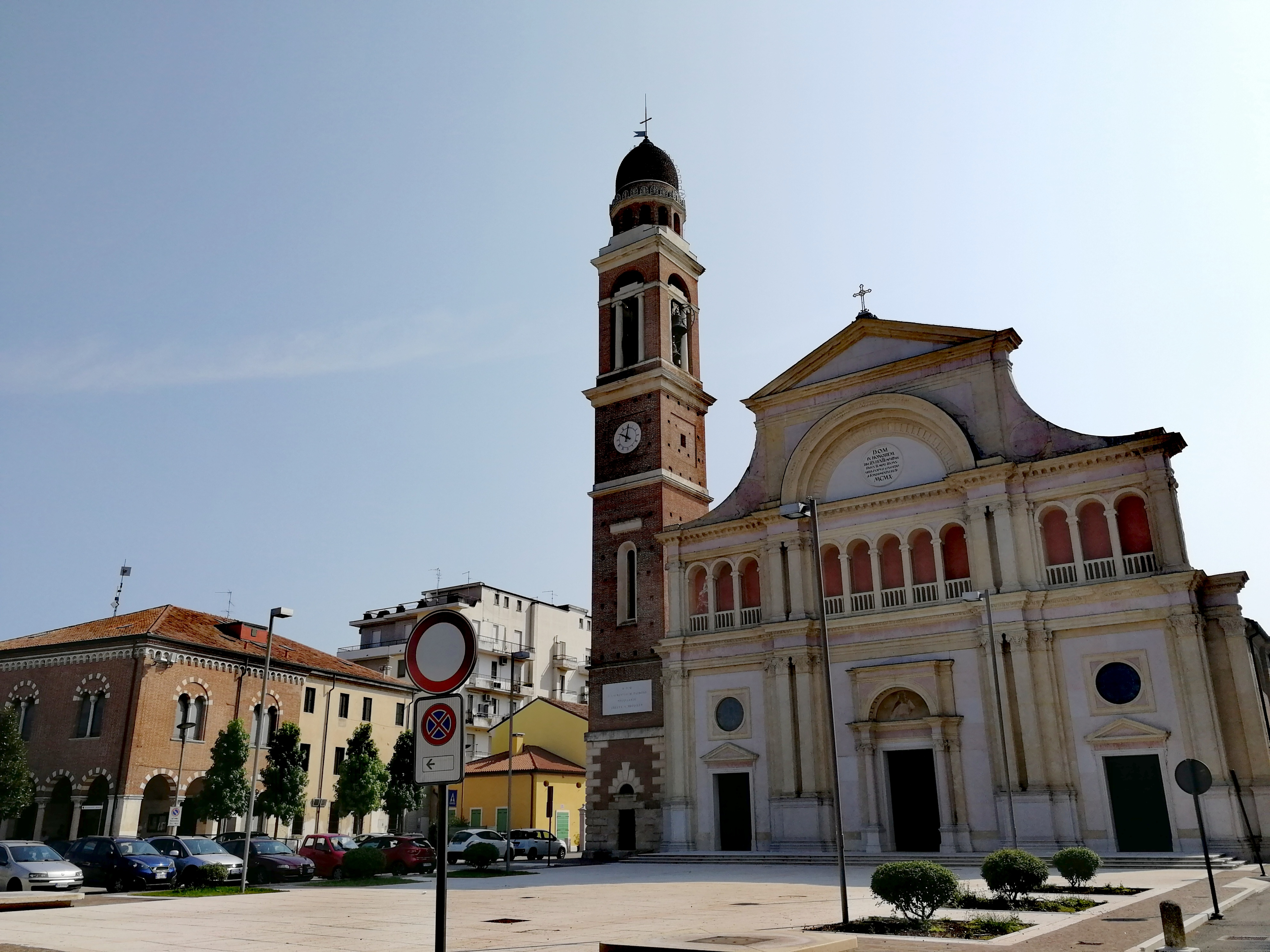
- San Lorenzo Martire church

- Coat of arms

- Location within Italy Location within Veneto
- Coordinates: 45°15′N 11°21′E
- Country: Italy
- Region: Veneto
- Province: Verona (VR)
- Frazioni: Anson, Santo Stefano, San Zenone

Government
  - Mayor: Andrea Girardi

Area
  - Total: 29.7 km^{2} (11.5 sq mi)
- Elevation: 16 m (52 ft)

Population (31 December 2015)
  - Total: 4,619
  - Density: 156/km^{2} (403/sq mi)
- Demonym: Minerbesi
- Time zone: UTC+1 (CET)
  - Summer (DST): UTC+2 (CEST)
- Postal code: 37046
- Dialing code: 0442
- Patron saint: St. Lawrence
- Saint day: August 10
- Website: Official website

Minerbe is a comune (municipality) in the Province of Verona in the Italian region Veneto, located about 80 kilometres (50 mi) west of Venice and about 35 kilometres (22 mi) southeast of Verona.

== Twin towns ==
- Schwabenheim an der Selz, Germany, since 2001
