= Essenheim =

- Municipality
- Coat of arms

- Location of Essenheim within Mainz-Bingen district
- Interactive map of Essenheim
- Location within Germany Location within Rhineland-Palatinate
- Coordinates: 49°55′50″N 8°09′20″E
- Country: Germany
- State: Rhineland-Palatinate
- District: Mainz-Bingen
- Municipal assoc.: Nieder-Olm

Government
  - Mayor (2019–24): Winfried Schnurbus

Area
  - Total: 10.51 km^{2} (4.06 sq mi)
- Elevation: 148 m (486 ft)

Population (2025-12-31)
  - Total: 3,413
  - Density: 324.7/km^{2} (841.1/sq mi)
- Time zone: UTC+01:00 (CET)
  - Summer (DST): UTC+02:00 (CEST)
- Postal codes: 55270
- Dialling codes: 06136
- Vehicle registration: MZ
- Website: www.essenheim.de

Essenheim (German pronunciation: [ˈɛsn̩haɪm]) is an Ortsgemeinde – a municipality belonging to a Verbandsgemeinde, a kind of collective municipality – in the Mainz-Bingen district in Rhineland-Palatinate, Germany.

== Geography ==
=== Location ===
Essenheim lies in Rhenish Hesse southwest of Mainz. The winegrowing centre belongs to the Verbandsgemeinde of Nieder-Olm, whose seat is in the like-named town.

== Politics ==
=== Municipal council ===
Elections in 2014:

- SPD: 11
- CDU: 2
- FWG: 5
- GAL: 2

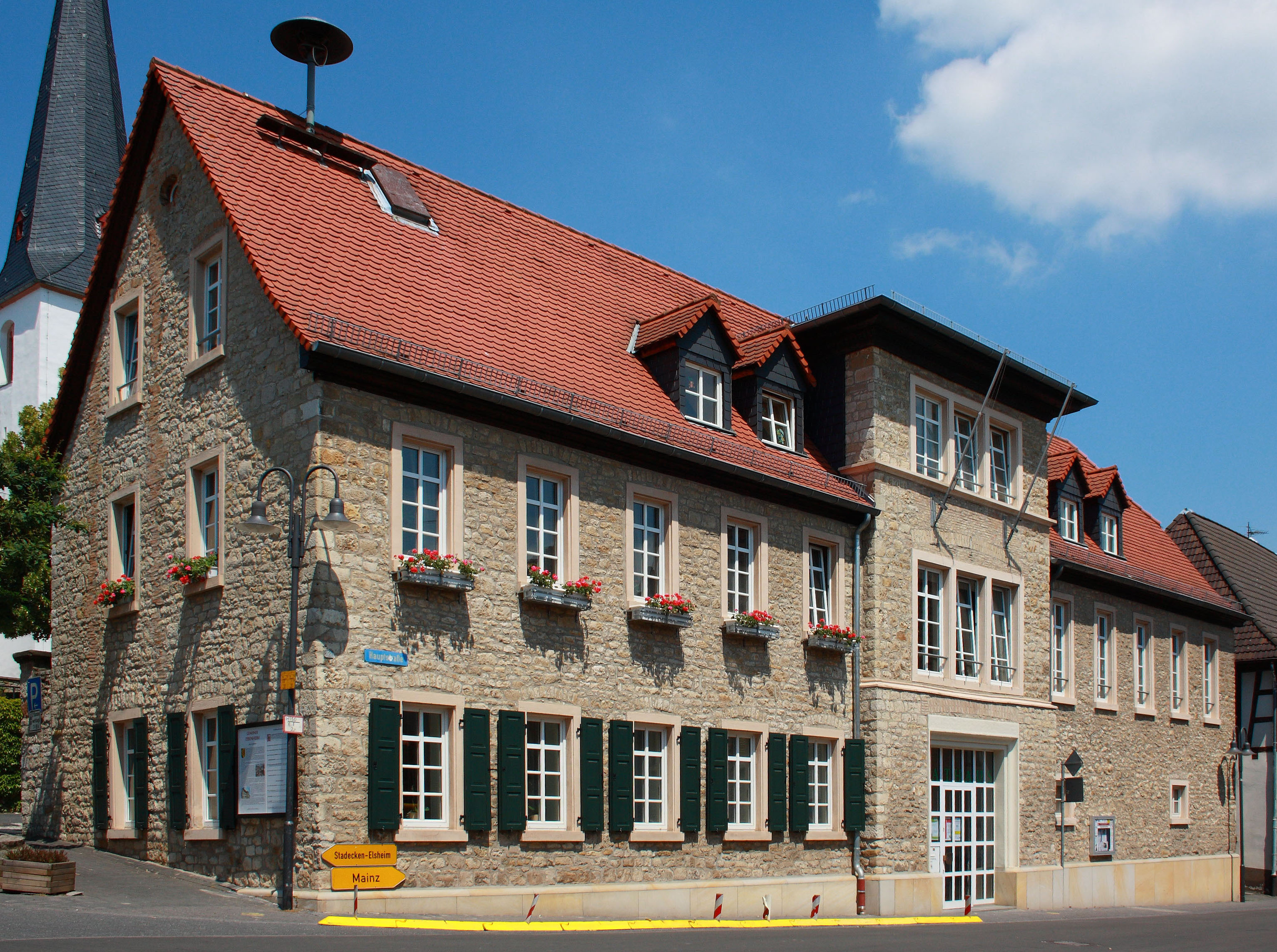
Essenheim Town hall

=== Coat of arms ===
The municipality's arms might be described thus: Per pale sable and Or two lions combattant, the dexter of the second armed, langued and crowned gules, the sinister with double tail of the third armed and langued azure.

== Culture and sightseeing ==
=== Regular events ===
The Essenheim kermis (church consecration festival, locally known as the Kerb) was once held in late August, but since 2007, it has been held on the second weekend in September.

Essenheim also holds the annual Domherrnfest (Canons' Festival), a street and courtyard festival featuring local wines, regional food, and live music.

== Economy and infrastructure ==
Essenheim is characterized by winegrowing and fruitgrowing.

=== Transport ===
- The municipality lies right near the Autobahn A 63 with its Nieder-Olm interchange (4).
- A Deutsche Bahn railway station is to be found in the neighbouring town of Nieder-Olm.
- Two city bus routes run right through Essenheim, routes 71 and 650, both towards either Stadecken or the main railway station in Mainz.
