= Nieder-Olm (Verbandsgemeinde) =

Municipality in Rhineland-Palatinate, Germany

- Verbandsgemeinde
- Location of Nieder-Olm within Mainz-Bingen district
- Interactive map of Nieder-Olm
- Location within Germany Location within Rhineland-Palatinate
- Coordinates: 49°55′N 8°12′E
- Country: Germany
- State: Rhineland-Palatinate
- District: Mainz-Bingen
- Seat: Nieder-Olm
- Subdivisions: 8 municipalities

Area
  - Total: 73.02 km^{2} (28.19 sq mi)

Population (2025-12-31)
  - Total: 32,657
  - Density: 447.2/km^{2} (1,158/sq mi)
- Time zone: UTC+01:00 (CET)
  - Summer (DST): UTC+02:00 (CEST)
- Website: www.vg-nieder-olm.de

Verbandsgemeinde Nieder-Olm is a collective municipality (Verbandsgemeinde) in the district Mainz-Bingen in Rhineland-Palatinate, Germany. The administrative center of the Verbandsgemeinde Nieder-Olm is located in the town of Nieder-Olm. The collective municipality consists of the town of Nieder-Olm and seven independent local municipalities.

== Municipalities ==
The following municipalities form the Verbandsgemeinde Nieder-Olm:

1. Essenheim
2. Jugenheim in Rheinhessen
3. Klein-Winternheim
4. Nieder-Olm, town
5. Ober-Olm
6. Sörgenloch
7. Stadecken-Elsheim
8. Zornheim
