= Nieder-Olm =

- Town
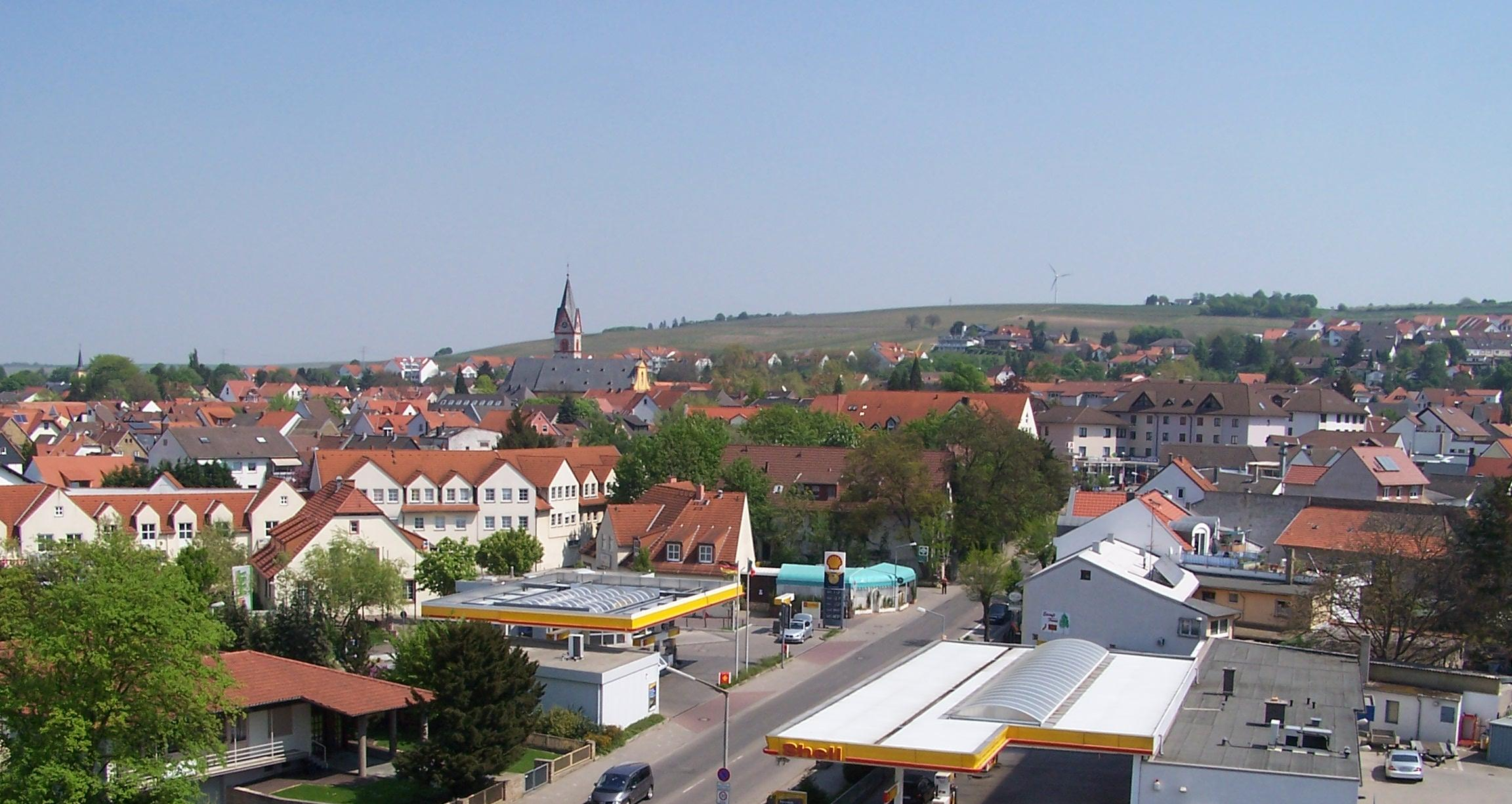
- Nieder-Olm

- Coat of arms

- Location of Nieder-Olm within Mainz-Bingen district
- Interactive map of Nieder-Olm
- Location within Germany Location within Rhineland-Palatinate
- Coordinates: 49°54′30″N 08°12′10″E
- Country: Germany
- State: Rhineland-Palatinate
- District: Mainz-Bingen
- Municipal assoc.: Nieder-Olm

Government
  - Mayor (2019–24): Dirk Hasenfuss (FW)

Area
  - Total: 11.22 km^{2} (4.33 sq mi)
- Elevation: 151 m (495 ft)

Population (2025-12-31)
  - Total: 9,755
  - Density: 869.4/km^{2} (2,252/sq mi)
- Time zone: UTC+01:00 (CET)
  - Summer (DST): UTC+02:00 (CEST)
- Postal codes: 55268
- Dialling codes: 06136
- Vehicle registration: MZ
- Website: www.nieder-olm.de

Nieder-Olm (German pronunciation: [ˈniːdɐ ʔɔlm], lit. 'Lower Olm', in contrast to "Upper Olm") is a town in the Mainz-Bingen district in Rhineland-Palatinate, Germany. Until 5 November 2006 it was an Ortsgemeinde – a municipality belonging to a Verbandsgemeinde, a kind of collective municipality – but it was raised to town the next day. It is still the seat of the Verbandsgemeinde of Nieder-Olm, and functions as a middle centre in the region.

== Geography ==
=== Location ===
Nieder-Olm lies some 10 km south of Mainz in the heart of Rhenish Hesse, on the east bank of the Selz in the northern part of the Rhenish-Hessian Hills (Rheinhessisches Hügelland), known as the Mainz Basin.

The town's average elevation lies at some 150 m above sea level. The highest elevation within municipal limits is the Mühlberg at 243 m in the northeast between Nieder-Olm and Mainz-Ebersheim.

The landscape is strongly characterized by winegrowing and fruit growing. A wood named Im Loh can be found in the northeast of the municipal area. It is only some 11 ha in area.

=== Geology ===
Predominant here are loess soils, which are of very high quality.

=== Climate ===
Owing to the location in the Mainz Basin, the climate in Nieder-Olm is very mild and dry.

The mean temperature over the year is 8 °C, making the area one of the warmest in Central Europe. The yearly precipitation is, at 500 mm, rather slight.

=== Constituent communities ===
Nieder-Olm has one outlying Stadtteil called Goldberg.

=== Neighbouring municipalities ===
Clockwise from the north, these are:

- Ober-Olm (Verbandsgemeinde of Nieder-Olm)
- Klein-Winternheim (Verbandsgemeinde of Nieder-Olm)
- Mainz (outlying centre of Ebersheim)
- Zornheim (Verbandsgemeinde of Nieder-Olm)
- Sörgenloch (Verbandsgemeinde of Nieder-Olm)
- Saulheim (Verbandsgemeinde of Wörrstadt)
- Stadecken-Elsheim (Verbandsgemeinde of Nieder-Olm)
- Essenheim (Verbandsgemeinde of Nieder-Olm)

== History ==
=== Early Middle Ages ===
Since so few written documents about Nieder-Olm from the Middle Ages are available, dating Nieder-Olm founding is difficult. Finds from grave digs from the late 6th century, however, point to an early settlement in this area.

It is believed that this may have been brought about by the early Franks during the so-called Fränkische Landnahme (“Frankish Land-Taking”), when the Franks reconquered the lands formerly held by the Romans. The Frankish settlement called Reichelsheim lay roughly where the commercial development now lies in northwest Nieder-Olm and can still be made out in aerial photographs. The placename ending —heim is typical of names that the Franks gave places, including many other nearby places. Reichelsheim, though, was later forsaken.

=== Middle Ages ===
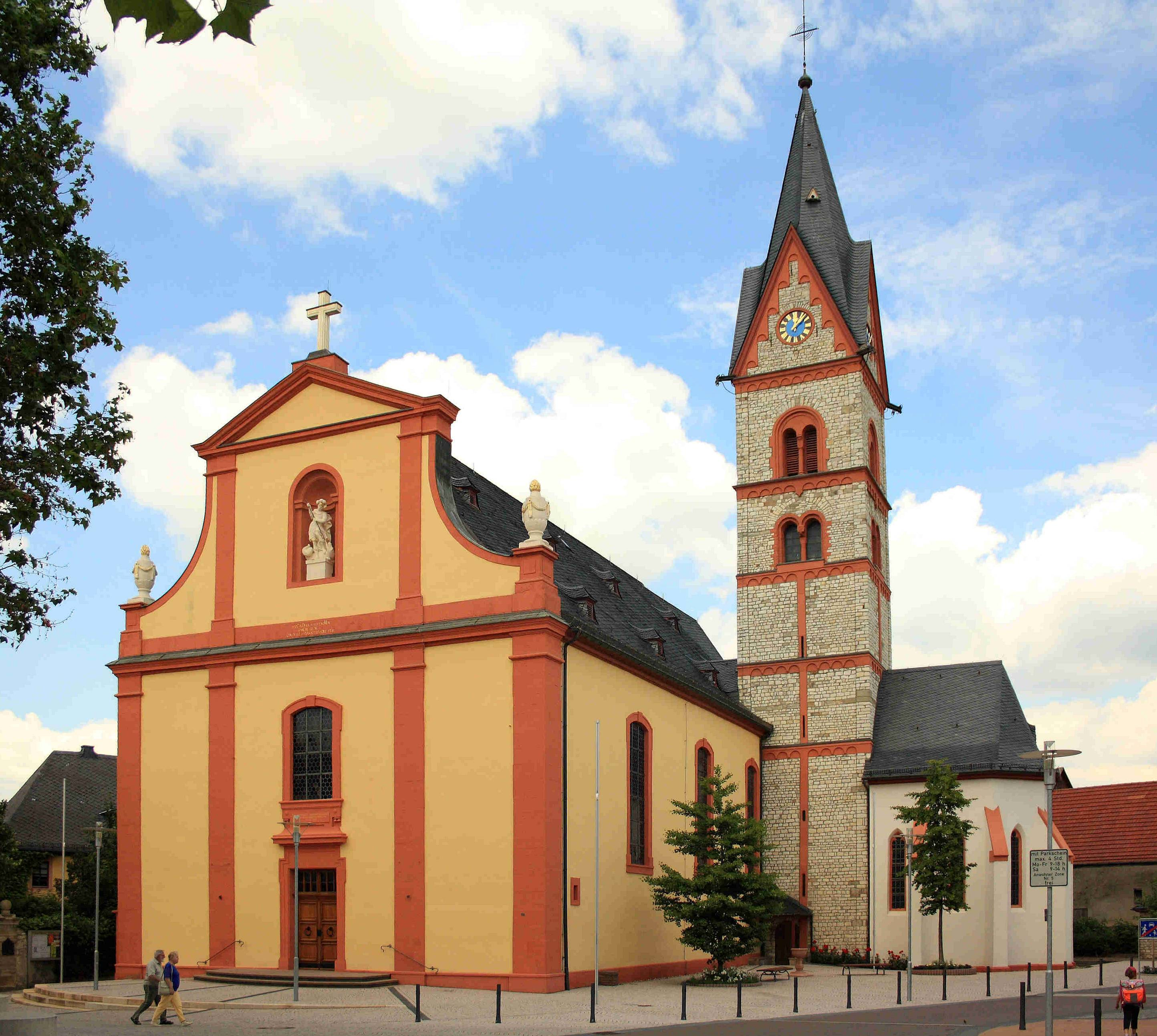
Saint George's Catholic Church in Nieder-Olm

From the Middle Ages, Nieder-Olm was an Electoral Mainz holding. It is established by documents that in 899 Archbishop of Mainz Hatto I made over a landholding called Ulmena (Olm) to the wife of Emperor Arnulf of Carinthia with a lifetime term. This estate is believed to have lain in the area now occupied by Ober-Olm and is both municipalities’ namesake. In 994, at Emperor Otto III's behest, the estate was put back under the Archbishopric's ownership. In the late 11th century, ownership was transferred to the Mainz Cathedral Foundation, in which time also arose Saint George's Catholic Church, expedited by strong ecclesiastical influence.

The settlement's first fortifications are believed to date from the 12th century. These were made up of walls and ditches and had four main gates. Later, in the late 13th century, supposedly as a reaction to the building of Stadeck Castle, a castle with a moat was built within the municipal boundaries, to which noble Burgmänner were given priority.

In the 15th century, Nieder-Olm found itself caught between the frontlines in an archiepiscopal feud being waged by Archbishops Diether von Isenburg and Adolf von Nassau. Its consequences entailed frequent changes in rulers. In 1503, Archbishop Berthold had the castle newly built to meet the requirements of what were then modern attack techniques. From this time, the castle was known as St. Laurenziburg. In the years that followed, both the castle and the fortifications were repeatedly destroyed. Today only a few remnants are left. In the early 19th century, the castle finally had to give way to a road. Quite well preserved is the defensive complex at the graveyard, which at the time surrounded the church.

=== Early modern times ===
During the Thirty Years' War, Nieder-Olm was repeatedly overrun by the enemy and in 1632 it was occupied by Swedish troops. Some 60 years later, in the Nine Years' War, Nieder-Olm was sacked by French troops.

Once again in the late 18th century, Nieder-Olm was occupied. This time it was French Revolutionary troops. The French put a Liberty pole up in 1792 and made Nieder-Olm a part of the Republic of Mainz, which was the first democratic republic on German territory. Only a short time later – the Republic of Mainz only lasted 100 days – Nieder-Olm was reconquered by Imperial troops.

As soon afterwards as 1797, though, French troops managed to take Nieder-Olm once again, and it thus became part of the Napoleonic Empire. After this fell, Nieder-Olm became in 1816 part of the newly founded province of Rhenish Hesse (Rheinhessen), which also made it part of the Grand Duchy of Hesse-Darmstadt.

With the opening of the Hessian Ludwig Railway from Mainz to Alzey in 1871, Nieder-Olm was linked to the railway network.

=== First and Second World Wars ===
After the First World War, Nieder-Olm once again became French-occupied under the terms of the Treaty of Versailles. A border station of the occupied Rhineland was set up in an inn at that time, the Gasthaus zur schönen Aussicht.

Having been returned to German sovereignty in 1929, Nieder-Olm was no more spared National Socialism than any other part of Germany. After Kristallnacht (9 November 1938), in which Jewish houses and shops were looted and destroyed, there were no more Jewish inhabitants in Nieder-Olm.

Into the history of the Second World War went Nieder-Olm when during the Allied advance, scattered German troops in the Selz valley put up considerable resistance. Bearing witness to this time are American emplacements west of the Selz, which have, however, for safety's sake, been filled in.

=== Postwar to present ===
From 1946, Nieder-Olm belonged to the newly founded state of Rhineland-Palatinate.

In the decades that followed, the infrastructure was under ongoing expansion: new schools arose (in 1957 the new primary school Burgschule Nieder-Olm, in 1974 the Hauptschule and special school and in 1981 the Gymnasium, as well as two schools for physically handicapped pupils and those with learning difficulties), a gymnasium and festival hall (1961) and the indoor and outdoor swimming pool (1968) were built. In 1980 the town acquired a connection to the A 63.

Also in the last two decades, development was steadily furthered: new residential areas were laid out and older ones continually expanded. The commercial area was amply expanded and three new bypasses were built. In 1997 the old festival hall was torn down and replaced with the new Ludwig-Eckes-Halle. Likewise, the indoor and outdoor swimming pool was expanded into an adventure pool.

Further upgrading is planned with a view to barring all through traffic and doing further building work, especially in the area around the primary school and Pariser Straße.

Today, Nieder-Olm has over 10,000 inhabitants and the number is growing. The Rhineland-Palatinate Cabinet decided on 24 October 2006 to grant Nieder-Olm the designation “town” (Stadt in German). Nieder-Olm has been allowed since the delivery of the granting documents on 6 November 2006 by Rhineland-Palatinate Interior Minister Karl Peter Bruch to call itself the “Town of Nieder-Olm” (Stadt Nieder-Olm).

== Politics ==
=== Town council ===
The council is made up of 24 council members, counting the mayor, with seats apportioned thus:

	CDU	SPD	FWG	The Greens	FDP	Total
2024	6	4	13	4	1	28 seats

(as at municipal election held on 9 June 2024)

=== Mayor ===
In 2019, Dirk Hasenfuss was elected as mayor of Nieder-Olm.

=== Town partnerships ===
- Recey-sur-Ource, Côte-d'Or, France since 1967
- Bussolengo, Province of Verona, Veneto, Italy since 1984
- L'Alcúdia, Valencia, Spain since 1989

=== Coat of arms ===
The town's arms might be described thus: Per fess argent a cross moline gules and gules a wheel spoked of six argent.

The earliest seal, from 1519, shows the cross moline (that is, cross with pointed split ends turned out), whereas later ones show a cross pattée (that is, cross whose arms broaden at the ends, which are flat). The original form was chosen for inclusion in the modern arms.

The reason for the cross's inclusion as a charge is unclear, although it has been suggested that it refers to Saint George, who is the patron saint. The wheel is the Wheel of Mainz, and refers to Nieder-Olm's allegiance to Electoral Mainz until 1803. The tinctures are also Mainz's.

== Culture and sightseeing ==
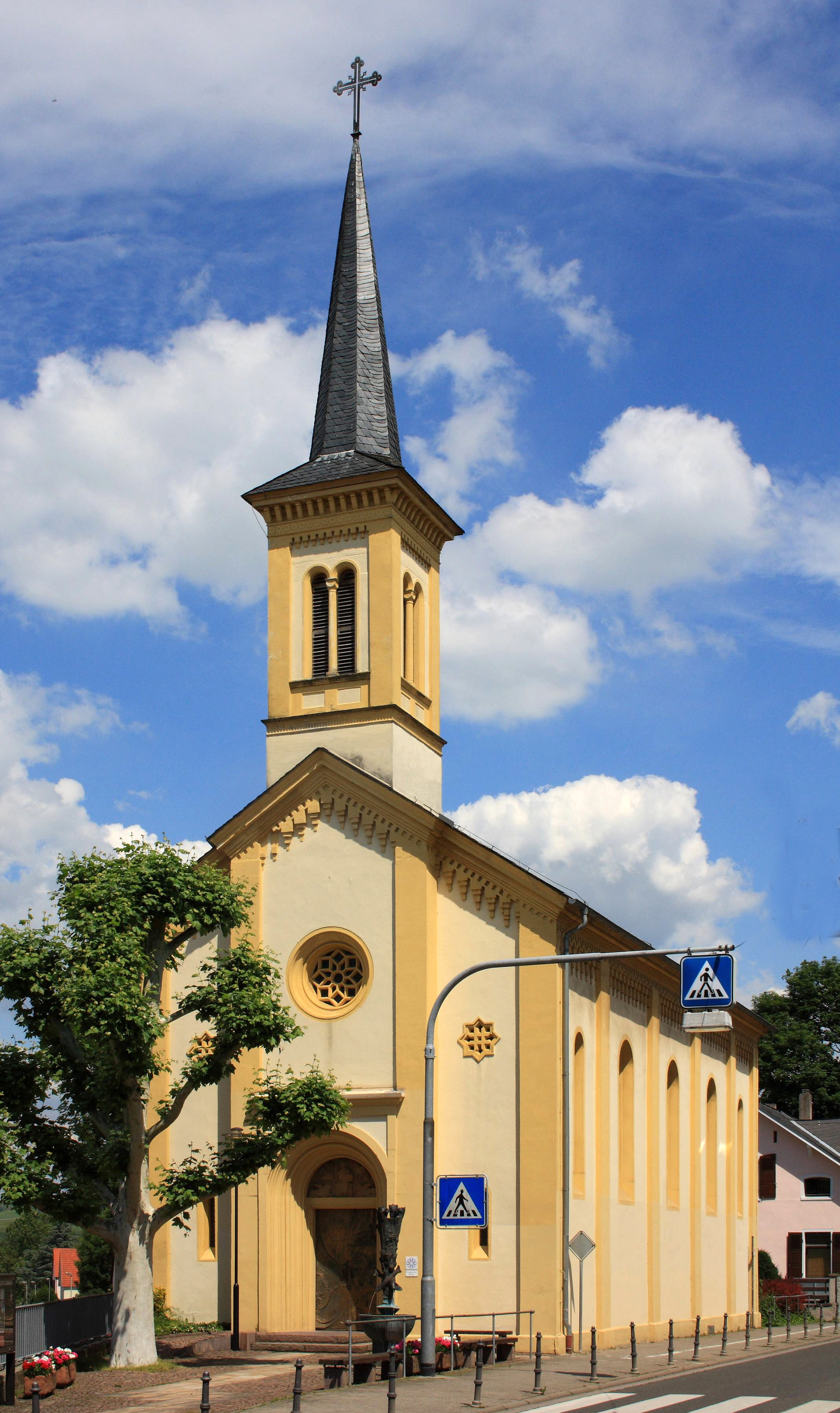
The Evangelical Parish Church in Nieder-Olm

=== Buildings ===
- The Evangelical Parish Church from the Late Classicist period was completed in 1865. It harbours a pulpit and altar table from 1808, both from the now demolished Welschnonnenkirche in Mainz.
- Saint George's Catholic Parish Church comes from the year 1779. The quire tower on the east side is a remnant of the old mediaeval church from the 12th century; it was given a greater height and modified later in the 19th century.

=== Regular events ===
- Fire brigade's New Year's Ball on the first Saturday in January
- Sebastianus-Theatertage in January
- Rathausstürmung (“Town Hall Storming”) on Fat Thursday
- Street Festival on the first weekend after Ascension Day
- Collective Municipality's Wine Culture Days (Weinkulturtage der Verbandsgemeinde) on the third weekend in June
- Wind Ensemble's Summer Night Festival (Sommernachtsfest des Bläserchores) in the summer holidays
- Kermis (church consecration festival, locally known as the Kerb) on the first weekend in September
- Christmas Market in the first two weeks of Advent

== Economy and infrastructure ==
The head office of Eckes AG, a financial holding company, has been in Nieder-Olm since 1857.

=== Transport ===
==== Roads ====
The Autobahn A 63 from Kaiserslautern to Mainz passes Nieder-Olm in the west and is linked to the town through two interchanges. On the one hand it is easy to reach the important north–south connection, the A 61 along this road, and on the other, it serves as a feeder to the urban agglomeration of the Frankfurt Rhine Main Region and the other Autobahnen that lead there.

Over several Landesstraßen (State Roads), Nieder-Olm is linked with neighbouring municipalities.

==== Local public transport ====
===== Bus =====
Starting from 2023, Nieder-Olm has its own minibus route numbered 651 with the goal to connect the neighbourhoods with the centre.

The town is further connected with other bus routes to local public transport by the bus operator Kommunalverkehr Rhein-Nahe:

- Route 66: Nieder-Olm - Mainz-Ebersheim - Mainz-Hechtsheim - Mainz-Oberstadt - Mainz-Altstadt (Mainzer Verkehrsgesellschaft)
- Route 640: RegioLinie Ingelheim - Schwabenheim - Nieder-Olm - Zornheim - Mommenheim - Nierstein-Schwabsburg - Nierstein - Oppenheim
- Route 652: Mainz - Klein-Winternheim - Nieder-Olm - Sörgenloch - Hahnheim - Selzen - Köngernheim - Undenheim
- Route 653: Mainz - Klein-Winternheim - Ober-Olm - Essenheim - Nieder-Olm
- Route 656: Mainz-Lerchenberg - Klein-Winternheim - Ober-Olm - Essenheim - Nieder-Olm
- Route 657: Sprendlingen / Budenheim / Mainz - Nieder-Olm Schulzentrum (school transport)
- Route 667: Nieder-Olm Schulzentrum- Friesenheim (school transport)

===== Rail =====
In the east of downtown is found the Deutsche Bahn railway station. On weekdays, it is served strictly by half-hourly regional trains (RE/RB) in both directions on the Alzey–Mainz line. Even on Sundays and holidays, the service is only slightly less. In the morning rush hour there are two direct connections to Worms by way of Alzey. In the summer months, a few trains go through to Kirchheimbolanden. On weekends and holidays, journeys on the Elsass-Express (“Alsace Express”) to Wissembourg are possible.

=== Public institutions ===
Nieder-Olm is the seat of the Verbandsgemeinde of Nieder-Olm.

=== Education ===
- Burgschule Nieder-Olm, primary school
- Gymnasium Nieder-Olm
- Regionale Schule Nieder-Olm, Hauptschule and Realschule, beginning in the 2008/2009 school year, an integrated comprehensive school
- Selztalschule, special school with the emphasis on “Learning”
- Schule für Körperbehinderte Nieder-Olm, special school for physically handicapped pupils

== Famous people ==
=== Sons and daughters of the town ===
- Ludwig Eckes (b. 28 April 1913, d. 14 January 1984), entrepreneur
- Wilhelm Holzamer (b. 28 March 1870, d. 28 August 1907), writer
- Jean Metten (b. 9 May 1884, d. 26 June 1971), painter
- Richard and Hilda Strauss, founders of Strauss Group.

=== Famous people working in town ===
- Werner von Moltke (b. 1936), 1966 European champion in decathlon and today president of the Deutscher Volleyball-Verband e. V.
- Liesel Metten, sculptor
