= Mareuil-le-Port =

- Commune
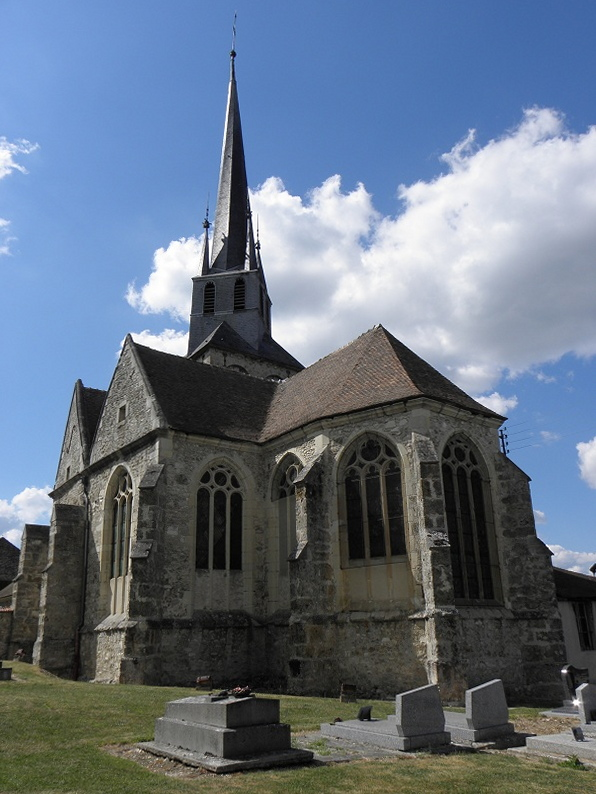
- The church in Mareuil-le-Port

- Coat of arms
- Location of Mareuil-le-Port
- Location within France Location within Grand Est
- Coordinates: 49°05′00″N 3°44′43″E
- Country: France
- Region: Grand Est
- Department: Marne
- Arrondissement: Épernay
- Canton: Dormans-Paysages de Champagne

Government
  - Mayor (2020–2026): Olivier Veaux
- Area^{1}: 8.96 km^{2} (3.46 sq mi)
- Elevation: 68 m (223 ft)
- Population (2023): 1,150
  - Density: 128/km^{2} (332/sq mi)
- Time zone: UTC+01:00 (CET)
  - Summer (DST): UTC+02:00 (CEST)
- INSEE/Postal code: 51346 /51700
- ^{1} French Land Register data, which excludes lakes, ponds, glaciers > 1 km^{2} (0.386 sq mi or 247 acres) and river estuaries.

Mareuil-le-Port (French pronunciation: [maʁœj lə pɔʁ]) is a commune in the Marne department in north-eastern France.

== See also ==
- Communes of the Marne department
