= Wilhelm Holzamer =

German writer

Wilhelm Holzamer (born in Nieder-Olm, Rhenish Hesse, 28 March 1870; died in Berlin, 28 August 1907) was a German novelist and short-story writer.

== Biography ==
He was the son of an artisan and first prepared himself for the calling of a common school teacher, serving in that capacity at the Realschule of Heppenheim an der Bergstraße from 1892 to 1896. His literary career began during these years, with the production of poems and short stories, and a number of monographs on German writers, prepared for newspapers in Germany and in the United States.

After 1896 he devoted himself entirely to literary pursuits, retaining his home at Heppenheim until 1902, when Grand Duke Ernst Ludwig of Hesse, whose attention had been called to the poet in so favorable a manner that he was determined to give him an opportunity to develop his talents, called him to Darmstadt to become his private librarian. After occupying this position for a few years, Holzamer left it and settled in Paris as correspondent for a number of German papers, moving to Berlin in 1905, where he fell sick with diphtheria and died in the Elizabeth Hospital.

== Works ==
As of 1920, only one of his short stories had been translated into English (“Cellist Behnke” in The New Review, April 1914); it gives an excellent idea of his impressionistic word painting. Among his works are:

- Meine Lieder (poems, 1892)
- Auf staubigen Strassen (sketches, 1898)
- Im Dorf und draussen (short stories, 1901)
- Die Siegesallee (letters on art, 1902)
- Ellida Solstratten (novel, 1904)
- Biographies of Konrad Ferdinand Meyer and Heinrich Heine (1905)
- Der Entgleiste (novel in 2 vols., 1910)
