= Klein-Winternheim =

- Municipality
- Coat of arms

- Location of Klein-Winternheim within Mainz-Bingen district
- Interactive map of Klein-Winternheim
- Location within Germany Location within Rhineland-Palatinate
- Coordinates: 49°56′17″N 8°12′42″E
- Country: Germany
- State: Rhineland-Palatinate
- District: Mainz-Bingen
- Municipal assoc.: Nieder-Olm
- Subdivisions: 2

Government
  - Mayor (2019–24): Ute Granold (CDU)

Area
  - Total: 5.51 km^{2} (2.13 sq mi)
- Elevation: 160 m (520 ft)

Population (2025-12-31)
  - Total: 3,565
  - Density: 647/km^{2} (1,680/sq mi)
- Time zone: UTC+01:00 (CET)
  - Summer (DST): UTC+02:00 (CEST)
- Postal codes: 55270
- Dialling codes: 06136
- Vehicle registration: MZ
- Website: www.klein-winternheim.de

Klein-Winternheim is an Ortsgemeinde – a municipality belonging to a Verbandsgemeinde, a kind of collective municipality – in the Mainz-Bingen district in Rhineland-Palatinate, Germany.

== Geography ==
=== Location ===
Klein-Winternheim lies seven kilometres south of Mainz in Rhenish Hesse. The winegrowing centre belongs to the Verbandsgemeinde of Nieder-Olm, whose seat is in the like-named town.

== History ==
In the oldest Mainz Cathedral obituary from about 1100, the name Winterheim crops up for the first time.

== Politics ==
=== Municipal council ===
The council is made up of 20 council members, plus the part-time mayor, with seats apportioned thus:

	CDU	SPD	FWG	Total
2024	8	4	8	20 seats

(as at municipal election held on 9 June 2024)

=== Twin towns ===
- Muizon, Marne, France
- (Germany) Elxleben, Sömmerda district, Thuringia – close contacts since 1990

=== Coat of arms ===
The municipality's arms might be described thus: Gules a saltire couped Or, in base a wheel spoked of six argent; Wheel of Mainz.

== Economy and infrastructure ==
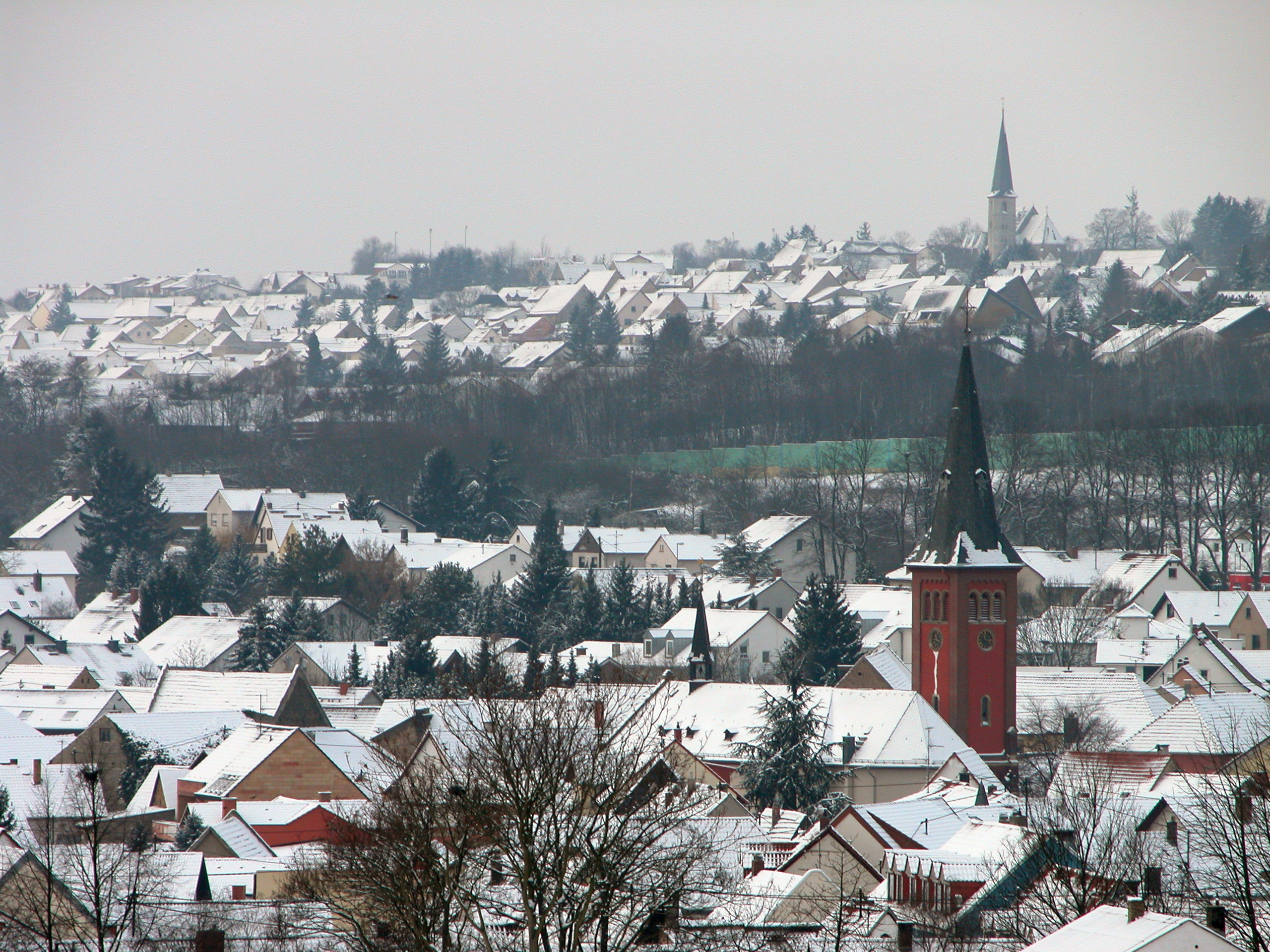
Klein-Winternheim

The municipality's economy was long dominated by winegrowing and fruit growing. Since the state capital is nearby, however, many commercial businesses have also been drawn to the municipal area.

=== Transport ===
- The municipality lies right near the Autobahn A 63 with its Klein-Winternheim (3) interchange.
- The Deutsche Bahn railway station Klein Winternheim-Ober Olm is in the community (Alzey–Mainz line).
