= Bundesautobahn 63 =

Federal motorway in Germany

A 63
- Bundesautobahn 63
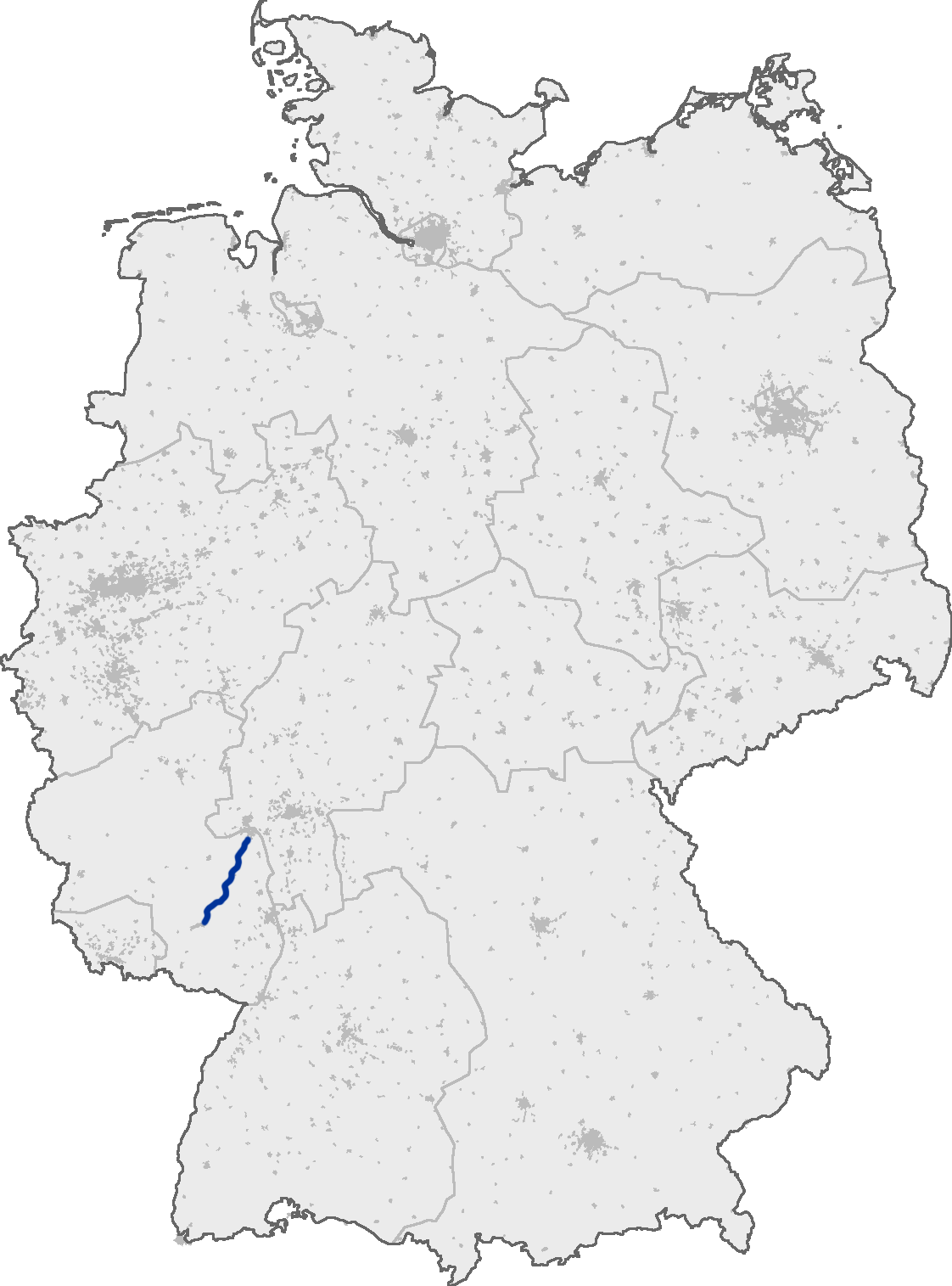

Route information
- Length: 73 km (45 mi)

Major junctions
- North end: Bundesautobahn 60 in Mainz
- South end: Bundesautobahn 6 in kaiserslautern

Location
- Country: Germany
- States: Rhineland-Palatinate

Highway system
- Roads in Germany; Autobahns; List; Federal; List; State; E-roads
| ← A 62 | → A 64 |

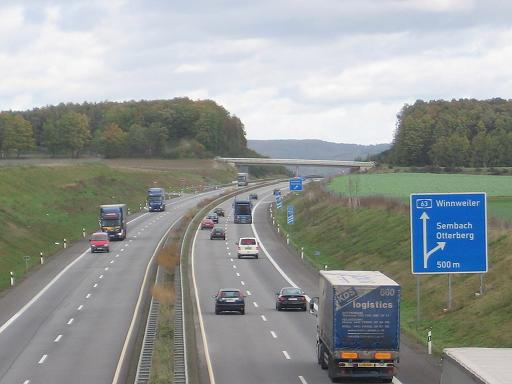
This photo is of Autobahn A 63 Kaiserslautern direction Mainz at the Sembach exit

Bundesautobahn 63 (translates from German as Federal Motorway 63, short form Autobahn 63, abbreviated as BAB 63 or A 63) is an autobahn in southwestern Germany. It connects the Mainz area to Kaiserslautern and the A 6 and is therefore an important connection between the Rhine/Main and the Saar areas. It was constructed during the 1980/90s and finished in 2004 (22 years ago): last section Sembach to Kaiserslautern.

Historically an uninterrupted Autobahn, one final 10-kilometre (6.2 mi) section was added between Sembach and Kaiserslautern at the current site of the Dreieck Kaiserslautern/KL-Zentrum Ausfahrt. This relieved the heavy traffic on the two lane Bundesstraße 40.

== Exit list ==
Legend:

- I/C - Interchange, I/S - Intersection, RSA - Rest and service area, OBR - Overhead bridge restaurant, R/R - Restaurant and rest plaza, L/B - Layby, V/P - Vista point, TN - tunnel, T/P - Toll plaza, BR - Bridge
- C - Cloverleaf, S - Stack, T-A - Trumpet-A, T-B - Trumpet-B, DT - Directional-T/Y, SDT - Semi-Directional-T/Y, P-Y - Partial-Y, D - Diamond, P-C - Partial cloverleaf, D-D - Diverging diamond, D-R - Direct ramp

| km | Exit | Name | Destinations | Notes |
|---|---|---|---|---|
| | (2) | Mainz-Süd 4-way interchange A 60, connection to B 40 | | |
| | (3) | Klein-Winternheim | | |
| | (4) | Nieder-Olm | | |
| | (5) | Saulheim | | |
| | (6) | Wörrstadt B 420 | | |
| | (7) | Biebelnheim | | |
| | (8) | Alzey 4-way interchange A 61 | | |
| | (9) | Erbes-Büdesheim | | |
| | | Viaduct Weinheim 1,300 m | | |
| | (10) | Freimersheim | | |
| | | Rest area Heubergerhof | | |
| | (11) | Kirchheimbolanden | | |
| | | Albisheim (planned) | | |
| | (12) | Göllheim | | |
| | | Umbau als: parking area | | |
| | | Rest area Donnersberg (planned) | | |
| | | Viaduct Langmeiler Senke 205 m | | |
| | | Viaduct Langmeil 276 m | | |
| | (13) | Winnweiler B 48 | | |
| | | Lohnsbachtalbrücke 271 m | | |
| | | Viaduct Lanzenbachtal 250 m | | |
| | | Viaduct Baalborner Wasser 250 m | | |
| | (14) | Sembach | | |
| | | Viaduct 100 m | | |
| | | Viaduct Eselsbachtal 230 m | | |
| | (15) | Kaiserslautern | | |
| | (16) | Kaiserslautern 3-way interchange A 6 | | |
