= Bechtolsheim =

- Municipality
- Coat of arms

- Location of Bechtolsheim within Alzey-Worms district
- Interactive map of Bechtolsheim
- Location within Germany Location within Rhineland-Palatinate
- Coordinates: 49°48′15″N 8°11′38″E
- Country: Germany
- State: Rhineland-Palatinate
- District: Alzey-Worms
- Municipal assoc.: Alzey-Land

Government
  - Mayor (2019–24): Dieter Mann (CDU)

Area
  - Total: 10.66 km^{2} (4.12 sq mi)
- Elevation: 150 m (490 ft)

Population (2025-12-31)
  - Total: 1,799
  - Density: 168.8/km^{2} (437.1/sq mi)
- Time zone: UTC+01:00 (CET)
  - Summer (DST): UTC+02:00 (CEST)
- Postal codes: 55234
- Dialling codes: 06733
- Vehicle registration: AZ
- Website: www.gemeinde-bechtolsheim.de

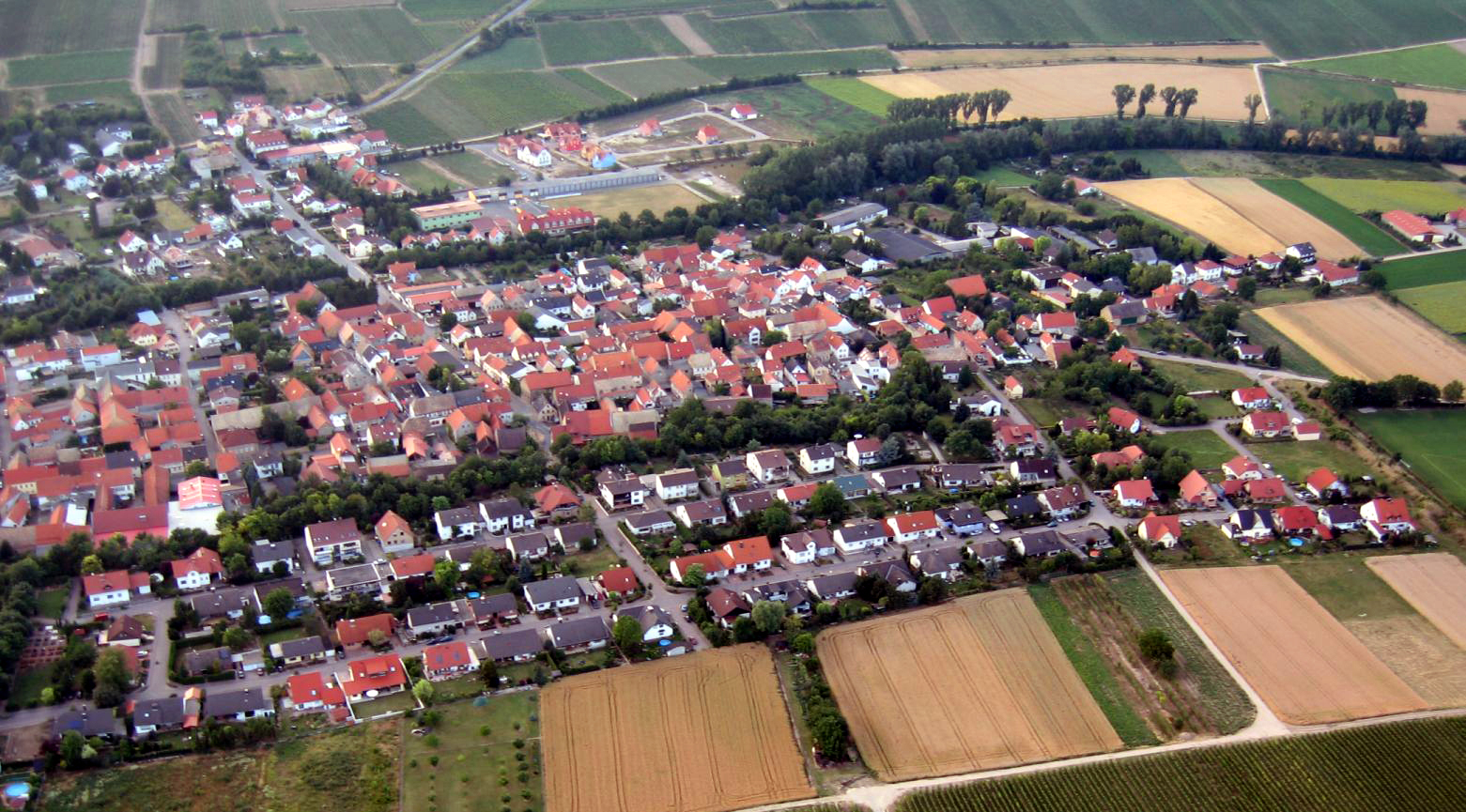
Aerial view of Bechtolsheim taken from a paramotor on 9 July 2005.

Bechtolsheim (Literally Bechtol's Home) is an Ortsgemeinde – a municipality belonging to a Verbandsgemeinde, a kind of collective municipality – in the Alzey-Worms district in Rhineland-Palatinate, Germany. It belongs to the Verbandsgemeinde of Alzey-Land, whose seat is in Alzey.

== Geography ==
=== Location ===
The municipality lies on the Selz, which here snakes along the Petersberg (mountain), at whose foot the municipality is found. The nearest towns are Alzey, with its dual administrative functions of district and Verbandsgemeinde seat, and Wörrstadt, roughly 10 km away. The state capital of Mainz, 30 km away, can be reached most quickly on Autobahn A 63.

As a winegrowing centre, Bechtolsheim lies in Germany's biggest winegrowing district and in the middle of the Rheinhessen wine region.

The municipal area covers 1 065 ha, of which 300 ha is planted with grapevines.

=== Neighbouring municipalities ===
The municipality's nearest neighbours are Biebelnheim (1 km) and Gau-Odernheim (1.5 km). After these come Gabsheim and Undenheim. With Weinolsheim there is a common municipal limit, but aside from paths across the countryside, there is no road link.

== History ==
=== New Stone Age ===
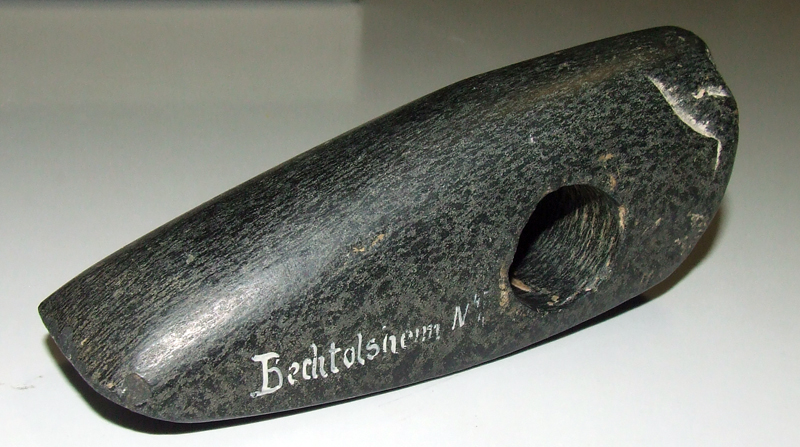
Stone axehead found near Bechtolsheim.

In the early 20th century, at what are now Bechtolsheim's limits with Biebelnheim and Gabsheim, a stone axehead from the New Stone Age was found. On 7 February 1962, a skeleton was discovered in the form of a seated burial.

=== Roman times ===
Four Roman villas have been unearthed. Coins from Marcus Aurelius’s and Constantine the Great’s time with Emperor Licinius’s effigy, a coin of Roman Empress Faustina, a little clay lamp with the potter's mark Attus-a and a waterpipe, which could be Roman, have been found. It is hence plain to see that settlements had arisen here by the time between AD 260 and 400.

=== First documentary mention ===
Bechtolsheim had its first documentary mention in 766 on the occasion of the donation of a vineyard to Lorsch Abbey. At that time, the village was variously named Bertolfsheim, Bertolvesheim and Bertolfesheim. In 793, it was called Beralfesheim, in 798 Beratwolfesheim and in 800 Badolfesheim.

On 25 December 1250, King William II of Holland moved into Bechtolsheim “with great magnificence” and took up positions with his troops against Conrad IV, whose armies lay near Oppenheim. At the time, the place belonged to Werner IV of Bolanden, who had taken William's side. He was, however, vanquished by Conrad, and could only avert the sacking of his villages by ceding Bechtolsheim and Mommenheim to the Hohenfels sideline.

=== Bechtolsheim Freedom Letter and the time of joint holding ===
The Lords of Bolanden ceded their economic estate to their Hohenfels sideline. A further mention of Bechtolsheim is to be found in the Bechtolsheimer Freiheitsbrief (“Bechtolsheim Freedom Letter”) from Philip of Hohenfels the Elder in the foundation certificate of the joint holding, or Ganerbschaft, from 15 November 1270. Joint landholders in this arrangement, besides the Barons of Dalberg and the Chamberlains of Worms, were the Barons Knebel von Katzenelnbogen, Mauchenheim called Bechtolsheim, the Barons of Dienheim, the Counts of Hallberg, the Barons Sturmfeder von Oppenheim, the Barons of Wallbrunn and Count Beckers von Westerstetten. Appearing for the first time about 1407 was a Wilhelmum de Mauchenheim d[ictum] Bechtolsheim, that is to say a “Wilhelm from Mauchenheim called Bechtolsheim”.

Up to 17 knightly families were resident in the village. In the end it was ruled by fewer noble families, namely von Dalberg, Nebel, Knebel, Beckers, Dienheim, Nordeck, Wallbrunn, Partenheim and Quernheim. For the building of the Muttergotteskirche (“Mother of God Church”, the one mentioned earlier, used as a “simultaneous” church), Popes Nicholas IV in 1292, Boniface VIII in 1313 and Benedict XII in 1341 published letters of indulgence, which can still be found in the church archives, and which show that half a century was spent building the church.

It was given the name of the great Mother of God Church, Ecclesia Major, B. M. V. (for Beatae Mariae Virginis, or “of the Blessed Virgin Mary”). It had many endowed altars at which the nobles exercised the right of presentation. The resident and regional nobles chose it as their burial site.

=== French Republic to German Empire ===
Between 1792 and 1814 Bechtolsheim belonged to the Department of Mont-Tonnerre (or Donnersberg in German). Thereafter it was briefly ruled by the “Imperial-Royal Austrian and Royal Bavarian Civil Administration of Kreuznach”, and then from 1815 by the Grand Duchy of Hesse in the newly created province of Rhenish Hesse (Rheinhessen). On 28 September 1896 the railway station on the Alzey–Bodenheim line was opened. On the night of 1 August 1904, the village's belltower next to the simultaneous church burnt down after a lightning strike. The permanent water supply through watermains was ensured in 1906 with the Wasserzweckverband Rhein-Selz-Gebiet (“Rhine-Selz Area Water Purpose Association”), founded with neighbouring municipalities. After the First World War, Bechtolsheim belonged to the People's State of Hesse beginning in 1918. In 1937, the Province of Rhenish Hesse was abolished, and until the end of the Second World War, the municipality belonged to the district of Oppenheim or Alzey. On 20 March 1945, towards 16:00, United States troops occupied the village.

=== Rhineland-Palatinate and Federal Republic of Germany ===
At first Bechtolsheim belonged to the French Zone of Occupation and there became, as part of the Regierungsbezirk of Rheinhessen (Rhenish Hesse), part of the new state of Rhineland-Palatinate in Alzey-Worms district. With the creation of Verbandsgemeinden in Rhineland-Palatinate in 1969 and 1970, some of the administration was yielded to the Verbandsgemeinde of Alzey-Land.

=== Religion ===
As at 31 December 2008, among inhabitants whose main dwelling is in Bechtolsheim, more than 53% are Evangelical Christians and more than 26% are Roman Catholic. More than 16% have no religious persuasion. The rest of the inhabitants, roughly 5%, are split among various religious affiliations.

Both Christian denominations are equally entitled to use the simultaneous church. The Catholic parish belongs to the Catholic Deaconry of Alzey – Gau-Bickelheim, in the Roman Catholic Diocese of Mainz, while the Evangelical parish belongs to the Evangelical Church in Hesse and Nassau. The Evangelical parish office in Bechtolsheim also oversees the parishes in Biebelnheim, Ensheim and Spiesheim. The Catholic parish belongs, together with Biebelnheim to the Gau-Odernheim parish office.

From the 18th century through to the mid-1930s there was a small Jewish community. For institutions the Jews had a synagogue or prayer room which is believed to have been set up in an existing building in 1845, and which served as the Jewish community's religious centre until some time between 1900 and 1910. Owing to the sharp drop in the Jewish population the synagogue was closed, and in 1925, the run down building was torn down in 1925. As well as a synagogue, there were a yeshiva and a mikveh. The dead were buried in the Jewish graveyard within Gau-Odernheim's municipal limits on a ridge at the Petersberg (mountain).

- 1804 39 Jewish inhabitants
- 1808 12 Jewish households
- 1824 66 Jewish inhabitants
- 1830 66 Jewish inhabitants
- 1855 80 Jewish inhabitants
- 1861 46 Jewish inhabitants
- 1900 19 Jewish inhabitants
- 1905 19–20 Jewish inhabitants (1.8% of a total population of 1134)
- 1924 16 Jewish inhabitants
- 1933 10 Jewish inhabitants

After 1933, almost all the Jewish inhabitants either pulled out or emigrated in the face of systematic stripping of their rights and reprisals.

=== Population development ===
The figures for the number of inhabitants whose main residence is in Bechtolsheim, each time at 31 December unless otherwise stated, is as follows:

1815:	879
1835:	1,383
1871:	1,174
1905:	1,134
1939:	1,185
1950:	1,432
1961:	1,385
1970:	1,407
1972:	1,426
1987:	1,394
1991:	1,396
30 June 2005:	1,480
2005:	1,462
2006:	1,501
2007:	1,543
30 June 2008:	1,551

== Politics ==
=== Municipal council ===
From the first election on 15 September 1946, the council was made up of 15 council members. Since 1989, that number was raised by one. Moreover, there is also an honorary mayor who serves as chairman.

The municipal election held on 7 June 2009 yielded the following results:

Municipal election of	SPD	CDU	FWG	Total
7 June 2009	6	3	7 (FWG Bechtolsheim)	16 seats
2004	5	2	9 (FWG Bechtolsheim)	16 seats
1999	?	?	?	16 seats
1994	?	?	?	16 seats
1989	?	?	? (WG Oehlhof)	16 seats
1984	?	?	? (WG Oehlhof)	15 seats
1979	?	?	? (WG Oehlhof)	15 seats
1974	?	?	? (WG Oehlhof)	15 seats
1969	4	3	8 (WG Oehlhof)	15 seats
1964	?	?	?	15 seats
1960	?	?	?	15 seats
1956	?	?	?	15 seats
1952	?	?	?	15 seats
1948	?	?	?	15 seats
15 September 1946	?	?	?	15 seats

The number of council members between 1919 and 1946 was as follows

- 1919–1922: 12 members
- 1923–1926: 11 members
- 1926–1929: 12 members
- 1929–1933: 11 members
- 1933–1945: 14 members (two members were excluded in July 1933 and replaced by others)
- 1945–1946: 9 members (as municipal committee)

Between 1919 and 1936, there was each time one municipal deputy, whereafter there were always two.

=== Mayors ===
In the time of joint holding (Ganerbschaft), there was a so-called Schultheiß (roughly, “reeve” or “sheriff”). The following list is incomplete:

- Nichel Radan and Conrad Stantharte, about 1300
- Johann von Bechtolsheim and his brother Wilderich, about 1350
- Thomas Kempe, 1487
- Thomas Cemppe, 1488
- Groll, 1593 and 1595
- Wilhelm Ungeradt, 1610
- Joh. Schumann, 1628
- Philipp Nau, 1699
- Johann Fischer, 1705
- ? Schmidt, 18th century
- ? Theis, 18th century

From 1798, Bechtolsheim belonged to the French First Republic and more specifically to the Canton de Wörrstadt in the Arrondissement communal de Mayence (Mayence is the French name for Mainz) in the Department of Mont-Tonnerre (or Donnersberg in German). Between 1798 and 1814 there was therefore a maire (French for “mayor”). After being assigned to the Grand Duchy of Hesse, the municipal head was ever after a Bürgermeister (German for “mayor”).

1. Jean Böhm (1798–1812), likewise responsible for Biebelnheim
2. Pierre/Peter Baum (1812–1822), likewise responsible for Biebelnheim
3. ? Schuckmann (1822–1831), beginning here responsible only for Bechtolsheim
4. Baltasar Oehlhof (1831–1843)
5. Johann Best (1843–1849)
6. Baltasar Oehlhof (1849–1853)
7. Michael Köhler (1853–1874)
8. Peter Wirth (1874–1902)
9. Friedrich Schuckmann (1902–1933)
10. Johann Eger (1933–1934)
11. Heinrich Diel (1934–1945)
12. Johann Menges (1945–1951)
13. Theo Bretz (1951–1952)
14. Franz Mann (1952–1956)
15. Adam Schneider (1956–1960)
16. Erich Oehlhof (1960–1994) (Oehlhof Free Voters’ group)
17. Harald Kemptner (1994–2019) (SPD)
18. Dieter Mann (since 2019, CDU)

=== Coat of arms ===
==== Former coat of arms used until 1984 ====
Old arms used until 1984

Blazon (German): Gespalten von Silber und Schwarz, belegt mit einem roten Balken.

In English heraldic language, this might be rendered: Per pale argent and sable, a fess gules.

This escutcheon was handed down from a village court seal from 1590, two armorial reliefs at the town hall and a hand-drawn, official armorial page that came into being between 1790 and 1797.

Argent and sable (silver and black) were also the tinctures seen in the arms borne by the joint landholders, from 1270 the Barons of Dalberg, who built the church, the Barons of Sickingen and the Counts of Katzenelnbogen, and they thereby show the municipality's link with the old Ganerbenschaft quite clearly. The fess gules (red horizontal stripe) might clearly and vividly express, among other things, the link with the Ganerbschaft, and also the villagers’ oneness.

This coat of arms was, however, unapproved, and logos of varying shapes were used in the decades that were to come. A coat of arms was published in 1905 by Karl Johann Brilmayer. This was recorded thus: The village bore two coats of arms, the Rhenish Knighthood's and its own. This latter coat was party per pale (parted vertically down the middle) with the von Dalberg arms on the dexter (armsbearer's right, viewer's left) side and the von Knebel arms on the sinister (armsbearer's left, viewer's right) side. The Rhenish Knighthood's arms, charged with an eagle, a dragonslayer, a castle and a lion surmounted by a bend (with a diagonal stripe superimposed on him) on a quarterly escutcheon, was never Bechtolsheim's municipal coat of arms. The second coat of arms contains in simplified form on the dexter side the lilies of the Barons of Dalberg or Chaimberlains Knebel von Katzenelnbogen. Both families belonged to the Bechtolsheim Ganerbschaft, and along with the Barons of Mauchenheim, were the most important of the families belonging to it.

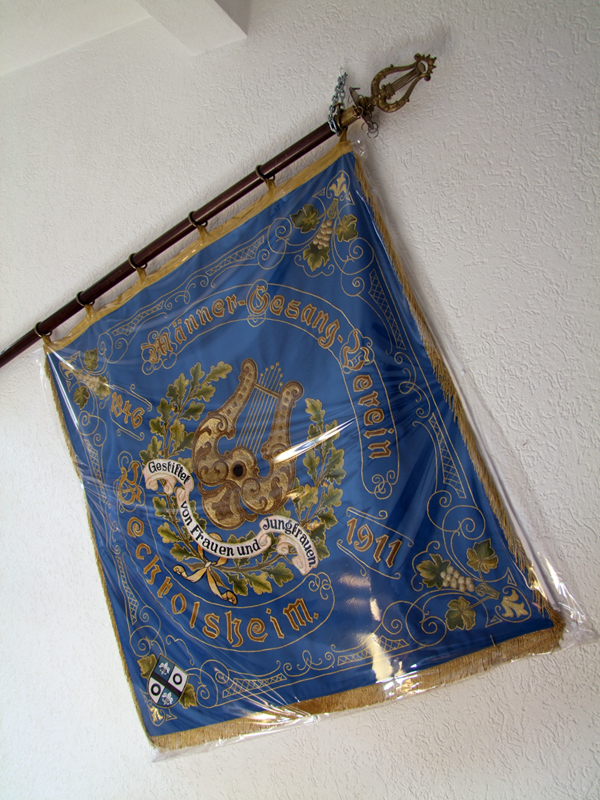
Flag for the Men's Singing Club's 1911 jubilee. The arms may be seen in the lower corner.

The divided shield with the Dalberg lilies and the Knebel von Katzenelnbogen insignia was commonly regarded in Bechtolsheim as the municipality's arms.

==== Approved coat of arms used since 1984 ====
New coat of arms as of 1984

On 31 January 1984, the municipality was granted a coat of arms, whose German blazon reads as follows: Von Blau, darin je eine silberne Lilie, und Silber, darin je ein schwarzer Ring, geviert, belegt mit einem schwarzen Balken.

In English heraldic language, this might be rendered: Quarterly surmounted by a fess sable, first and fourth azure a fleur-de-lis argent, second and third argent an annulet of the first.

== Culture and sightseeing ==
=== Theatre ===
- Theater- und Carnevalverein Bechtolsheim e.V. (theatre and carnival club), since 1892

=== Music ===
- Musikzug der Freiwilligen Feuerwehr (volunteer fire brigade's musical parade), since 1962

=== Buildings ===
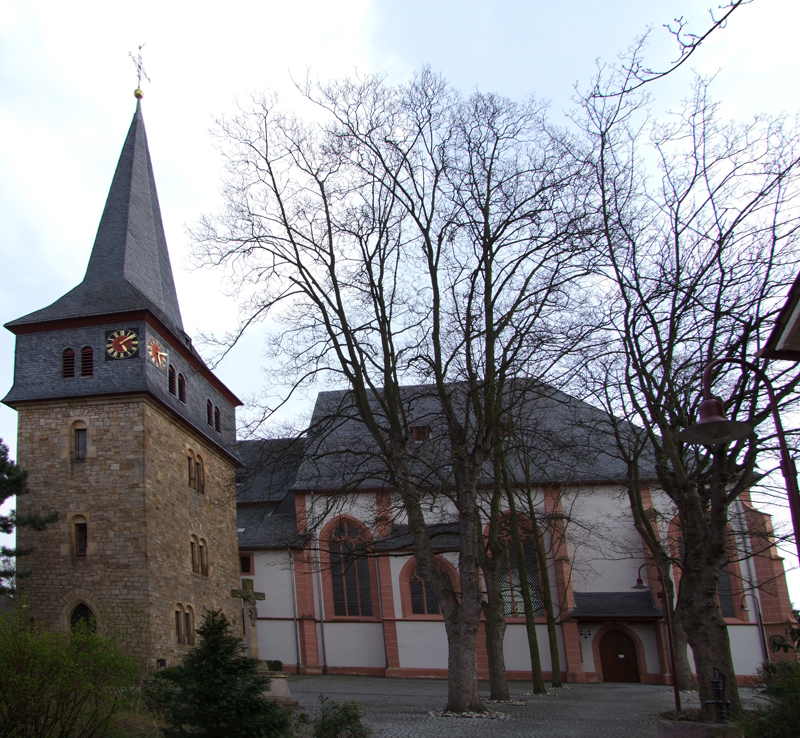
"Simultaneous" church dates from 1492.

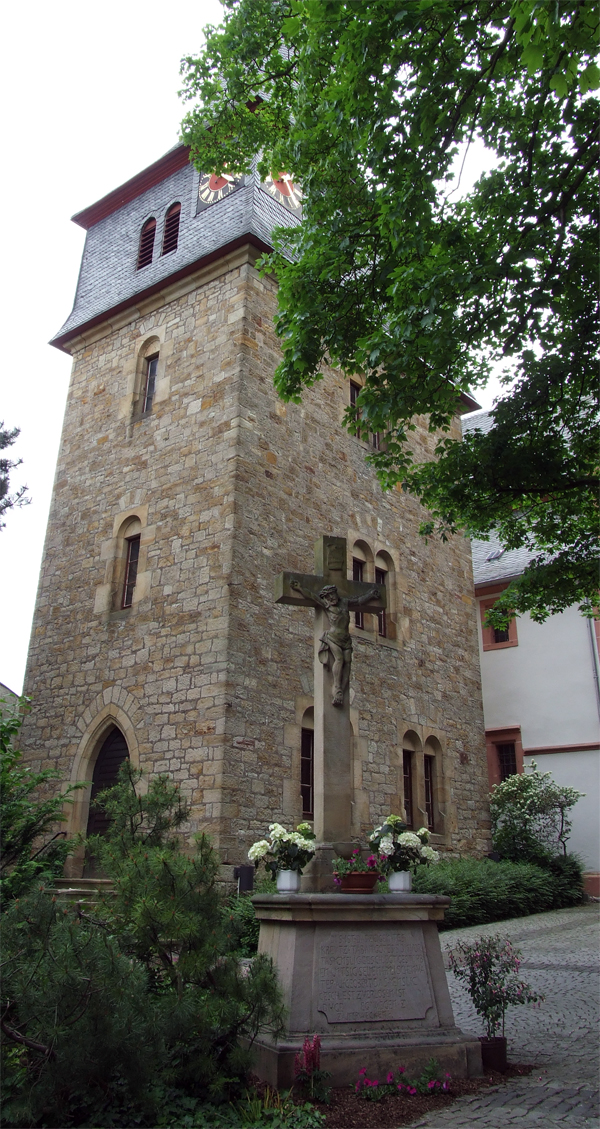
Belltower at the simultaneous church and Late Baroque graveyard cross with Christ's body

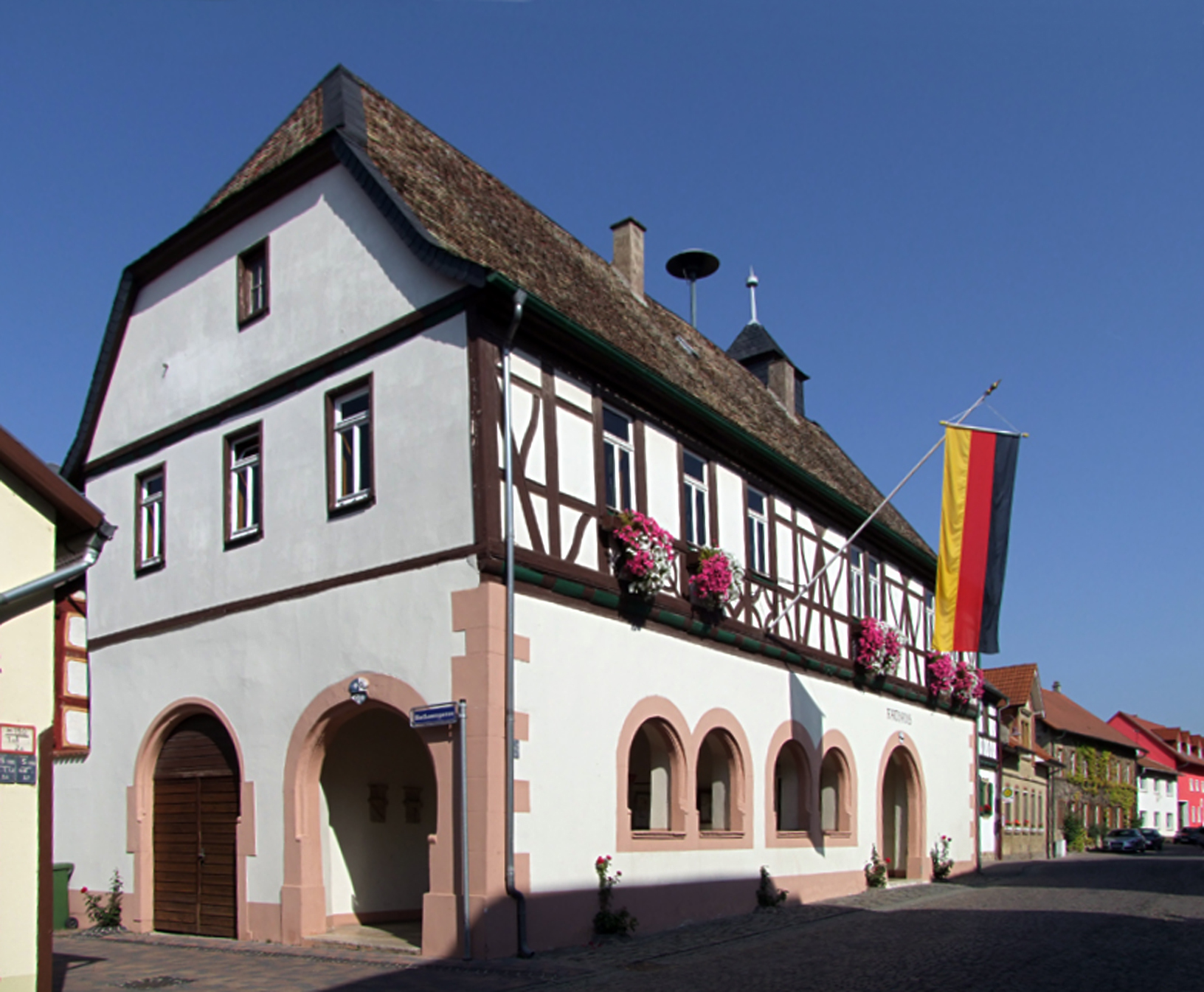
Town hall

In the Nachrichtliches Verzeichnis der Kulturdenkmäler Rheinland-Pfalz für den Landkreis Alzey-Worms (“News Directory of Rhineland-Palatinate Cultural Monuments for the District of Alzey-Worms”) from the Generaldirektion Kulturelles Erbe (“General Directorate for Cultural Heritage Rhineland-Palatinate”), the following buildings and monuments in Bechtolsheim are listed:

- Fortifications
  - A piece of the former village fortification, remnants of wall and double ditch, the typical impenetrable hedgerows (Gebück), today converted into a pedestrian bypass around the village centre. Remnants of the mediaeval wall ditch fortification with Gebück.
  - former village fortification, mediaeval wall ditch fortification on the village's southeast outskirts.
- Village centre
  - Langgasse (“Long Lane”) between the intersection with Dolgesheimer Straße in the north and Sulzheimer Straße in the south, typical Rhenish-Hessian house and farm types from the 17th to the 20th century, including the street itself with historic paving. Called Denkmalzone Langgasse (“Long Lane Monument Zone”).
    - Three-naved Late Gothic “Shared church” church, Saint Mary's and Saint Christopher's (Simultankirche St. Maria und St. Christopherus) with Late Gothic decorated pews and a Stumm organ.
    - Bechtolsheim Belltower, at the simultaneous church.
    - Late Baroque graveyard cross with Christ's body, 1755, at the simultaneous church.
    - Langgasse 11: former Evangelical school, late Classicist plastered building, 1854.
    - Langgasse 17: former Catholic school, late Classicist plastered building, mid 19th century.
    - Langgasse 18: Evangelical parsonage, from the 18th century with memorial plaque to the Reverend Wilhelm Hoffmann, who became well known for his contributions to Rhenish-Hessian folklore.
    - Langgasse 28: Baroque timber-frame house, partly solid, early 18th century.
    - Langgasse 29: Baroque timber-frame house, partly solid, 18th century, gateway from early half of 19th century.
    - Langgasse 44: Town hall from 1592 with arcades on the south side and a half-hipped roof, partly timber framing, works from the Renaissance, spolia from the 12th and 16th to 18th centuries.
    - Langgasse 53: Late Baroque house, partly timber framing, 1795
    - Langgasse 61: former keystone, 1610
    - (opposite) Langgasse 93: wayside cross, Baroque, 1740
  - Section of an old graveyard, gravestones, about 1870-1940, veterans’ graves 1912 on.
  - Bahnhofstraße: former railway station, two-part Late Gründerzeit clinker brick building, plank goods shed, about 1826
  - Schlossgasse 8: Hakenhof; Late Baroque house, partly timber framing, about 1800
  - Schlossgasse 10: Renaissance inscription plaque, 1580 (endower's plaque for the moated castle of the Lords of Dalberg).
  - Sulzheimer Straße 6: timber-frame house, partly solid, early half of 18th century, gateway from early half of 19th century.
  - Sulzheimer Straße 20: timber-frame house, mid 18th century.
  - Sulzheimer Straße 23: relief stone, 17th/18th century.
  - Sulzheimer Straße 40: farmstead; Baroque timber-frame house, partly solid, 18th century.
- Outskirts
  - Bechtolsheim Cellular Transmission Tower - only wooden cellphone transmission tower in Germany
- Gemarkung Laimen
  - Water cistern; Art Nouveau-type building, bossed blocks made of Flonheim sandstone, 1906

=== Sport ===
- Sportverein Bechtolsheim e.V. (SVB) (sport club)

At the municipality’s disposal are a so-called sport centre with two football pitches (one turf, the other hard) and a sport hall with a clubhouse, and two tennis courts with artificial turf in the club’s old new development area.

- Schützenverein Petersberg Bechtolsheim e.V. (shooting club)

The club’s shooting facility can be found on the road from Gau-Odernheim to Undenheim.

- Freizeitsportverein Bechtolsheim (sport club)

Moreover, the municipality also has the “Bechtolsheim Leisure Sport Club”, which split from the SVB in 1982.

=== Regular events ===
- Yearly kermis (church consecration festival, locally known as the Kerb or Kerwe) on the last weekend in August

Since 1985, the kermis has been regularly held in Bechtolsheim. It is organized and run by the municipality’s 20-year-old Kerbeborsch and Kerbemäd (dialectal German for “kermis lads” and “kermis lasses”)
The Kerbeborsch put the kermis tree (Kerbebaum – rather like a Maypole) up with the kermis wreath (Kerbekranz), with the typical Rhenish-Hessian dishes Weck, Worscht un Woi (Brötchen, Wurst und Wein in Standard High German, or “buns, sausage and wine”), and also Brezel. Then, the festival starts with the call Wem geheert die Kerb? (“To whom does the kermis belong?”), answered with UNSER (“Ours”), and with the kermis dance. The Kerbejahrgang (the 20-year-old “lads” and “lasses”) always gives the yearly kermis a particular motto.

== Economy and infrastructure ==
=== Established businesses ===
The municipality's economy is based mainly on winegrowing and agriculture. There are at least 13 wineries as well as a winemaking cooperative. Furthermore, the municipality is home to the kitchens of a medium-sized bakery business that supplies its own two shops in Bechtolsheim and Gau-Odernheim and also the travelling sales booths. The shop in Bechtolsheim is also a small supermarket, café and Toto Lotto centre. Through the café and the bakery, the Landmarkt (“country market”) is open the whole week.

Further businesses in town are three automotive workshops, a discount filling station, an agricultural supply dealership, a carpentry shop, a fruitgrowing operation, a beekeeper, three hairdresser's shops, a dentistry practice and other, smaller service businesses.

Until the turn of the century, the Volksbank Wörrstadt e.G. (now known as the Volksbank Alzey e.G.) and the Kreissparkasse Alzey (district savings bank) each had a branch in Bechtolsheim. After they both closed, the savings bank's premises were converted into a self-service kiosk with a transfer terminal for both banks including an account statement printer, and automated teller machines. In the Volksbank’s building, flats are now to be found. Only the entrance door gives any hint that it was once a bank.

Even the postal centre (Poststelle – not a full post office, but run by postal employees), in existence in 1995 and 1996 was first converted into a postal agency (Postagentur – an operation not run by postal employees) with two agents, and then a few years later it was dissolved altogether. The nearest postal agency can now be found in Gau-Odernheim.

=== Transport ===
Through the municipality runs a Kreisstraße (district road). The nearest Autobahn is the A 63 about 5 km away, accessible through the Biebelnheim interchange. Local public transport is provided by bus links to Alzey and Mainz run by Omnibusverkehr Rhein-Nahe (ORN).

Between 1896 and 31 May 1985, there was a railway station in the municipality on the line running between Bodenheim and Alzey. Thereafter, the line was used only for goods transport, mainly for the sugar beet harvest. In 1995 came permanent closure, and work was begun to tear the tracks up.

=== Media ===
Since 1986, a small group has been publishing a newspaper, the so-called Bechtolsheimer Ortsschelle. The paper appears monthly and contains mainly the protocols of past municipal council meetings, as well as club news and information on events. It is financed by advertising by local businesses. The circulation in 2008 was 350, and the price was €1.

=== Public institutions ===
- Evangelical kindergarten
- Bechtolsheim Volunteer Fire Brigade, since 1872

=== Education ===
- The municipality has one primary school, which also takes school-age children from the neighbouring municipality of Biebelnheim. Secondary schools are to be found in Gau-Odernheim, Alzey and Wörrstadt.
- The Evangelical church maintains a library at its youth centre.

=== Clubs ===
- Heimatverein Bechtolsheim e.V. (local history)
- Landfrauenverein (countrywomen)
- Männerballett „Die Scheinheiligen Mönche“ (men's ballet)
- Motorradclub – MCB (motorcycles)
- Theater- und Carnevalsverein Bechtolsheim – TCVB (theatre and carnival)
