= Gau-Odernheim =

- Municipality
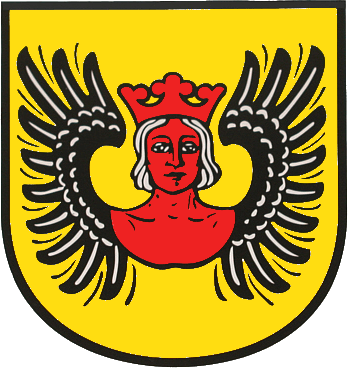
- Coat of arms

- Location of Gau-Odernheim within Alzey-Worms district
- Interactive map of Gau-Odernheim
- Location within Germany Location within Rhineland-Palatinate
- Coordinates: 49°47′5″N 8°11′39″E
- Country: Germany
- State: Rhineland-Palatinate
- District: Alzey-Worms
- Municipal assoc.: Alzey-Land
- Subdivisions: Gau-Odernheim and Gau-Köngernheim

Government
  - Mayor (2019–24): Heiner Illing (SPD)

Area
  - Total: 18.27 km^{2} (7.05 sq mi)
- Elevation: 148 m (486 ft)

Population (2025-12-31)
  - Total: 4,025
  - Density: 220.3/km^{2} (570.6/sq mi)
- Time zone: UTC+01:00 (CET)
  - Summer (DST): UTC+02:00 (CEST)
- Postal codes: 55239
- Dialling codes: 06733
- Vehicle registration: AZ
- Website: www.gau-odernheim.de

Gau-Odernheim (until 1896 simply Odernheim) is an Ortsgemeinde – a municipality belonging to a Verbandsgemeinde, a kind of collective municipality – in the Alzey-Worms district in Rhineland-Palatinate, Germany.

== Geography ==
=== Location ===
The municipality lies in Rhenish Hesse and belongs to the Verbandsgemeinde of Alzey-Land, whose seat is in Alzey.

Gau-Odernheim lies on the little river Selz, which snakes its way along the Petersberg (mountain). The nearest towns are Alzey (8 km) with both the district and Verbandsgemeinde seats, and Wörrstadt (12 km). The state capital Mainz, 30 km away, can be reached easily on the Autobahn A 63. As a winegrowing centre, Gau-Odernheim lies in Germany's biggest winegrowing district and in the middle of the Rheinhessen wine region. Because it is near the Frankfurt Rhine Main Region, the municipality is also a bedroom community and therefore has many new development areas and new citizens.

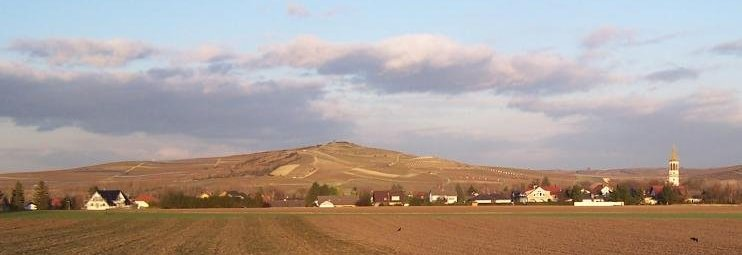
Gau-Odernheim with the Petersberg in the background

=== Neighbouring municipalities ===
Gau-Odernheim's neighbours are Bechtolsheim, Biebelnheim, Framersheim, Hillesheim and Dittelsheim-Heßloch.

=== Constituent communities ===
Gau-Odernheim has a main centre with the outlying centre (Ortsteil) of Gau-Köngernheim

== History ==
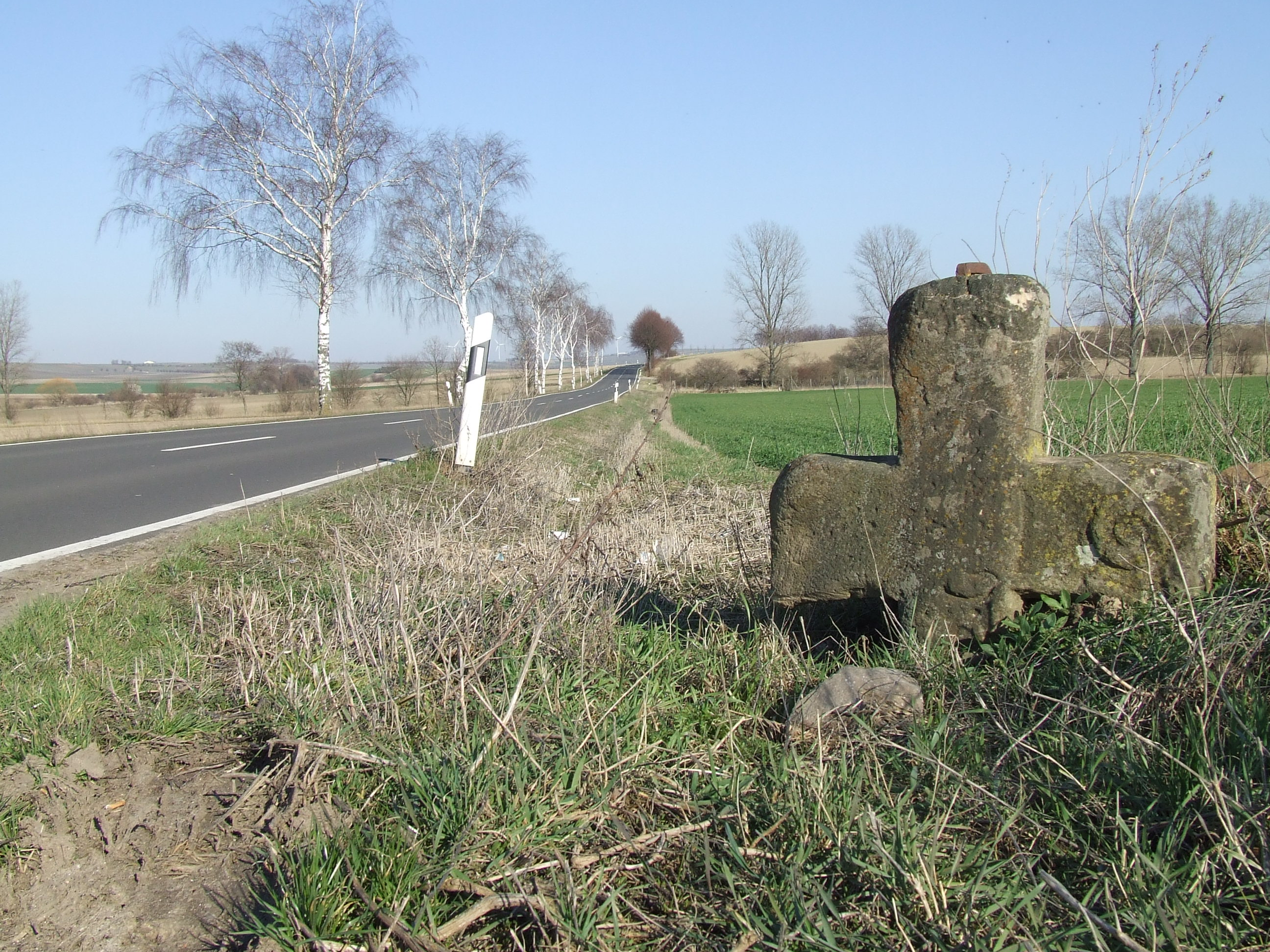
Ottenkreuz on the Deutsche Alleenstraße on the way to Hillesheim.

In the ninth century the relics of Rufus of Metz were transferred to the local church in the Roman Catholic Diocese of Mainz.

In 1268, the vast holdings owned by the Lords of Bolanden between the Donnersberg and the Rhine were shared out among offspring, among whom an open feud later broke out, which claimed some participants’ lives. At the battlefield near Ottenheim, as Gau-Odernheim was then known, at the boundary of the divided land, a so-called stone Sühnekreuz (“atonement cross”) was put up. In the Middle Ages, though, nobody wanted to have anything to do with an atonement cross; such a place was shunned and was eerie. Thus, the Ottenkreuz was eventually forgotten. Under the earth, bushes and thorny hedges it lay until those seeking it unearthed it at last. Until 2008, it could be seen on the right side of the road from Gau-Odernheim to Hillesheim; however, after a number of attempts had been made to steal the Ottenkreuz, it was secured, and beginning in 2010, those wishing to see it will be able to do so at the Gau-Odernheim town hall.

In 1286, Rudolf von Habsburg, the King of the Romans, granted Gau-Odernheim Imperial town freedoms. The master craftsman Erhart Falckener, who was known for his Late Gothic church furnishings, lived in Gau-Odernheim, according to a signature on a work from 1510. It is believed that he and his fellow craftsmen would have found ample work to do here, as on 1 August 1479, the whole village, but for six houses, burnt down. Sometime before 1731, the local lordship had passed to the Sturmfeder von Oppenweiler lordly family. Winegrowing was already being done in 850 on the Petersberg's south slopes.

When the railway was built in 1896, Odernheim had its name changed to Gau-Odernheim to avoid any confusion with Odernheim am Glan.

Gau-Odernheim was an early Rhenish-Hessian National Socialist hotbed. In 1938, the municipality prided itself in “having been the first place in Rhenish Hesse in which Adolf Hitler’s idea had already gained a foothold in the years 1923 and 1924, and wherefrom it was spread into the nearer and further environs”. As early as half a year before the Machtergreifung, the municipality made Adolf Hitler an honorary citizen.

Since 7 June 1969, the outlying centre of Gau-Köngernheim has been part of the municipality.

=== Gau-Köngernheim ===
Gau-Köngernheim had its first documentary mention in the 9th century in a donation of cropland in Cuningeroheim in 804 to Lorsch Abbey. Other forms of the name over the ages were Chuningernheim (1190), Kungernheim (1268), Kongernheim (1323) and Konigernheim (1464). To distinguish it from the other Köngernheim that lay just under 11 km away, it was called Bös-Köngernheim. In 1896 Gau-Köngernheim acquired its current name, the reason being that both municipalities were on the same railway line, which was dedicated that same year.

== Politics ==
=== Municipal council ===
The council is made up of 20 council members, who were elected at the municipal election held on 7 June 2009, and the honorary mayor as chairman.

The municipal election held on 7 June 2009 yielded the following results:

| | SPD | CDU | FWG | Total |
| 2009 | 12 | - | 8 | 20 seats |
| 2004 | 11 | 4 | 5 | 20 seats |

=== Mayors ===
- Heinrich Ritter (NSDAP) 1929–1933
- ...
- Karl Heinz Merker (SPD) (1984–2004)
- Bernd Westphal (SPD) (2004–†2013)
- Heiner Illing (SPD) (2013–present)

=== Coat of arms ===
The municipality's arms might be described thus: Or a king's head and chest affronty couped gules crowned of the same and crined argent, conjoined to the shoulders wings elevated sable.

The king's head and chest with wings are already seen in the municipality's oldest seal, dating from 1286. The charge remained essentially unchanged until the 17th century when it was replaced with the Imperial eagle, but in 1698, the old composition was restored, albeit this time with a female figure as a supporter behind the escutcheon, no longer seen in the current arms, which have been borne since 1961.

Although the coat of arms seen in this article shows the king with black hair (“crined sable”), the blazon given here indicates silver hair (“crined argent”). The arms shown on the municipality's own website, and at Heraldry of the World, show the king with silver hair.

=== Town partnerships ===
- Pulnoy, Meurthe-et-Moselle, France

Pulnoy lies near Nancy.

== Culture and sightseeing ==
=== Music ===
- Blasorchester 1985 e.V Gau-Odernheim (wind orchestra)
- Männergesangverein „Eintracht“ 1842/1920 e.V. (men's singing club)

=== Buildings ===
- The Stadtschreiberhaus (“Town Clerk’s House”) is one of the loveliest and best preserved timber-frame houses in Gau-Odernheim's old centre.
- The Gothic Gau-Odernheim Simultaneous Church (Simultankirche Gau-Odernheim) is walled off into two parts – one Catholic and the other Evangelical. The Evangelical parish uses the main nave whereas the Catholics hold their services in the chancel. The Catholic part is called Saint Rufus's Church (St. Rufus Kirche – after Rufus of Metz), and the Evangelical part is known as ehemalige Stadtkirche (“former town church”).
- The Gasthaus „Zur Krone“ – an inn – is likewise a well-preserved timber-frame house. It graces the Gau-Odernheimer Untermarkt (“Lower Market”). Up until only a few years ago, it was still possible to book guestrooms here. The times when it was once a real inn, though, are long gone.
- The Petersberghalle was built in 1990 as a multipurpose hall.
- Other noteworthy buildings are the old castle tower and the old school building.
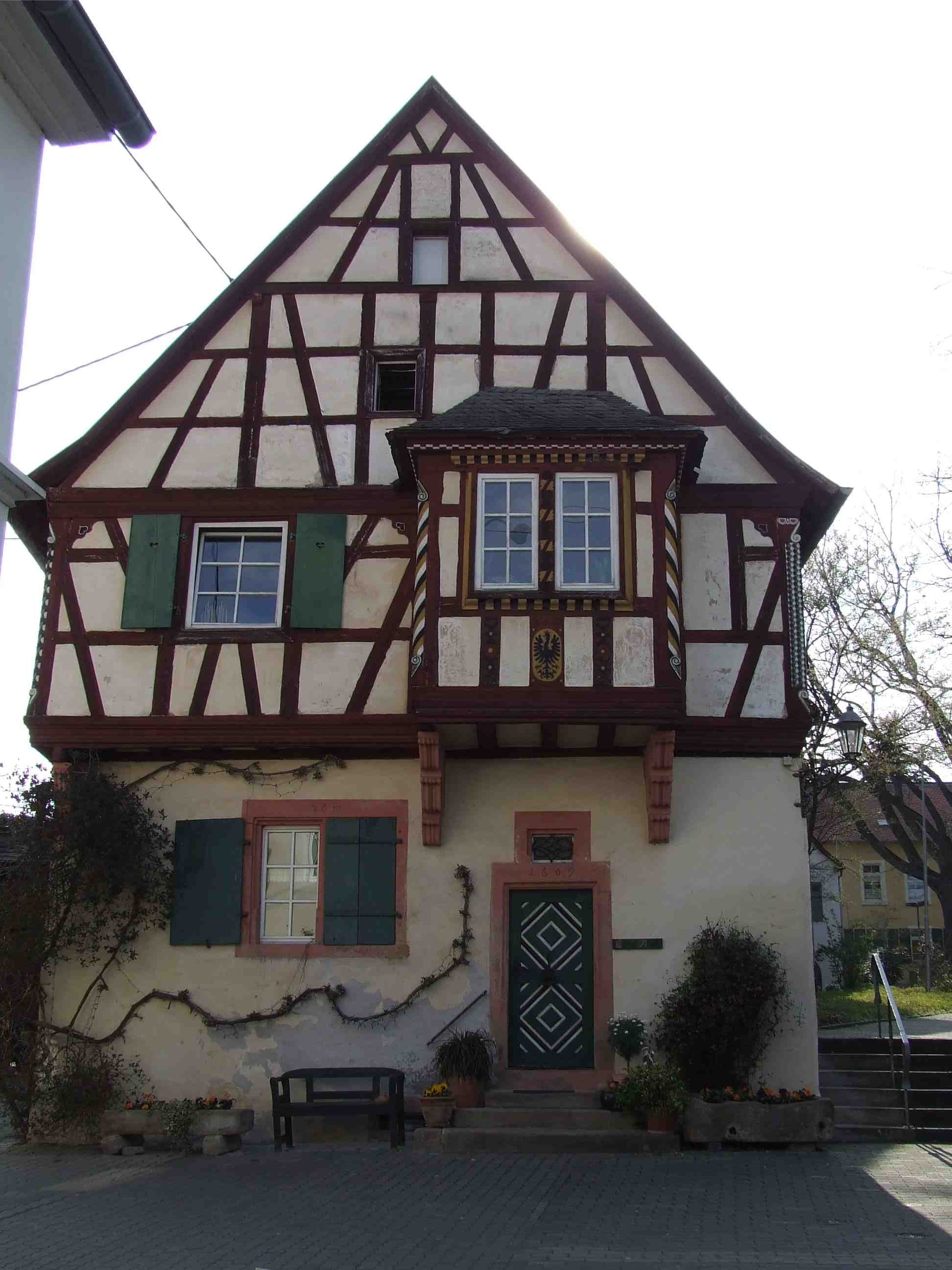
Stadtschreiberhaus

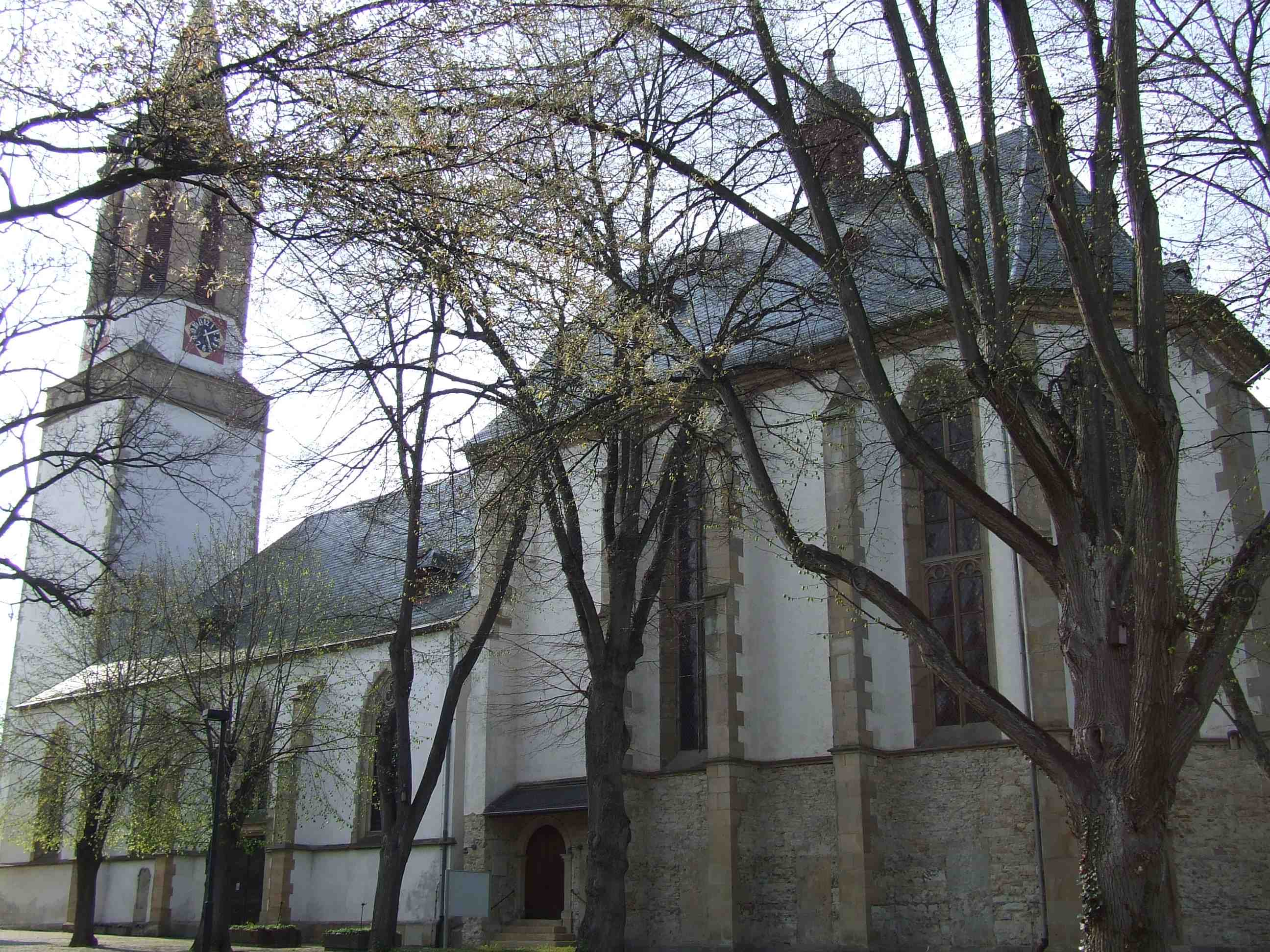
Simultaneous Church – left Evangelical, right Catholic

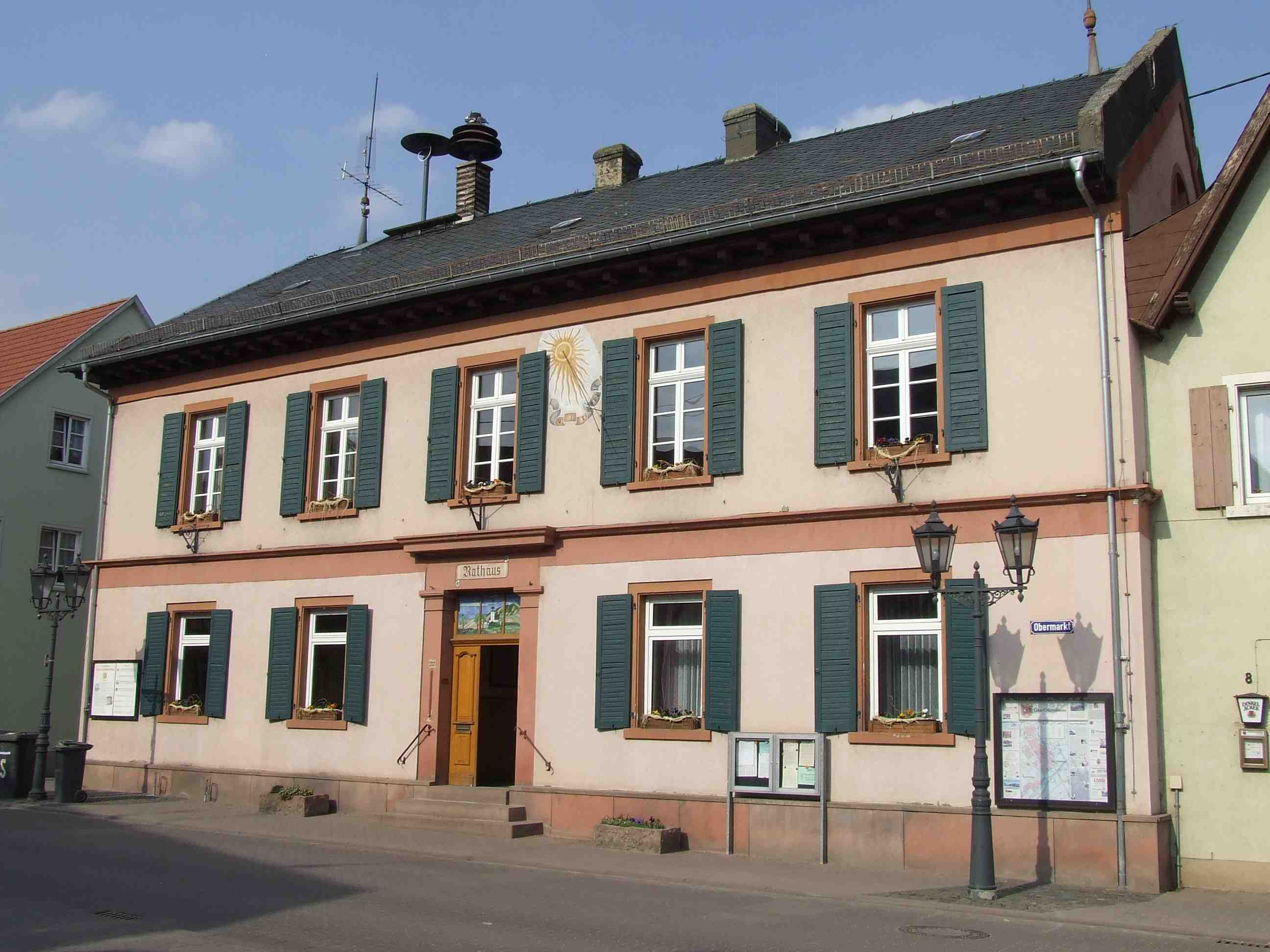
Gau-Odernheim town hall

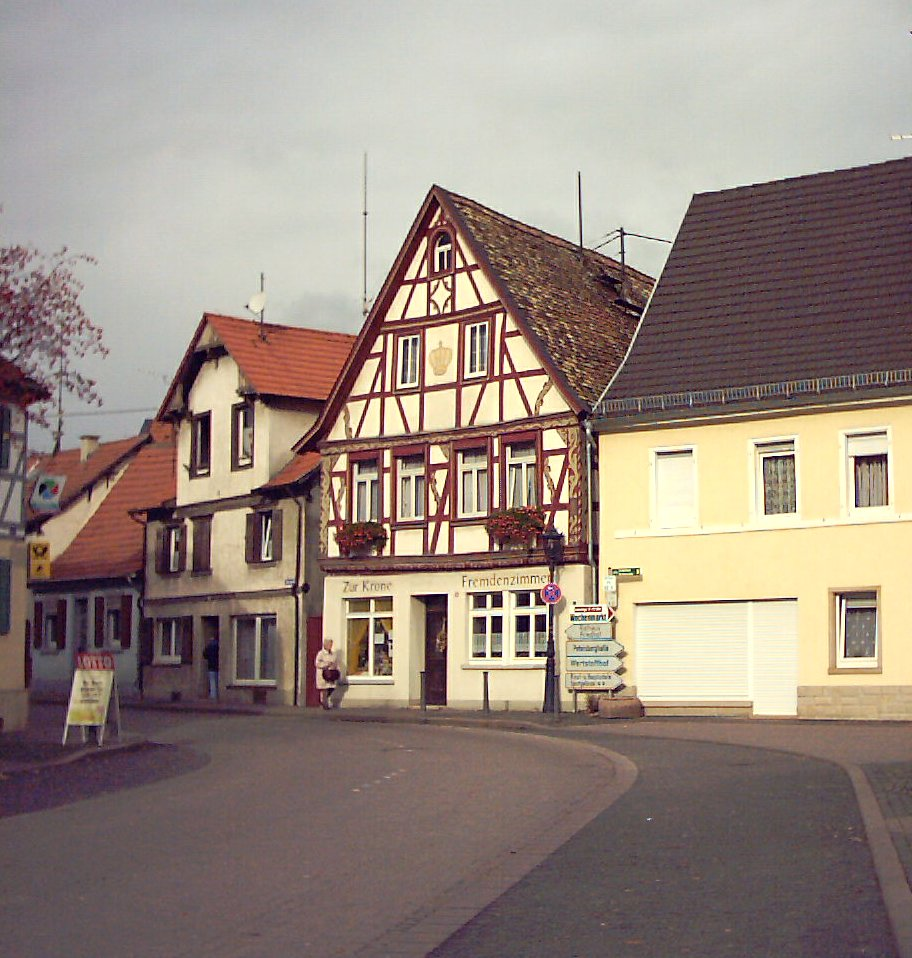
Gasthaus „Zur Krone“ in Gau-Odernheim

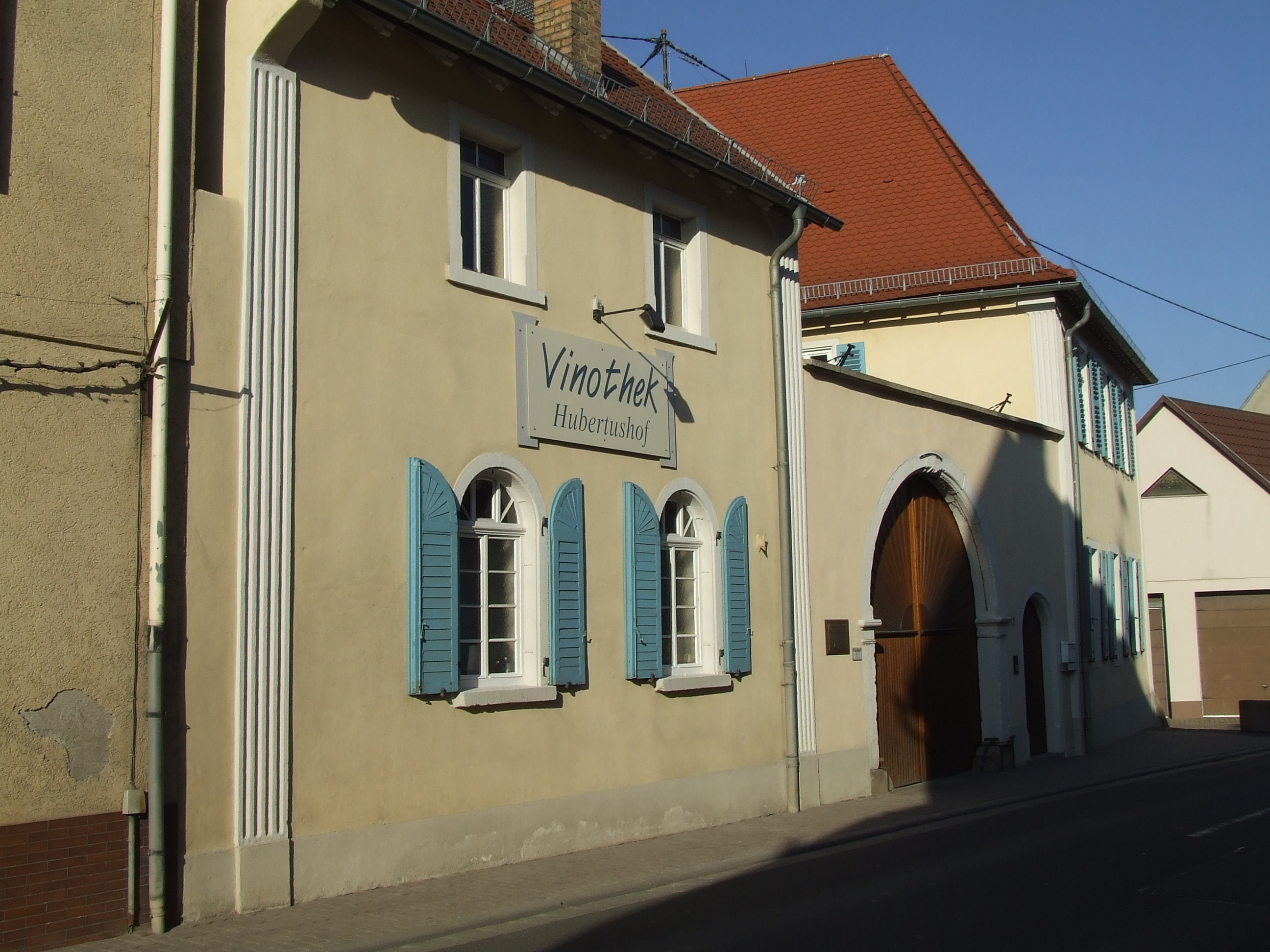
Vinothek Hubertushof ...

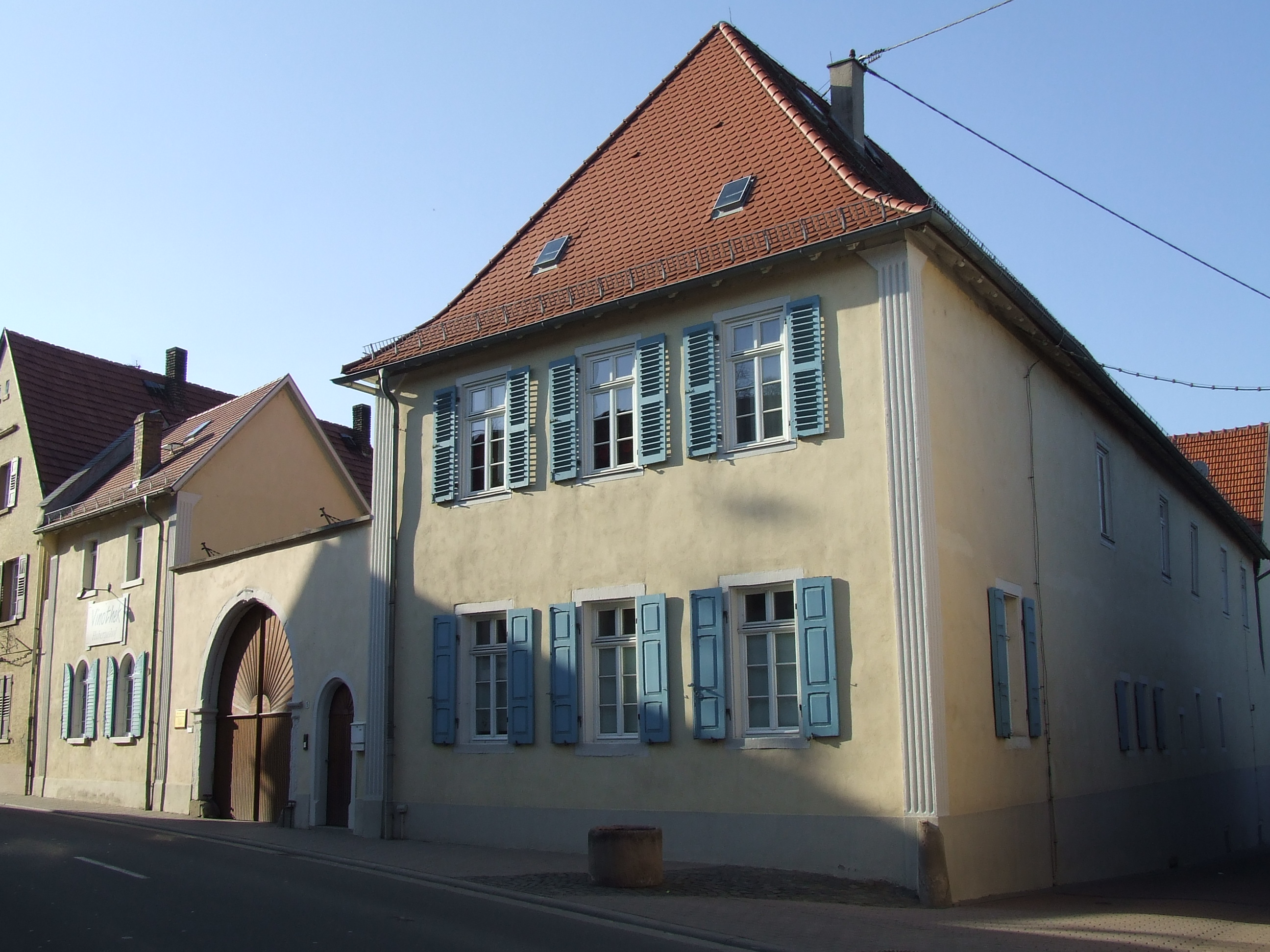
... of Vereinigte Weingüter Krebs-Grode (“Krebs-Grode United Wineries”)

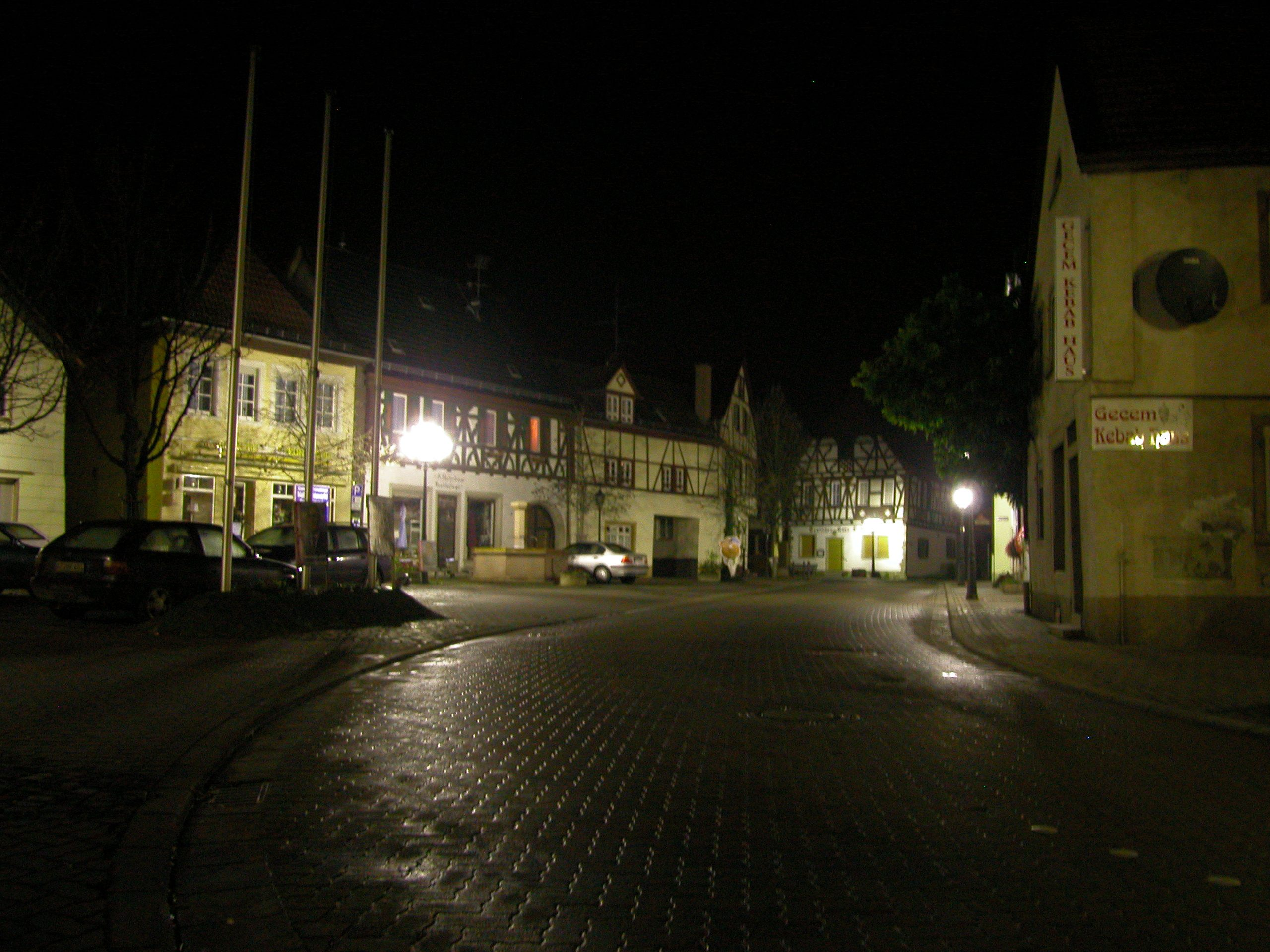
Obermarkt (“Upper Market”) by night

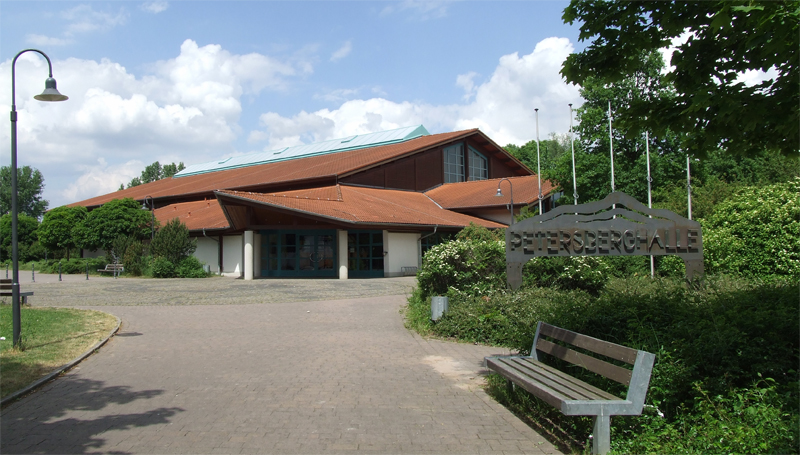
Petersberghalle

==== Gau-Köngernheim ====
In the Nachrichtliche Verzeichnis der Kulturdenkmäler Rheinland-Pfalz für den Landkreis Alzey-Worms, in which the state lists the district's cultural monuments, the following monuments can be found in Gau-Köngernheim:

- Evangelical church, a Baroque quarrystone one-room church, possibly 18th century, rooted in earlier times.
- Churchtower from 1828.
- In the churchyard, gravestones from the Gründerzeit, the latter half of the 19th century.
- Former Evangelical rectory, one-storey building with hipped Mansard roof from 1770.

=== Natural monuments ===
In the vineyards on the Lieberg in Gau-Odernheim can be found the greatest assemblage of wild tulips north of the Alps. For blossoming time in late April, the local conservation group stages the Wildtulpenfest (“Wild Tulip Festival”) each year on their Natur-Erlebnis-Platz (“Nature Adventure Square”).

== Economy and infrastructure ==
The municipality is mainly characterized by winegrowing and agriculture. Moreover, there are a car dealer in the community, four food markets and two butcher shops. One of these butcher shops was cited in 2004 by the magazine Der Feinschmecker as “2004’s best butcher”. In 2006, the Fleischwurst made at the very same butcher shop was chosen by the Zentralgenossenschaft des Deutschen Fleischergewerbes (“Central Coöperative of the German Butcher’s Trade”) as one of the four best in all Germany.

Also resident in Gau-Odernheim is the three-time winner of the Rhineland-Palatinate state government's multimedia contest in 2001, 2002 and 2005/2006 for, among other things, a school administration system for Alzey-Worms district schools and a canteen supervision programme for all-day schools.

=== Transport ===
For a place of its size, the transport links to Gau-Odernheim can be described as very good. The Autobahn A 63 can be reached after a 4.5 km drive to the Biebelnheim interchange, and also the Alzey interchange on the A 61 is only 6 km from Gau-Odernheim. The A 63 links Gau-Odernheim with Mainz and Kaiserslautern. Ludwigshafen and the Rhine-Neckar area can be reached over the A 61. Towards the north, the A 61 is a link to Koblenz, Mönchengladbach and the Netherlands.

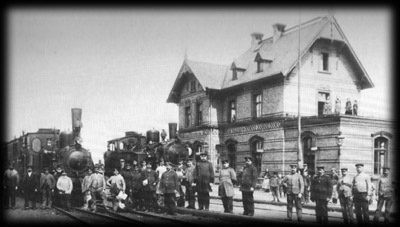
The Amiche railway line in Gau-Odernheim in 1904

On the other hand, Gau-Odernheim no longer has any railway link, but all buses that run from Mainz or Worms to Alzey stop in Gau-Odernheim, that is to say, the bus links can be called acceptable. Over a former stretch of railway track in Gau-Odernheim's municipal area in 2005, a local road bypass was built. The four roundabouts thereby created have led to Gau-Odernheim now sometimes being called jokingly Gau-Kreiselheim, Kreisel being one word in German for “roundabout”.

=== Education ===
- Grundschule Gau-Odernheim (primary school)
- Realschule am Alten Schloss (formerly: Grund- und Hauptschule Gau-Odernheim)

== Famous people ==
=== Sons and daughters of the town ===
- Heinrich Ritter, first NSDAP mayor in the People's State of Hesse, 1929, thereafter, among other things, the Chief Mayor of Mainz from 1942 to 1945.
- Jürgen Stark (b. 31 May 1948), vice-president of Deutsche Bundesbank
- Ernst Walter Görisch (b. 1949), Landrat of Alzey-Worms district from 2004 to 2019
- Oliver Drexler, repeat combat sport world champion
- Annette Koch, Rhenish-Hessian Wine Princess 1985/1986
- Alexandra Becker geborene Kneib, Rhenish-Hessian Wine Princess 1999/2000
- Eva Büsser, Rhenish-Hessian Wine Princess 2001/2002
- Kathrin Paukner, Rhenish-Hessian Wine Princess 2006/2007

=== Famous people associated with the municipality ===
- Jobst II Reuber (1542–1607) owner of the Odernheim estate, jurist and the Electorate of the Palatinate chancellor
- Franziska Gottwald

== Other ==
In the local dialect, Gau-Odernheim is called Orem, with a long O and unstressed E (German pronunciation: [ˈoːʁəm]).
