= Gabsheim =

- Municipality
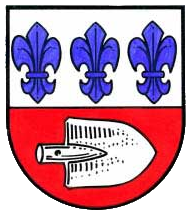
- Coat of arms

- Location of Gabsheim within Alzey-Worms district
- Interactive map of Gabsheim
- Location within Germany Location within Rhineland-Palatinate
- Coordinates: 49°49′40″N 8°10′34″E
- Country: Germany
- State: Rhineland-Palatinate
- District: Alzey-Worms
- Municipal assoc.: Wörrstadt

Government
  - Mayor (2019–24): Heribert Müller (CDU)

Area
  - Total: 8.10 km^{2} (3.13 sq mi)
- Elevation: 172 m (564 ft)

Population (2025-12-31)
  - Total: 717
  - Density: 88.5/km^{2} (229/sq mi)
- Time zone: UTC+01:00 (CET)
  - Summer (DST): UTC+02:00 (CEST)
- Postal codes: 55288
- Dialling codes: 06732
- Vehicle registration: AZ
- Website: www.gabsheim.de

Gabsheim is an Ortsgemeinde – a municipality belonging to a Verbandsgemeinde, a kind of collective municipality – in the Alzey-Worms district in Rhineland-Palatinate, Germany. It belongs to the Verbandsgemeinde of Wörrstadt, whose seat is in the like-named municipality.

== Geography ==
=== Location ===
The municipality lies in Rhenish Hesse, in Germany's biggest wine region. Indeed, Gabsheim is Rhenish Hesse's geographical centre. The nearest towns are Wörrstadt, roughly 5 km to the west, and the district seat, Alzey, roughly 15 km to the southwest. The state capital, Mainz, 30 km away, is easily reached over the Autobahn A 63.

=== Neighbouring municipalities ===
Gabsheim's neighbours are Bechtolsheim, Biebelnheim, Schornsheim, Undenheim and Wörrstadt.

== History ==
In the Middle Ages, Gabsheim was called Geispisheim (Geispitzheim); among many other spellings found in documents are also Geispodisheim (Geisbodesheim) (1250) and Gespesheim (1484). All forms, however, go back etymologically to the placename Gäu-Spießheim. Over time, the pronunciation of Gespesheim shifted to Gabsheim. Since the village is overwhelmingly Catholic, it is also sometimes known in the local speech as Gottes Gahbsem (the first word meaning “God’s”).

The “fortified place in Geisbodesheim near the church” mentioned in 1250 gives clues to a permanent living place or perhaps a small castle, which would have been the von Geispitzheim noble family's ancestral seat. As vassals of the Feudal Lords of Bolanden, further becoming fiefholders of the Counts of Veldenz beginning in the 14th century, the Knights of Geispitzheim (also called the Knights of Geisbodesheim) were mentioned as the Burgmannen at Odernheim am Glan (1190), at the Moschellandsburg (castle) near Obermoschel (1377, 1421, 1431), at Burg Treuenfels (castle) near Altenbamberg (1392), at Armsheim (14th century) and in neighbouring Bechtolsheim (until the early 16th century). The inscriptions from nine preserved gravestones from the 14th and 15th centuries clearly document that the Knights of Geispolzheim had their family burial ground near Saint Alban's Church, not far from their Gabsheim ancestral seat.

Noteworthy, besides those things bearing witness to the Gothic epoch, is the Baroque stone statue of Saint Alban.

== Politics ==
=== Municipal council ===
The council is made up of 12 council members, who were elected at the municipal election held on 7 June 2009, and the honorary mayor as chairman.

The municipal election held on 7 June 2009 yielded the following results:

	SPD	CDU	FWG	Total
2009	1	8	3	12 seats
2004	1	7	4	12 seats

=== Mayor ===
Heribert Müller (CDU) was elected mayor in May 2019. He succeeded Christian Geier (CDU), who was in office since 2014.

=== Coat of arms ===
The German blazon reads: Von Silber und Rot geteilt, oben drei blaue Lilien nebeneinander, unten ein liegendes silbernes Spatenblatt.

In English heraldic language, the municipality's arms might be described thus: Per fess argent three fleurs-de-lis in fess azure and gules a spade blade fesswise sinister of the first.

Gabsheim's arms as displayed and described herein go back to a court seal that was being used as early as 1507. While the spade blade is believed to have been a municipal symbol, the lilies refer to the Chamberlains of Dalberg, who were the lords until the late 18th century. The field tinctures argent and gules (silver and red) are an historical link to the former Archbishopric of Mainz, to which – like all Rhenish-Hessian places – Gabsheim also belonged.

== Culture and sightseeing ==
=== Buildings ===
The Catholic parish church in Gabsheim is among Rhenish Hesse’s oldest and biggest churches and given its commanding location above the village it is a prominent landmark for the whole area. The early mediaeval church was acknowledged in 1164 by Pope Lucius III as a holding of St. Alban's Abbey, Mainz. Even today, the church is still consecrated to Saint Alban of Mainz.

The forerunner building, mentioned in 1164, gave way towards the late 15th century to a newer, bigger building in the Gothic style. The new church’s nave and tower must have been built at roughly the same time as the church in Bechtolsheim for both churches bear the same mason’s hallmark, “-L”. In Gabsheim, this can be seen chiselled on both the bell tower's doorframe and on the church portal (as confirmed by an entry in the Speyer state archive, the church in Bechtolsheim was built between 1482 and 1487). Historically and stylistically, the church would seem to be the work of a member of the “Meisenheim School”, but whether the designer actually was Philipp von Gmünd cannot be established. A new expansion of the Gabsheim parish church was dedicated in 1768. Nevertheless, the whole building, including the tower, retained its Gothic character. This is shown on the outside foremost by the mighty chancel with its buttresses. Inside, the chancel likewise forms the architectural highlight with its fine rib vaults adorned with coats of arms. From the Gothic era come many of the décor's important pictorial works, while on the church's outer walls, various gravestones of the noble families that held estates here, such as the Barons of Dalberg and the knightly family Bube von Geispitzheim or Fetzer von Geispitzheim can be seen.
