= Rufus of Metz =

Rufus of Metz was, according to some sources, bishop of Metz for 29 years. He has been made a Catholic saint with his feast day on November 7.

In the ninth century his relics were transferred to Gau-Odernheim in Rhenish Hesse, Diocese of Mainz.

In the view of the Catholic Encyclopedia of 1913, his history is legendary:

His name was inserted at a later date in an old manuscript of the "Martyrol. Hieronym." (ed. cit., 140).
