= Biebelnheim =

- Municipality
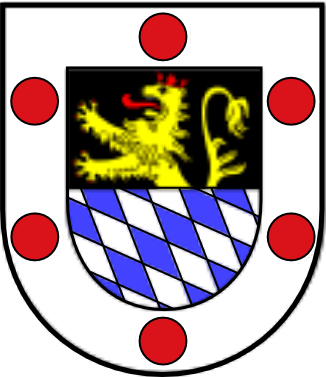
- Coat of arms

- Location of Biebelnheim within Alzey-Worms district
- Interactive map of Biebelnheim
- Location within Germany Location within Rhineland-Palatinate
- Coordinates: 49°47′48″N 8°10′14″E
- Country: Germany
- State: Rhineland-Palatinate
- District: Alzey-Worms
- Municipal assoc.: Alzey-Land

Government
  - Mayor (2019–24): Petra Bade

Area
  - Total: 6.20 km^{2} (2.39 sq mi)
- Elevation: 147 m (482 ft)

Population (2025-12-31)
  - Total: 668
  - Density: 108/km^{2} (279/sq mi)
- Time zone: UTC+01:00 (CET)
  - Summer (DST): UTC+02:00 (CEST)
- Postal codes: 55234
- Dialling codes: 06733
- Vehicle registration: AZ
- Website: https://www.gemeinde-biebelnheim.de/

Biebelnheim is an Ortsgemeinde – a municipality belonging to a Verbandsgemeinde, a kind of collective municipality – in the Alzey-Worms district in Rhineland-Palatinate, Germany.

== Geography ==
=== Location ===
The municipality lies in Rhenish Hesse. As a winegrowing centre, Biebelnheim lies in Germany's biggest winegrowing district, in the middle of Rhenish Hesse. It belongs to the Verbandsgemeinde of Alzey-Land, whose seat is in Alzey. The nearest town is Alzey (6 km), and the 30 km to the state capital, Mainz, is easily crossed on the Autobahn A 63.

=== Neighbouring municipalities ===
Biebelnheim's neighbours are Albig, Bechtolsheim, Gabsheim, Gau-Odernheim, and Spiesheim.

== History ==
The municipality, once known as Bibilinsheim, lying on a slope, is of a picturesque, rustic character. It is said that the robber and outlaw Schinderhannes (Johannes Bückler) once had a hideout here.

Sometime between 1382 and 1384, Electoral Palatinate acquired the Vogtei, as did the freeholders of Electoral Mainz in 1391. After its assignment to the sideline of Zweibrücken in 1410, the place once again found itself in the Palatinate's hands in 1470.

== Politics ==
=== Municipal council ===
The council is made up of 12 council members, with the honorary mayor as chairwoman.

The municipal election held on 7 June 2009 yielded the following results:

	SPD	Diel	Rick	Total
2009	4	4	4	12 seats

=== Mayor ===
- 1999–2014: Gabriele Holla (SPD)
- since 2014: Petra Bade (WiB)

=== Coat of arms ===
The municipality's arms might be described thus: Argent six roundels gules surrounding an inescutcheon party per fess sable a demi-lion rampant Or armed, langued and crowned of the second, and bendy lozengy argent and azure.

== Culture and sightseeing ==
=== Music ===
- Evangelischer Posaunenchor Biebelnheim (Evangelical trombone choir)
- Gesangverein Harmonie Biebelnheim (singing club)
- Beatles Museum “Little Cavern” (proprietor: Mathias Spang)

=== Buildings ===
- The Catholic church has a lovely Mother of God at the high altar, from about 1470 and showing Upper-Rhenish influence.
- Hofhaus (manor house) from the time when the family Bolanden were the landholders.

=== Sport ===
- TuS 1848 Biebelnheim e. V. (gymnastic and sport club)
- Tanz- und Jazzgymnastikverein Biebelnheim und Umgebung e. V. (dancing and jazz gymnastic club)
- Gymnastikverein 1991 Biebelnheim (gymnastic club)

== Economy and infrastructure ==
=== Transport ===
Transport links could, given Biebelnheim's size, be called very good. The Autobahn A 63 can practically be reached directly through the Biebelnheim interchange and also, through the nearby Autobahnkreuz Alzey (“Alzey Autobahn Cross”). The A 61 is only about 10 km away.

Within Biebelnheim itself, the road transport situation seems quite forbidding, as the municipality has no bypass at its disposal, and drivers from the neighbouring municipalities of Gau-Odernheim and Bechtolsheim must drive through Biebelnheim to reach the aforesaid Autobahnen. The growth in heavy-vehicle traffic through the municipality's narrow streets has given rise to a citizens’ initiative whose goal is to seek to have a bypass built, and also a cycle path to Gau-Odernheim. The expansion of the main road was supposed to happen in 2009.

=== Established businesses ===
In Biebelnheim can be found a few wineries as well as other agricultural businesses, a bakery, two tire dealers, an automotive dealership and a caravan dealership.

=== Public institutions ===
At the municipality's disposal are one kindergarten and the Biebelnheim volunteer fire brigade. Schoolchildren go to primary school in Bechtolsheim or to secondary school in Gau-Odernheim, Alzey or Wörrstadt.
